= William Alcock (footballer) =

Irish footballer (1860–1930)

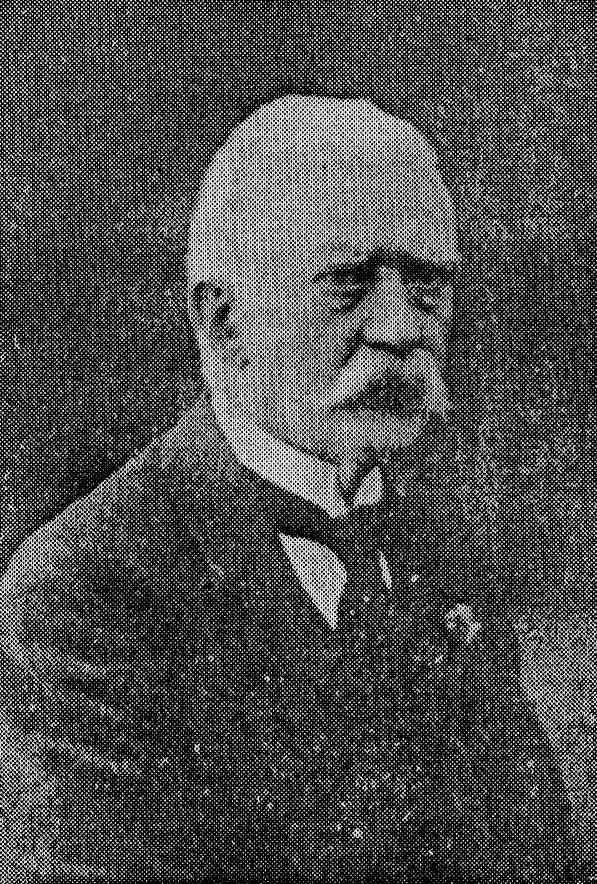
- William Alcock

Personal information
- Full name: William Jonathan Alcock
- Date of birth: 1860
- Place of birth: Cork, Ireland
- Date of death: 3 January 1930 (aged 69–70)
- Place of death: Huelva, Spain
- Position: Forward

Senior career*
Years	Team	Apps	(Gls)
1890–1904	Recreativo de Huelva	+3	(0)

Managerial career
- 1910–1924: Recreativo de Huelva
- * Club domestic league appearances and goals

William Jonathan Alcock (1860 – 3 January 1930) was an Irish footballer who was the first captain of Spanish club Recreativo de Huelva, leading his side in the first official football match in Spain in 1890, and later led the club to its first-ever piece of silverware in 1904.

== Early life ==
Born in 1860 in Cork, Alcock moved to Huelva in 1888, after being hired as head of the Groceries Department in the second warehouse of the Rio Tinto Company Limited. Whilst there, he opened a pub in the street currently known as Avenida de Italia.

== Playing career ==
Alcock was not one of the founding members of Recreativo de Huelva in December 1889, but he had a chalet near Hotel Colón, the place where it had been founded. He thus quickly became linked with the club, and just three months later, on 8 March 1890, he already was the team captain when the club faced Sevilla FC at the Hipódromo de Tablada (horse racing track), which ended in a 2–0 loss. This match is now considered to be the first official football match in Spain, which means that Alcock was the first official captain in Spanish football history, alongside Sevilla's Hugh MacColl. In most of the sources listing the line-ups of this match, Alcock and MacColl are the first to appear, leading many to wrongly assume that they were the goalkeepers. Alcock's team had never played together before, they had just returned from a four-hour train journey that same morning, and the match was refereed by Edward F. Johnston, the president of Sevilla FC.

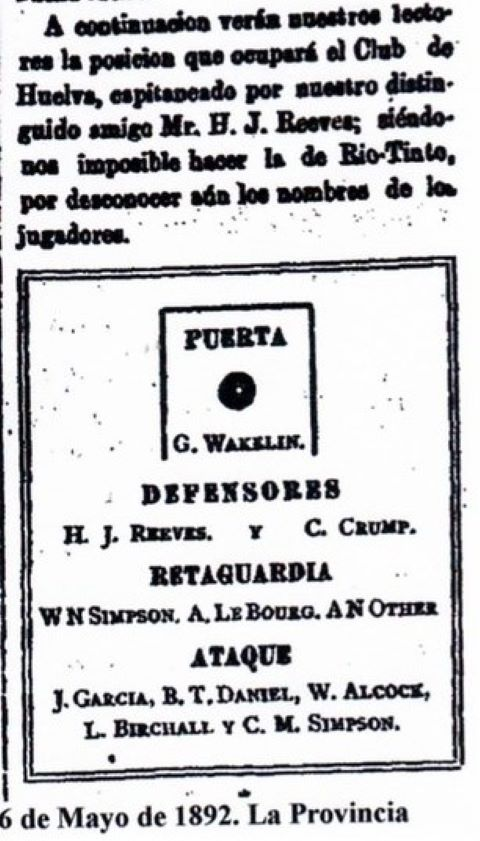
Alcock starting as a forward in a press release for a match between Recreativo and Riotinto on 6 May 1892.

Together with William Alexander Mackay, founder of the club, and Charles Wilson Adam, its first president, Alcock was one of the early promoters of the Recreativo. On 20 February 1892, he lined up for Huelva as a forward in a friendly match against Sevilla FC, which had been set to serve as a tie-breaker between the two teams, since their previous two encounters had ended in a draw; Huelva won 2–0. Three months later, on 6 May, he again started as a forward for Huelva, this time in a match against Rio Tinto FC, playing alongside the likes of George Wakelin, Benito Daniel, and James Reeves. In the press of Huelva, he was sometimes referred to as Guillermo Alcock.

On 20 November 1904, the 34-year-old Alcock captained Huelva to a victory over the British sailors of the Seamen's Institute, thus winning the so-called Copa Seamen's Institute, a silver cup that had been donated by Recreativo's vice-president José Muñoz Pérez, similar to how King Alfonso XIII had donated a trophy to the winners of the Copa del Rey, which had been founded only a year earlier. Despite some indications that the club had lifted the Copa de la Raza in 1893 and the Copa Heráldica in 1898, the first cup that Huelva won based on strict documentary evidence was the Copa Seamen's Institute, which was lifted by captain Alcock near the Anglican Chapel of the "Seamen's Institute"; this trophy is the oldest that Recreativo has in its museum.

== Managerial career ==
"Gentlemen: when you put on the blue and white jersey, you are not the ones under the shirt. Dressed like that, you are nothing but the Club. I do not need apologies, excuses, or explanations. Whoever wants to wear the colours of our Club tomorrow, and thus keep their word, should step forward."

— Alcock in his speech to the Recreativo squad on 30 March 1910.

After hanging up his boots, Alcock remained linked to the club as a director, a position that he held for over three decades, until September 1924, when he left the board, together with the club's long-time president Mackay. Thanks to his knowledge of English football, which at the time was much more advanced than the rest of Continental Europe, he began acting as the coach of the football team, and under his leadership, Recreativo maintained absolute hegemony in Andalusian football, winning all the competitions held until 1915, including three unofficial Andalusian Championship, which Recreativo itself organized, and the Copa Centenario de las Cortes de Cádiz in 1912.

In March 1910, Recreativo was invented to participate in the first football tournament held in Seville, but even though Alcock spent the next three weeks warning and preparing all of his players, he found out on the eve of the match that several members of the first team were unhappy with the trip and refused to go, which caused the others to be reluctant to travel, so Alcock brought them together in the club's headquarters, a wooden pavilion in the Campo del Velódromo, and gave them an emotional speech which has gone down in the history of Recreativo as a plea for loving the club's colors. Little by little, the players rose to their feet until seven of them stood up, and the team was then completed by four brave boys from the province, who were recruited at the last minute, and who made their debut for the first team against Seville, helping their side to a 2–0 victory, thus winning the Seville City Council Cup.

== Later life ==
Alcock served as the American Consular Agent in Huelva for 20 years, from 1900 to 1920. He headed the American vice-consulate of Huelva during the First World War. His services were terminated upon arrival of Consul Remillard in 1920. He was severely wounded by a madman in August 1913.

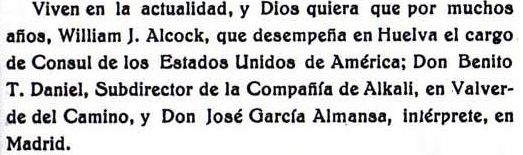
Reference to Alcock and Daniel in González Pérez's book.

In 1930, José González Pérez published a book titled Historia del football en Huelva y su provincia ("History of football in Huelva and its province"), whose value comes from the crucial collaboration and insightful testimonial contributions of Alcock and Benito Daniel, two former Huelva players who were still alive in 1929, when the book was being made.

== Death ==
Alcock died in London on 3 January 1930, at the age of 68. The Huelva press stated that his death was unexpected because, despite his advanced age, he still had a strong and vigorous complexion. He had two daughters Blanquita and Nina, both born in Huelva.

== Legacy ==
In December 2014, the American sports media ESPN compared Huelva's first-ever line-up, including Alcock, to the starting line-up of the Spanish football team in the final of the 2010 FIFA World Cup.
