= Copa Seamen's Institute =

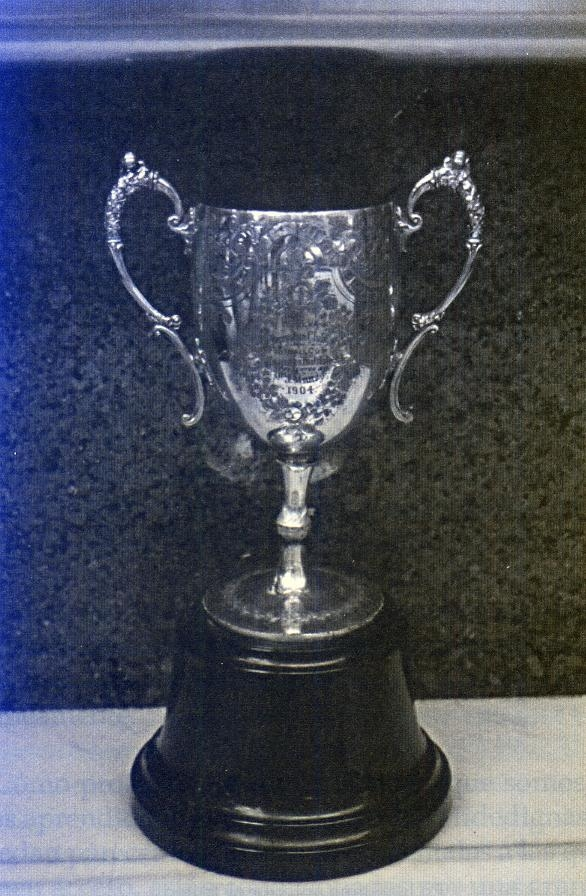
- The 1904 trophy exhibited in the Recreativo de Huelva Museum
- Organiser(s): Recreativo de Huelva
- Founded: 1904
- Abolished: 1915
- Region: Spain
- Last champions: Recreativo de Huelva (1911)

The Copa Seamen's Institute was a friendly football cup match contested by Recreativo de Huelva and the British sailors of the Seamen's Institute, hence the trophy's name, although it sometimes also called Copa Muñoz, in honor of the donator of the trophy, José Muñoz Pérez, the vice-president of Recreativo de Huelva, who organized and hosted the cup's first edition in 1904.

The Copa Seamen's Institute was not a title decided by a single match, as it was intended to be continually held by the winner of the previous edition, although the team who achieved three consecutive victories would ultimately become the winner, a typically British tradition. The cup was thus held on several occasions from 1904 until 1911 (around 40 in total), when Recreativo became its definitive owner upon achieving its third consecutive victory over the Seamen's Institute; it is the oldest football trophy held by Recreativo de Huelva.

== Seamen's Institute ==
The Seamen's Institute was an institution promoted by the British in the Spanish port cities who had a lot of influx from British sailors, such as Vigo, Andalusia, Huelva, Seville, and Bilbao. The board of directors of these institutes was usually constituted of commercial agents and management staff of British mining and shipping companies operating in Huelva, and its main priority was providing entertainment for these crew members and sailors, who spent a lot of time away from their homeland and their immediate families, as a means to prevent them from committing misdeeds, such as hooliganism, excessive alcohol consumption, and nightlife.

The construction of a Seamen's Institute building in Huelva began in August 1889, at the initiative of the Rio Tinto Company Limited (RTCL), who wanted to build a club not only for the sailors, but also for its employees who worked on the mines, and who spent a lot of time in harsh working conditions. This building, located on the Avenida de Italia and Calle Duque de la Victoria, was inaugurated on 16 February 1890, and it had a billiard room, a reading room, a library, a school with a paid teacher, and even an Anglican chapel with a Protestant pastor.

Its first board of directors include several figures who had been involved in the foundation of Recreativo de Huelva in December 1889, such as Charles Wilson Adam, William Alexander Mackay, Alfred John Gough, Gavin Speirs, William Bice, and Luis Birchall. Therefore, the relationship between both entities was quite close; for instance, between 1893 and late 1895, Recreativo was dedicated almost exclusively to organizing sports activities and providing entertainment for the crews of those ships arriving from England. However, the huge financial effort made by Recreativo to build the Campo del Velódromo in 1892, plus organizing the many sporting events of the IV Centenary of the Discovery of America, had taken its toll, which meant that the Seamen's Institute now had to acquire its own sports equipment since Recreativo could no longer keep providing it due to its spending cuts. As a result, in March 1896, Mackay proposed that Recreativo "be managed by the said maritime entity", and thus the club was incorporated into the Seamen's Institute in 1897, with Mackay and Birchall establishing the club's sports committee within the Institute in January 1897.

During the following years, Recreativo, now under the auspices of the Seamen's Institute, kept organizing sports activities at the Velodrome, mainly football, cricket, and tennis, but only among its members, as the club did not have any opponents close by at the time. It was not until after the success of the 1902 Copa de la Coronación that Recreativo began to consider starting a serious group, with even the local press encouraging the club to abandon its "exclusivism" in order to form a football team that could compete in the inaugural edition of the Copa del Rey, which was exactly what Recreativo ended up doing. In January 1903, they informed the City Council that their collaboration with the Seamen's Institute was dissolved, thus abandoning its exclusive manner to open to Huelva society once again (just like in the early 1890s), with the club's new statutes for its new social life being finally approved on 15 May 1903. Mackay then requested a special permit from the RTCL to build new "Pavilions" at the Velodrome for the practice of cricket and football, which was inaugurated with a football match on 15 October 1904, either between Club Onubense and Club de Riotinto, or between Recreativo and Rio Tinto FC.

== Origins ==
In late 1903, José Muñoz Pérez, the vice-president of Recreativo de Huelva, proposed to create a tournament exclusively for football between the Recreativo members and the British sailors of the Seamen's Institute, an idea that was approved at the board meeting held on 9 December 1903. Muñoz decided to follow the footsteps of the Copa del Rey, which had been inaugurated earlier that year with a cup donated by Alfonso XIII, and ordered a cup made of silver in London, which has an inscription stating "Huelva Recreation Club. Football Cup. Seamen's Institute. Presented by Mr. Jose Muños. 1904". At the time, the local press referred to it as Copa José Muñoz, or simply as Copa de plata ("Silver Cup), but throughout the following decades it became known as Copa Seamen's.

== The matches ==
The first match, which took place at the Velodrome on 2 January 1904, was won by the British, and it continued to be contested, with many more matches in late 1904, as well as frequently in the following years, always against the crews of ships docking in the port. This was followed by another match on 30 April, which was postponed to 6 November 1894 to coincide with the inauguration of the new facilities at the Velodrome; the British won again 4–2. Unsatisfied, Recreativo competed for it again just two Sundays later, on 20 November, this time near the Anglican Chapel of the "Seamen's Institute", where they finally claimed victory. Despite some indications that Huelva had already won some cups in the 1890s, (Note: Huelva lifted a certain Copa de la Raza in 1893, after beating the English colony of Seville by 0–2, and then won the so-called Copa Heráldica in 1898, after beating a team from Seamen's Institute.) the Copa Seamen's remains the first cup that Huelva won based on strict documentary evidence, being lifted by captain William Alcock, who thus became the first one to do so.

Over time, Recreativo began demonstrating their superiority, winning more frequently and with increasingly large scores, and therefore, the cup inevitably became the definitive property of Huelva on 1 January 1911, when it achieved its third consecutive victory over the Seamen's (12–0). Even though Recreativo played some more matches against crews of British ships, the dispute over the cup was no longer mentioned, and their last recorded match took place on 7 March 1915, with Recreativo winning 4–0.

== Legacy ==
The Copa Seamen's Institute is the oldest football trophy held by Recreativo, which has it displayed in the stadium's showcases, where it stands as one of the most notable examples of the club's heritage. During its development as a BIC (World Heritage Site), Recreativo decided to start a process of cataloging and restoring its heritage, and therefore, in 2021, they tasked the prestigious Delgado López goldsmiths with not only carrying out the trophy's restoration, but also replicating its original cover based on surviving photographs of the original trophy, which was ultimately not necessary as the cup's cover, lost for over 60 years, was recovered thanks to an anonymous donation.
