= Benito Daniel =

Scottish footballer

Personal information
- Place of birth: Scotland
- Date of death: 27 January 1930
- Position: Forward

Senior career*
Years	Team	Apps	(Gls)
1890–1892	Recreativo de Huelva	+3	(0)
- * Club domestic league appearances and goals

Benito Daniel was a Scottish footballer who played as a forward for Recreativo de Huelva in the first official football match in Spain in 1890.

== Playing career ==
Daniel was on the first list of club members of Recreativo de Huelva on 20 December 1889, and three months later, on 8 March 1890, Daniel went down in history as one of the eleven footballers who started for Huelva in the first official football match in Spain, a friendly against Sevilla FC at the Hipódromo de Tablada (horse racing track), which ended in a 2–0 loss. However, Daniel's team had never played together before, they had just completed a four-hour train journey in that same morning, and that the match was refereed by Edward F. Johnston, the president of Sevilla FC.

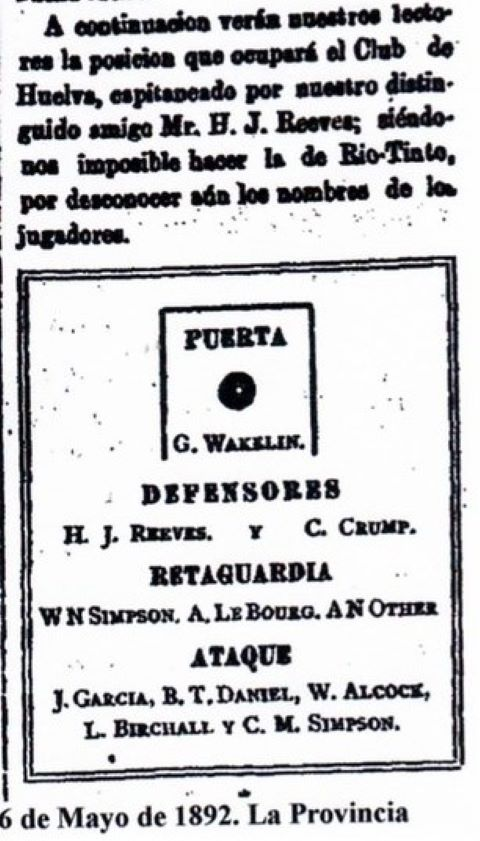
Daniel starting as a forward in a press release for a match between Recreativo and Riotinto on 6 May 1892.

On 20 February 1892, Daniel lined up for Huelva in another friendly match against Sevilla, which had been set up as a tie-breaker between the two teams, since their previous two encounters had ended in a draw; Huelva won 2–0. Three months later, on 6 May, he again started as a forward for Huelva, this time in a match against Rio Tinto FC, playing alongside the likes of fellow British George Wakelin, William Alcock, and James Reeves.

== Later life and death ==
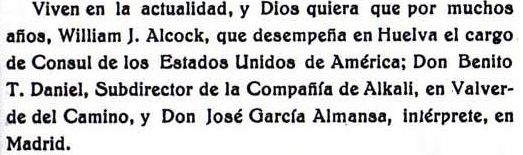
Reference to Alcock and Daniel in González Pérez's book.

In 1930, José González Pérez published a book titled Historia del football en Huelva y su provincia ("History of football in Huelva and its province"), whose value comes from the crucial collaboration and insightful testimonial contributions of Daniel and Alcock, two former Huelva players who were still alive in 1929, when the book was being made. At the time, Daniel lived in the town of Valverde del Camino, whose population had been introduced to football by him, who then founded Valverde FC and Deportiva, being its first president. He was also the head of accounting for the Alkali and Buitrón Companies, so when the director of the former, Carlos Kaesmacher, died in October 1929, Daniel was present in the subsequent tribute paid to him.

Daniel died too just a few months later, on 27 January 1930, shortly after giving his testimony to González Pérez.

== Legacy ==
In December 2014, the American sports media ESPN compared Huelva's first-ever line-up, including Daniel, to the starting line-up of the Spanish football team in the final of the 2010 FIFA World Cup.
