= John Sutherland Mackay =

Scottish medic and sportsperson

- Born: 26 March 1848; Latheron, Caithness, Scotland
- Died: 31 March 1924 (aged 76); Newington, Edinburgh, Scotland
- Citizenship: Scottish
- Occupations: Medic; Sportsperson
- Known for: First president of Rio Tinto FC

1st president of Rio Tinto FC
- In office 1878 – Mid-1880s
- Succeeded by: William Bice

John Sutherland Mackay (26 March 1848 – 31 March 1924) was a Scottish medical doctor who worked for Rio Tinto and presided over Rio Tinto FC, one of the first football teams formed in Spain.

== Early life and education ==
John Sutherland Mackay was born in Latheron, Caithness, on 26 March 1848, as the son of Wilhelmina Sutherland and Reverend John Mackay, an ordained minister in the Free Church of Scotland and Anglican priest.

After attending the old Grammar School in Aberdeen, Mackay studied medicine in Edinburgh, and then graduated from the University of St Andrews in Fife.

== Professional career ==
In 1877–78, Mackay moved to Huelva after he was hired as the new chief medical officer of the Rio Tinto Company Limited (RTCL), whose employees had health issues due to their work at the copper mines of Rio Tinto. Shortly after his arrival, Mackay promoted the creation of the Rio Tinto English Club (known in Huelva as Club Inglés Bella Vista), a club where the British colony of Huelva, mainly the mine workers of Rio Tinto, played their favorite sports, such as cricket, rugby, and football, and he was then elected as the club's first president in 1878. This club eventually gave birth to a football team, the so-called Rio Tinto FC, and indeed, there are reports of football games between Rio Tinto and Huelva as early as 1882, but these teams were never officially established, so there is no legal record of their existence.

The growing development of the mine coupled with the company's increasing staff made it clear that the RTCL needed a second company doctor, and luckily, Mackay had a newly qualified younger brother, the 23-year-old William Alexander Mackay, who arrived in Huelva in 1883, who had also graduated from the Edinburgh University. Inspired by Rio Tinto FC, his younger brother went on to create the Sociedad de Juego de Pelota (Spanish: Ball Game Society), which organized football and cricket games, usually between his compatriots living in Riotinto and crews of the British ships who docked in the port of Huelva, ranging from sailors to captains through officers. After a few years of consolidating these sports practices, he co-founded Recreativo de Huelva and on 18 December 1889, a sports club originally intended to provide physical recreation for the Rio Tinto mineworkers to improve their health.

As for John, he was awarded the Order of Isabella the Catholic for his medical services in Spain, and was later employed as a medical officer in Fife.

== Death ==
Mackay died as an unmarried man in Newington, Edinburgh, on 31 March 1924, at the age of 76.
