= James Reeves (footballer) =

English footballer (1869–1937)

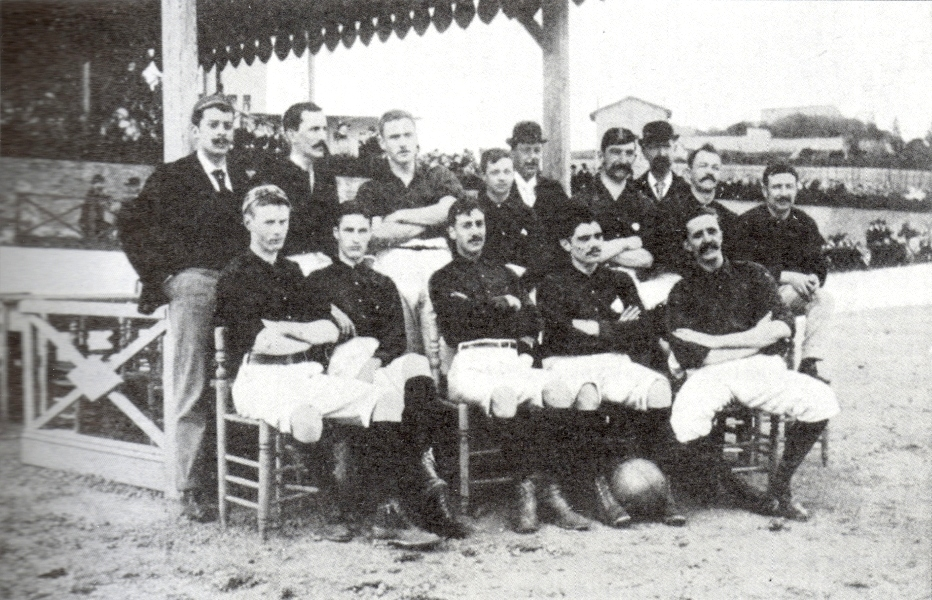
- Reeves (sitting second to the right, with the ball on his feet) in 1895

Personal information
- Full name: Herbert James Reeves
- Date of birth: c. May 1869
- Place of birth: Hackney, Middlesex, England
- Date of death: 4 June 1937 (aged 68)
- Place of death: England
- Position(s): Forward

Senior career*
Years	Team	Apps	(Gls)
1892	Recreativo de Huelva	+2	(+0)
1892–1894	Barcelona Football Club	+3	(+1)
1895	Sociedad de Foot-Ball de Barcelona	2	(+3)
- *Club domestic league appearances and goals

Herbert James Reeves (1869 – 4 June 1937), also known as James Reeves or Captain Reeves, was an English football pioneer who is regarded as one of the most important figures in the amateur beginnings of football in Catalonia, being noted for his prominent role in promoting football in the city and as the undisputed leader and fundamental head behind the foundations of some of the earliest Catalan clubs in existence such as British Club de Barcelona and Sociedad de Foot-Ball de Barcelona, serving both teams as its captain. In addition to his leadership skills, he also stood out as a great striker, netting some of the first goals in the history of Catalan football.

== Early life and education ==
Herbert James Reeves was born in 1869 in Hackney, then a municipality in the county of Middlesex (now a district of Greater London). The exact date of birth is not known, but he was registered in the civil registry between April and June of that year. Reeves was born to a wealthy family, being the second of eight children of John Reeves (1838–1902), a sawyer, and Elizabeth Sowter (1848–1926).

Reeves studied engineering, and graduated as an artisan engineer. While in Middlesex, he developed a deep interest in football, already showing great leadership skills from a young age.

== Footballing career ==
=== Recreativo de Huelva ===
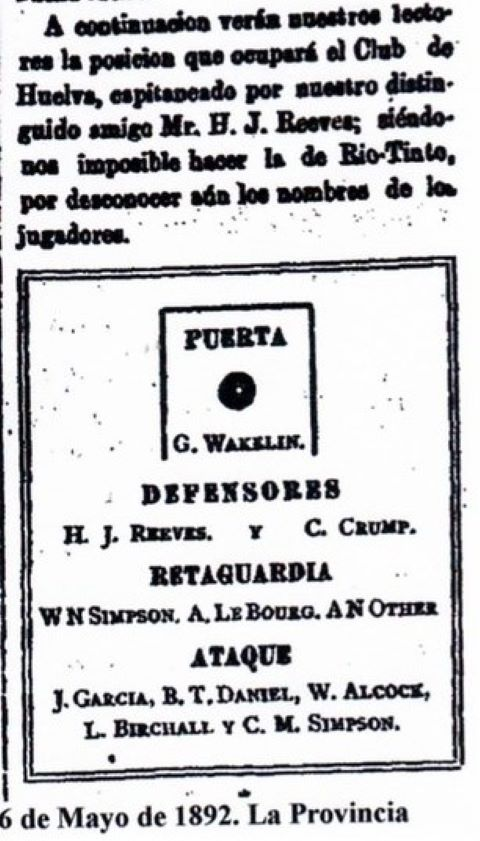
Reeves starting as a defender in a press release for a match between Recreativo and Riotinto on 6 May 1892.

At some point in late 1891, Reeves moved to Huelva after being hired by the local Waterworks Company, and while he was there, he began playing football in his free time with his friends and co-workers in order to feel more at home, and eventually, he joined the ranks of the only football club that existed in the region, Recreativo de Huelva, which had been founded just two years earlier, in December 1889, and which was then presided by a fellow Briton Charles Wilson Adam. On 20 February 1892, he lined up for Huelva as a defender in a friendly match against Sevilla FC, which had been set to serve as a tie-breaker between the two teams, since their previous two encounters had ended in a draw; Huelva won 2–0. Three months later, on 6 May, he again started as a defender for Huelva, this time in a match against Rio Tinto FC, playing alongside the likes of George Wakelin, William Alcock, and Luis Birchall. In the press of Huelva, he was sometimes referred to as D. Herberto J. Reeves.

In May 1892, Reeves was appointed to a committee tasked with the preparation of the "Program of Events" organized by Recreativo de Huelva in commemoration of the fourth Centenary of the Discovery of America by Christopher Columbus, which consisted of several sporting events that took place in the months of August, September, and October, held at the so-called Campo del Velódromo, which had been inaugurated by Recreativo on 20 August, and whose construction had already been confirmed as early as February 1892, around the time of Reeves' first known match for Huelva, so it is likely that he might have contributed to this project through his knowledge as an artisan engineer and of the water services of the city. The Velódromo thus became Recreativo's first official football field, but Reeves never got to try it out because, by the time of its inauguration in August, he had already left Huelva.

=== Moving to Barcelona ===
Despite some encouraging first steps in Huelva, Reeves had to move to Barcelona in the summer of 1892, due to having been hired by the newly-founded Barcelona Waterworks Company Ltd, remaining in the Catalan capital for as long as the company lasted (1892–1895).

At that time, football was a sport practically unknown in the city, with the Barcelona Cricket Club (one of the many branches of the British Club de Barcelona), founded by Britons a year earlier, being the only sign of football in Catalonia, as they played cricket in the summer and then football in the winter, which was common at the time. Unlike Recreativo, however, the Cricket Club was a strictly British entity, so instead of joining this team, Reeves, an enthusiastic and passionate lover of the game, aimed to create an organization that was not only exclusively dedicated to the practice of football, but also open to everyone, regardless of their origin.

=== Founding the Barcelona Football Club ===
As part of his "waterworks" duty, Reeves became a member of Club Regatas de Barcelona, a club of rowing and sailing, where he was the spokesman for the club's British members (or British Club Regatas). During his time there, he met and convinced some of the club's British members to play football, but also some French members and most notably, three Catalans, Figueras, Tuñí, and Alberto Serra, who thus became the first documented Catalans to practice football in Catalonia. They began to play football around the autumn of 1892 in Casa Antúnez, a field between the Hippodrome of Can Tunis and the civil arsenal, which was the same ground that the Cricket Club was using to play football, and thus, they began facing each other, preferably on holidays, since Sundays were not a non-working day until 1905.

The individual from the English colony, Reeves, was the soul of that Club and managed to impress some of his countrymen with his entrepreneurial spirit so that in a short time he achieved a respectable number of members.

— Joaquim Escardó of Los Deportes in 1906.

During their matches in the Spanish public holidays of 6 and 8 December, Reeves proposed to the cricketers the idea of creating a well-organized football club, and having impressed some of his countrymen with his passionate and entrepreneurial spirit, he convinced some of the Cricket Club members to join him, including some of its founders, such as Henry Wood, William MacAndrews, and the Morris (Jaime and Samuel), thus achieving a respectable number of partners in a short period of time. Apparently, this group of football pioneers led by Reeves was constituted as Barcelona Football Club, thus following the same structure of English club names.

=== 1892–93 season ===
Even though the British colony of Barcelona had a large presence in the city, finding 22 individuals (plus the referee) was not an easy task, given that the expatriates came to work and many of them had positions of responsibility. It was not until the end of 1892, after months of hard work, that Reeves finally managed to gather enough players to assemble two teams to start practicing football, although in the vast majority of matches, they did not complete the 11s per side. At last, on 25 December 1892, they were able to play the first known football match in the city (actually in the neighboring municipality of Sants). Very little is known about that Christmas Day in 1892, only that the venue was near the grounds of the Can Tunis hippodrome, and that Reeves was the captain of one of the teams.

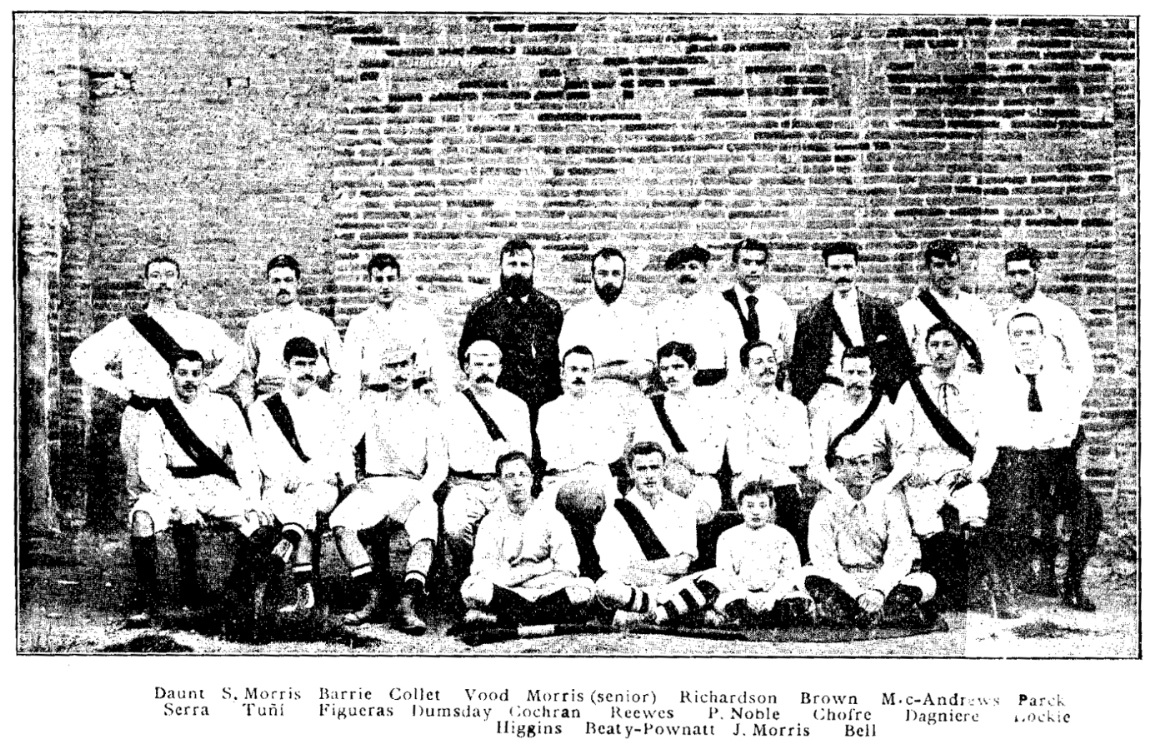
Reeves (middle row, fifth from the right) with the two sides of the British Club de Barcelona on 12 March 1893; this is the oldest documented image of a football team in Spain.

Reeves kept organizing football games between the members of the British Club de Barcelona, including the infamous match on 12 March 1893 between a blue team captained by George Cochran and a red one led by himself, and Reeves captained by example as he netted his side's only goal in a 2–1 loss, with both Blue goals coming from non-Britons (Figueras and Jorge Barrié), meaning that his club's inclusion of locals was paying off, albeit they scored against the 51-year-old Jaime Morris (Senior). The photograph of these two sides just before the match is widely regarded as the oldest photo of a football team in Spain. Moreover, this game was the catalyst for the first proper chronicle of the dispute of a football match, which appeared in the newspaper La Dinastia on 16 March 1893.

=== 1893–94 season ===
During the winter of 1893–94, he captained the so-called English colony from Barcelona in a series of matches against the Scottish colony from Sant Martí, which was captained by the Scot Willie Gold. They faced each other at least three times on 8 December 1893, 11 March, and 15 April 1894, however, due to the little statistical rigor that the newspapers had at that time, very little is known about those matches. Local historians claim that this was the first ever 'unofficial' rivalry in Spanish football.

=== 1894–95 season ===
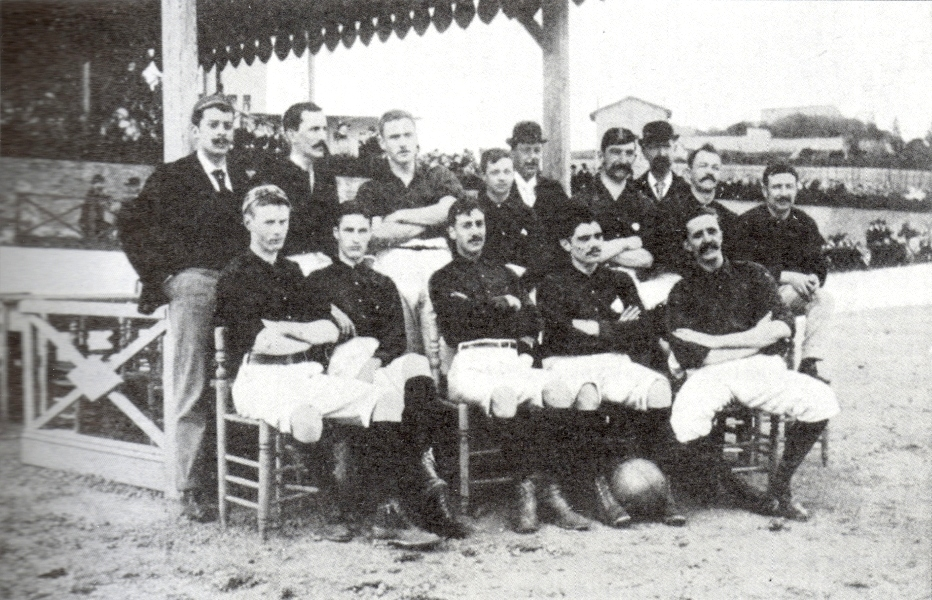
Reeves (seated, second from the right, with the ball on his feet) with the members of the Sociedad de Foot-Ball de Barcelona in 1895.

Between 1892 and 1894, Reeves and Cochran always acted as captains of the two sides into which the members of the club were divided every Sunday. The last example of this was on 8 December 1894, this time with Reeves being the captain of the Reds and Cochran of the Blues. In their next match, Cochran had already lost the captaincy, which was given to the 20-year-old John Beaty-Pownall. This was most likely the result of a growing conflict with Reeves, probably about the formalization process that the club was going through, which eventually caused the entity to split into two groups, one headed by Reeves, the so-called Sociedad de Foot-Ball de Barcelona ("Barcelona Football Society"), and the other by Cochran, Wood, and MacAndrews, which went on to form the Torelló Foot-ball Association.

With the change of name came also the change of field, leaving the Hippodrome of Can Tunis to settle at the Velódromo de la Bonanova, as Reeves wanted a place of easier access to the city center. Something that did not change, however, was the captain, as Reeves remained the undisputed leader of the entity, captaining one of the sides that disputed the first football match played in Bonanova on 27 January 1895, which was played by 16 players from the Barcelona Football Society divided into two teams (Blues vs Reds). On 2 February, he captained the Blue Team in a match against the Reds led by Beaty-Pownall, and once again he led by example, netting his side's only goal in a 4–1 loss, courtesy of Pownall and John Parsons (2).

Apart from the Blue v Red games, the Barcelona Football Society only played two matches in the 1894–95 season, both against a team from Torelló (Torelló Foot-ball Association), which was the very first time that teams from two different cities played against each other in Catalonia, and Reeves was the captain in both games. With a capacity of 3,000, Bonanova was seen completely full on both occasions, and he was the first who gave them something to cheer as he netted the opening goal in an 8–3 local win on 24 March 1895. In the return fixture in Torelló, he captained his side in a 5–3 loss, courtesy of a hat-trick from Cochran.

=== 1895–96 season ===
Reeves played several friendly matches at Can Tunis and a few others at Bonanova between 1892 and 1895, where he stood out as a great goal scorer, however, due to the little statistical rigor that the newspapers had at that time, the exact number of goals he netted is unknown. Despite some encouraging first steps, the club was never officially established as Reeves just wanted to play football for fun and was not worried about the official status and legal questions involved in a sport that was still in its infancy in Spain.

Coinciding with the closure of the Barcelona Waterworks Company Ltd, Reeves returned to the United Kingdom in November 1895, leaving the club orphaned in its management, with the local press of the time stating that his departure "will deprive the many young football fans of one of the strong champions that the Barcelona party ever had". Following his departure, it was the Catalans who took the reins of the team, but without him, the entity soon declined, collapsed and around 1896 this society, which was never officially established, seems to disappear. For this reason, no Briton played football in Spain (that we know of) in 1897 and 1898. They only began to play again in 1899, with the emergence of Team Anglès.

== Later and personal life ==
In 1906, Reeves joined "A. C. Potter & CO", a firm of artesian well engineers, general water works contractors, and manufacturers of pumping machinery, which was based in Southwark, Central London, and in doing so, he formed a business partnership with Arthur Crawley Potter and Robert William Bennett, although the latter left the company in August 1907; they had 150 employees in 1914.

In 1908, Reeves married Katherine Margaret Beaty-Pownall (1870–1942), widow of Henry Wood and sister of John Beaty-Pownall. Katherine already had two children from her previous marriage to Wood, and in 1910 they had a child of their own, John Pownall Reeves. At the time of the 1911 United Kingdom census, he was living at 1 Grotes Buildings, Blackheath, London with his wife Katherine and his one-year-old son.

Reeves served in the Royal Army Service Corps during the First World War, first as a second lieutenant, and later as a captain.

In June 1930, the partnership between Reeves and Potter was dissolved, which meant the end of "A. C. Potter & CO", then based at Dysart Road, Grantham, in the county of Lincoln.

== Death ==
Reeves died on 4 June 1937 at the age of 68.
