= Riotinto mining strike of 1920 =

Miners' strike in 1920

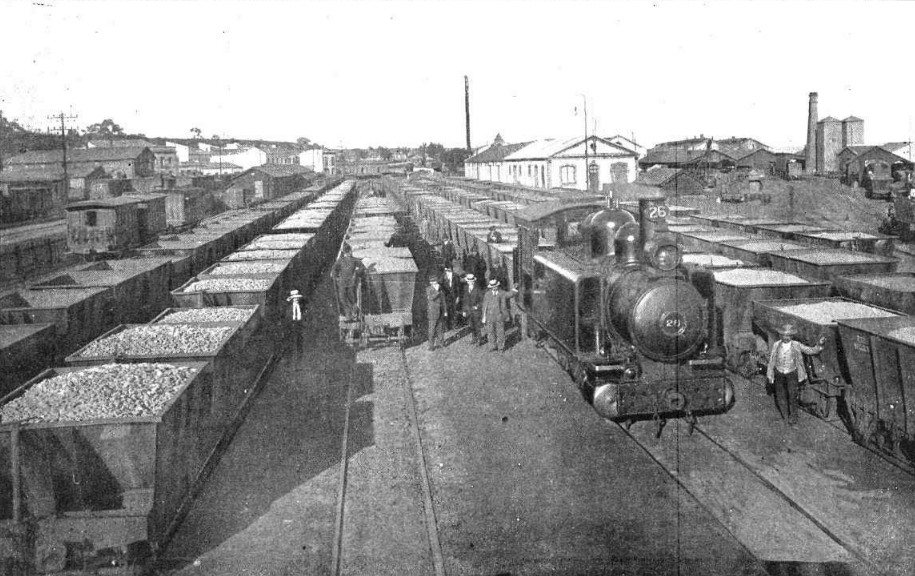
Miners' trains at Huelva station during the strike.

The Riotinto mining strike of 1920 was a general strike that took place in the Riotinto-Nerva mining basin (Huelva) during 1920. The conflict went through several phases of varying intensity and lasted nine months, during which about 11,000 workers took part in the strike movement. The strike, which was extraordinarily tough and had an important media echo in the rest of the country, ultimately failed in its objectives.

== Economic and social context ==
In 1873, the Riotinto mines were acquired by the Rio Tinto Company Limited (RTC), giving rise to an important mining and industrial boom in the area. This resulted in the arrival of many immigrants to the area to meet the labor needs that had arisen, in a context of overcrowding in unhealthy working villages and extraordinarily harsh working conditions. All of this constituted a breeding ground for an increase in union membership among workers from the beginning of the 20th century, with a predominance of the CNT and the UGT. The first strike organized in the basin took place in 1888 (“the year of the shots”), and ended up with the police shooting strikers and protestors. Another strike in 1913 would reach greater heights and last longer - about eight months intermittently.

== Development of the strike ==
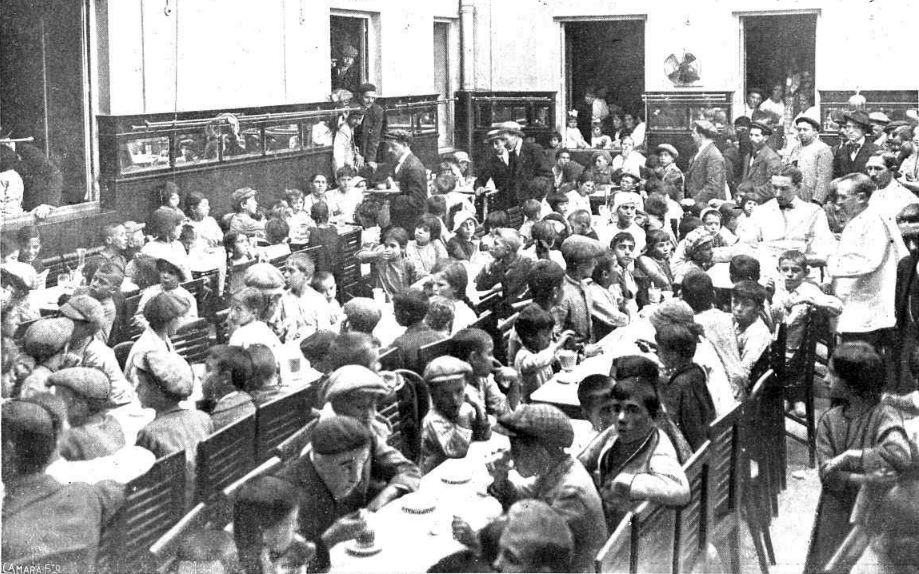
Children from Riotinto, taken in by working-class families from Madrid, having breakfast at the Casa del Pueblo.

As in other areas, the RTC workers in the Riotinto basin had been demanding wage increases and a reduction in the cost of living since 1918, to alleviate the crisis that the country was experiencing as a result of the effects of World War I. The strike began in early 1920 with work stopping in various departments of RTC in the Riotinto area, such as the Copper Smelter. Initially, these actions were not coordinated and occurred intermittently over time. Later, the Riotinto and Huelva station railroad workers also went on strike, paralyzing the activity of the railway line; the authorities ended up sending military troops to the area to control the situation, and a railroad operating committee was formed. At its peak, around 11,000 workers participated in the strike.

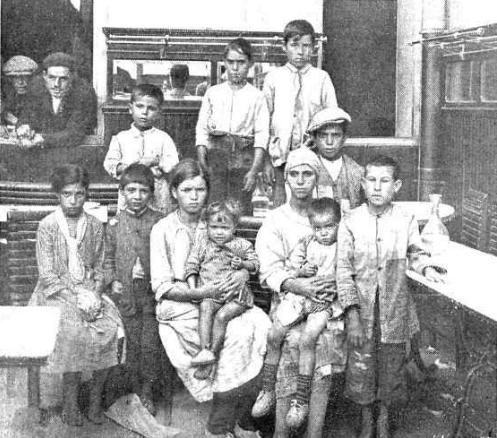
A group of miners' children, victims of hunger and poverty.

Although the RTC initially showed a certain conciliatory attitude, it categorically refused to accept all the workers' demands. Over time, moreover, it toughened its stance towards the strike. This was reflected in the attitude of the company's general manager, Walter Browning, who was the target of strong attacks from the left-wing press and the trade union sectors. Historian José J. de Paz Sánchez has pointed to the possibility that Browning conspired with the company to incite the strike since the RTC was looking for a reduction in personnel in order to reduce costs. The administration and the government opted not to intervene directly as a mediator between the two parties, despite criticism of this attitude.

By August, the situation of the workers and their families worsened greatly, and they had to improvise canteens and food distributions to alleviate the hunger that was already affecting the strikers. Many parents opted to send their children out of the mining basin, with host families, in order to remedy the lack of food. An expedition of 300 children was organized to Peñarroya, an important mining center, while another expedition of 200 children was sent to Madrid. In total, some 3,000 children from Riotinto would end up being relocated. At the same time, in the rest of the country, a current of sympathy for the strikers arose. Collections were made and public subscriptions were opened in other parts of Spain to send economic funds to alleviate the situation of the miners. For its part, the Town Council of Riotinto mines was forced to distribute 1,000 rations of food daily to try to alleviate the situation in the municipality. The situation would become so bad that, by November 1920, around 2,000 workers had abandoned the strike due to hunger.

Now weakened, the strike came to an end in January 1921.

== Consequences ==
The strike, which suffered from a serious lack of coordination among its organizers, was eventually won by the RTC. One of the consequences of this was that the union structure in the mining basin was practically dismantled after the reprisals carried out by the company, which dismissed more than 2,500 workers. Many of them ended up emigrating abroad due to the lack of job prospects. The labor situation in the area was “pacified” for at least a decade, until the time of the Second Republic. However, according to a report made by a company envoy to Riotinto, William Rhys, some corrections were made to the problems that had been found.
