= Campo del Velódromo =

Sports venue in Huelva (1892–1957)

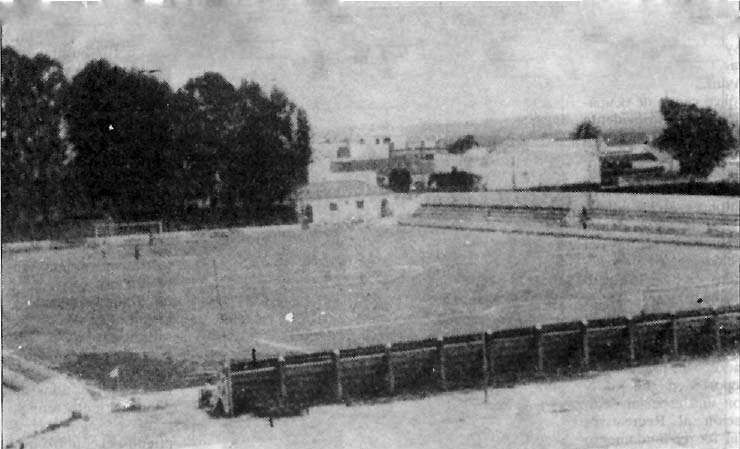
- Estadio del Velódromo in 1895
- Location: Huelva, Andalusia, Spain

Construction
- Opened: 14 August 1892
- Demolished: 1957

Tenant
- Recreativo de Huelva (1892–1957)

The Campo del Velódromo, also known as Estadio del Velódromo, was a sports venue in the city of Huelva, Spain, that existed between 1892 and 1957. It was the first sports facility designed for the practice of football in Spain and it served as the very first playing field of Recreativo de Huelva. It had a track for bicycle races around the playing field, hence its name.

== History ==
=== Origins ===
In 1891, Recreativo de Huelva, which had been founded just a few years earlier in 1889, committed to collaborate with the commemorative festivities in Huelva of the fourth Centenary of the Discovery of America by Christopher Columbus, doing so by organizing an extensive program of sports events during the summer of 1892. However, the club quickly understood that they needed a sports facility in order to properly host said sporting events, and also to provide greater comfort to the expected public, taking as a model those that already existed across the English Channel. Thus, on 9 December 1891, Recreativo held a board meeting at its headquarters in the Hotel Colón where it made the pioneering decision of building Spain's first-ever sports facility designed for the practice of football, as well as other sports practiced within its members, such as cricket and cycling.

For this end, José Muñoz Pérez, the club's secretary, sent an application to the Huelva City Council, requesting the land in Vega Larga, near the Gas Factory owned by Charles Wilson Adam, the club's president, which was the spot where Recreativo had been playing until then, thanks to the initiative of William Alexander Mackay. The permission to carry out works on it was granted on 21 December, and was communicated in writing to the club on 22 December.

However, a controversy arose over the ownership of that area, so Recreativo's board, not wanting to prolong the matter, had to find an alternative location, and likewise, in late January 1892, Recreativo acquired some land between the train tracks and the Alameda Sundheim, practically in front of the Hotel Colón, which would serve as the epicentre of the upcoming IV Centenary commemorations; this land was ceded free of charge and exclusively to Recreativo by the Rio Tinto Company Limited (RTCL). The Velodrome was thus built there during the first half of 1892, under the supervision of a subcommittee formed by Adam and Mackay. In February 1892, Muñoz Pérez, who was also a correspondent in Huelva for the Madrid weekly El Sport, stated "that the construction of a Velodrome by the Recreational Club, and probably also a Hippodrome, is already a fact. The works of the former will begin at the beginning of April, on some magnificent land situated in front of the Gran Hotel Colón; while the Hippodrome will be built on very suitable land at the Hacienda de Peguerillas, according to reports from various experts, brought to this place for this purpose".

=== Early success ===
Inaugurated on 13 August 1892, Campo del Velódromo went on to host the many sporting events of the commemorative festivities, which took place in the months of August, September, and October, and which included bicycle races, regattas, and matches of cricket and football. The first football matches were reserved for the culmination of the IV Centenary commemorations, which was scheduled for October in order to coincide with the royal family's visit to Huelva and also for the many British footballers in Huelva to not play football in the middle of the Andalusian summer, since they were not accustomed to high temperatures.

In 1897, Muñoz was president of the organizing committee of bicycle races at Campo del Velódromo, and in 1898, he represented Recreativo in the cycling events held in Calañas, as part of the festival program of this municipality.

=== Golden years ===
At the turn of the century, football already was the dominant activity within the club, so they took up permanent residence at the Velódromo. Therefore, Recreativo worked hard to improve it, building a new pavilion and new facilities, which were "unofficially" inaugurated on 15 October 1904, with a football match between the Onubense Club and the Riotinto Club. The official inauguration of the new facilities took place three weeks later, on 6 November, with a match between Recreativo and the British sailors of the Seamen's Institute, which won 4–2, thus keeping the so-called Copa Seamen's Institute. Two weeks later, on 20 November, Recreativo won the rematch to claim this Cup, thus lifting its first-ever trophy, a historic moment that did not happen at the Velodrome, but instead near the Anglican Chapel of the "Seamen's Institute".

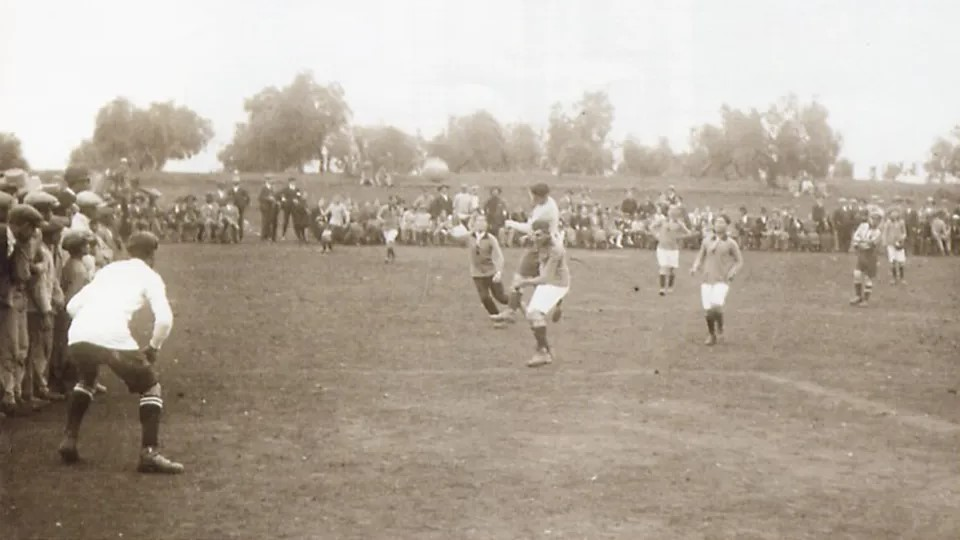
The first match between Recreativo and Real Betis in January 1910.

During the first half of the 1910s, the Velodrome served as the home of the first Andalusian Championships, which were considered unofficial due to being organized by Recreativo itself, who won three consecutive editions between 1910 and 1912. In the 1910 edition, the Velodrome hosted for the first time Real Betis, still under its original name of Sevilla Balompié, which lost to the local team by a score of 4–0. They played a further 12 unofficial (friendlies) matches in the Velodrome before finally playing their first official match there on 10 November 1918, already part of the Andalusian Championship organized by the Andalusia Regional Federation; the locals won 3–1. Betis had to wait five years to finally achieving its first official win at the Velodrome in January 1923, again in the Andalusian Championship, with Betis going on to win the next five Andalusian Championship matches at the Velodrome, a streak that lasted until 1939. Throughout its history, Campo del Velódromo hosted seven matches with Real Betis, with Hércules winning 3, drawing 2, and losing 2, with 8 goals scored and 5 conceded.

=== Decline and Collapse ===
The Campo del Velódromo served as the home of Recreativo for 65 years, from 1892 until 1957, when the club moved to the newly built Estadio Colombino, which was a much more comfortable and functional stadium.

== Legacy ==
After the disappearance of the Velodrome in the late 1960s, the site that it occupied was soon taken over by buildings for housing, as well as a luxurious hotel and the Palace of Justice. On 25 February 1981, the square were the Velodrome used to be, located near the Alameda Sundheim, was accordingly named Plaza del Velódromo, and in the following year, on 20 August 1892, the square saw the unveiling of a monument in honour of the Velodrome, created by sculptor Juan Manuel Seisdedos, and which suffered a restoration in 2019 that "respected the initial shapes and proportions, but has introduced more modern techniques to achieve a greater enhancement of the entire sculpture and a definitive duration". Furthermore, this square hosts the so-called El Velódromo kiosk, which has one exterior wall covered by tile that recalls that football was played for the first time in Spain in that place.
