= José Ochoa (footballer) =

Spanish footballer and sports leader

Personal information
- Full name: José Ochoa de Mora
- Date of birth: 1894
- Place of birth: Huelva, Andalusia, Spain
- Position: Defender

Senior career*
Years	Team	Apps	(Gls)
1915–1918	Recreativo de Huelva		
5th president of Recreativo de Huelva
In office 1924–1927
Preceded by	William Alexander Mackay
Succeeded by	Montagú Brown
- * Club domestic league appearances and goals

José Ochoa de Mora was a Spanish footballer who played as a defender for Recreativo de Huelva in the late 1910s, and who later served as its 5th president from 1924 until 1927, thus becoming the first former Huelva player to become the club's president.

== Early life ==
José Ochoa de Mora was born in the Andalusian town of Huelva in 1894, as the son of Juan Ochoa Parias (1865–?) and Dolores Mora Claros (1869–?).

== Career ==
Ochoa began his football career at his hometown club Recreativo de Huelva in 1915. Together with Gregorio Navarro, Manuel Chazarry, and the Mata brothers (Alfonso and Manuel), he was a member of the Huelva team that won the 1917–18 Andalusian championship, thus qualifying for the 1918 Copa del Rey, where they were knocked out in the semifinals by Madrid FC. In 1924, William Alexander Mackay, who had been Recreativo's president since 1896, resigned from his post, and was replaced by Ochoa, who thus became not only the club's first-ever Spanish president, but also the first-ever former Recreativo player to become the club's president. He held the presidency for three years, from 1924 until 1927, being then replaced by Montagú Brown.

== Honours ==
Recreativo de Huelva

- Andalusian Championship:
  - Champions (1): 1918
