= Rio Tinto massacre =

1888 mass killing in Andalusia, Spain

On 4 February 1888, Spanish civil guards fired on a crowd of protesting Rio Tinto Company mineworkers in Zalamea, killing 13 and injuring 35.

== Background ==
In early 1888, Anti-Smoke League agriculturalists and Rio Tinto workers came together to protest the company practice of open-air pyrite calcination in blast furnaces. It was an unlikely alliance, as the Anti-Smoke League desired an end to calcination, based on what the toxic fumes did to local farmland, but the workers understood its necessity and were willing to accept recompense in exchange for periods when smoke prevented normal work. The anarchist protest leaders held that they shared more important long-term goals, however, of deposing foreign capitalist interests, and used the issue of fumes to stand a class-based opposition to Rio Tinto. Beginning in January, the Anti-Smoke League funded the militant anarchist Maximiliano Tornet, formerly of Cuba, to roil the workers to action, resulting in demands for improved pay and conditions. Other area anarchist groups pledged their support to protest against the company.

== Protest and massacre ==
At noon on 4 February 1888, several thousand rank and file—agriculturalists, anarchists, and mikeworkers—marched from Zalamea to the Rio Tinto town hall (ayuntamiento) to deliver their petitions to the mayor. While the mayor spoke with the crowd's representatives, the Huelva military governor and civil guards watched over the protest. The military governor's attempts to disperse the crowd only incensed it further. The civil guards, under perceived threat of mob violence, fired on the crowd, killing 13 and injuring 35. Other casualty estimates vary widely. One counts 45 dead and 70–100 wounded.

== Aftermath and legacy ==
Having failed in the protest's aims, a number of workers turned from anarchism to socialism for social change, though mineworkers would largely continue to associate with anarchism for another decade. The protest's leaders, including Tornet, left or were driven from the mines. Anarchism in the region returned to a more collectivist approach, with specific, targeted strikes rather than general strikes.

Charles E. Harvey, who wrote a history of the Rio Tinto Company, described this protest as the only regional example prior to 1900 of anarchist action based on confronting class differences ("communalist" anarchism) as opposed to reformist actions based on unions ("collectivist" anarchism).

== See also ==
- Compañía Española de Minas de Río Tinto
- Rio Tinto Company Limited
- Riotinto Railway

== Bibliography ==
- Castillo Cañiz, Assumpta (12 December 2020). "Violence Against Strikers in the Rural Peripheries of the Iberian Peninsula, 1890–1915". In Millan, Matteo; Saluppo, Alessandro (eds.). Corporate Policing, Yellow Unionism, and Strikebreaking, 1890–1930: In Defence of Freedom. Routledge. pp. 44–61. doi:10.4324/9780429354243-4. ISBN 978-0-429-35424-3.
- Harvey, Charles E. (1981). The Rio Tinto Company: An Economic History of a Leading International Mining Concern, 1873-1954. Alison Hodge Publishers. ISBN 978-0-906720-03-5.
