= Charles Wilson Adam =

Scottish engineer and sportsperson

Charles Adam
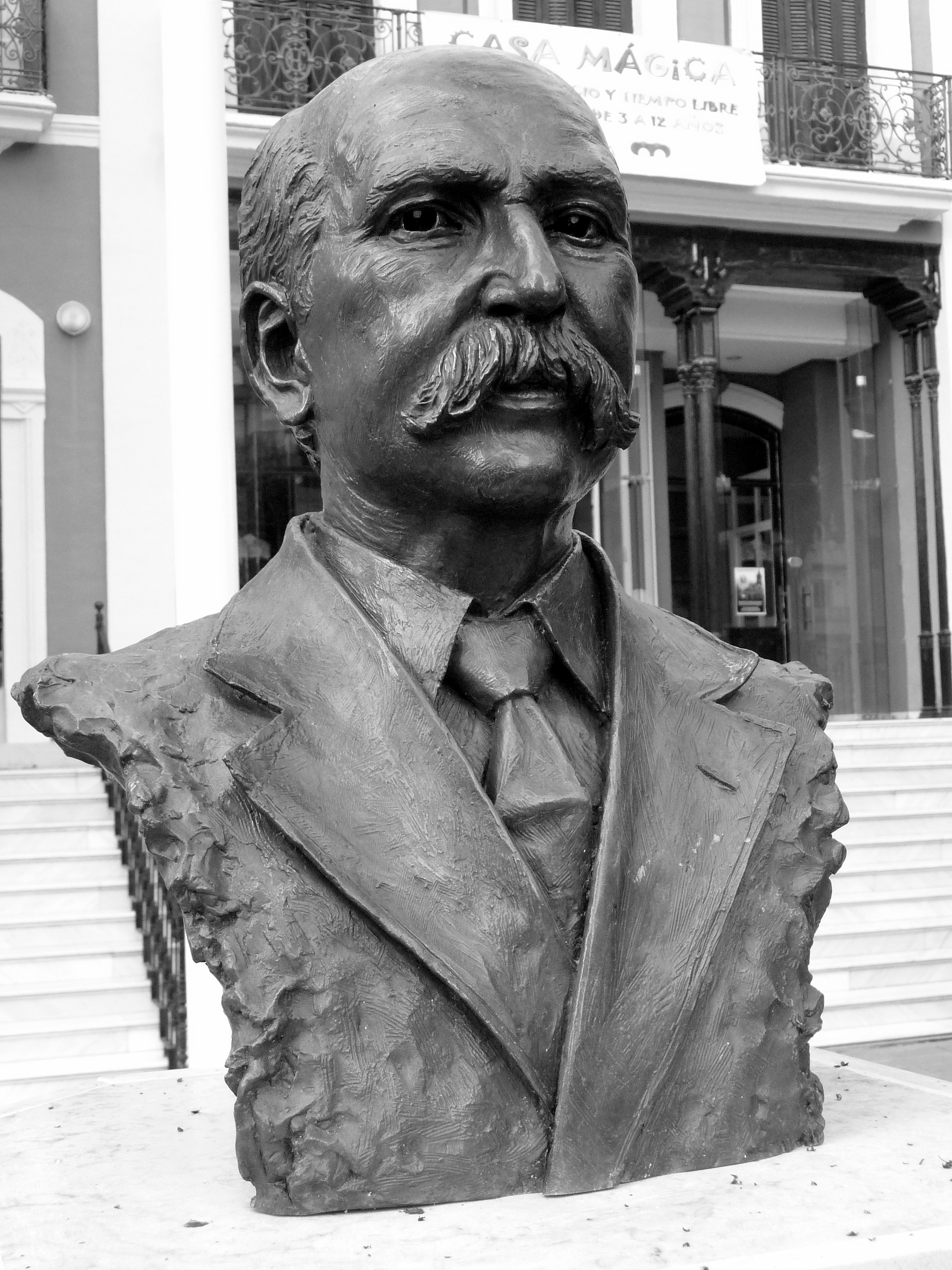
- Bust of Charles Adam, a monument at Casa Colón inaugurated in 2008
- Born: Charles Wilson Adam; 31 October 1848; Paisley, Scotland
- Died: 3 September 1924 (aged 75); Loughborough, England
- Citizenship: Spanish
- Occupations: Engineer; Draughtsman; Sportsperson
- Known for: First president of Recreativo de Huelva

1st President of Recreativo de Huelva
- In office 18 December 1889 – 29 November 1896
- Succeeded by: William Alexander Mackay

Charles Wilson Adam (31 October 1848 – 3 September 1924) was a Scottish engineer who served as the first president of Spanish club Recreativo de Huelva from 1889 to 1896.

== Early and personal life ==
Charles Wilson Adam was born on 31 October 1848, (Note: Some sources wrongly claim that he was born in 1845.) in Paisley, a town near Glasgow, as one of ten children from the marriage of John Adam (1809–1880), a butcher, and Janet Wilson (1813–?). While the sport of football was booming in the West of Scotland, he studied at the University of Glasgow to work as an engineer and draughtsman.

On 6 March 1873, Adam married Flora MacLean, setting up a home in the town, but she died just two years later, on 13 June 1875, at their home in Paisley, so he remarried three years later, in 1878, to an Italian-Scot Maria Henriette Collier, in the Italian town of Torre Pellice, in Piedmont. Her father, Hippolyte Collier, was a Waldensians minister who had to flee Italy in the 1860s, settling in Glasgow, where Maria lived since she was a child. The couple had five children, all born in Huelva: Robert Wilson, Flora, Maria, Isabel, and John Mackay, as well as two other children who were buried in the British cemetery in Huelva, who died in infancy: Charles Bert and Marie Charlotte.

In 1879, Adam and his wife moved to Huelva after he was hired as an engineer to direct the Gas Factory that was being built at the end of La Merced by the Huelva Gas Company, which had the concession of the gas lighting service for the streets of Huelva. His family initially lived in the house next to the Gas Factory during the 1880s, but they moved in 1894 to La Fuente Street, where they would reside until 1912. In 1895 his friend and countryman Dr. William Alexander Mackay moved to live on the same street, right across from them, and because of their close relationship, Mackay acted as godfather to his youngest son, John Mackay Adam, who was born that year. From 1913 onwards, Adam and his family moved to a chalet at number 20 Alameda Sundheim. The local press describes "Don Carlos" as a true English gentleman, respectful, and very fond of the habits of life in Huelva.

In the Spanish press, he was sometimes referred to as Carlos Adam, and sometimes his name was misspelled as Charles Adams.

== Sporting activity ==
=== Sports pioneer in Huelva ===
In either 1883 or 1884, Adam, now a manager of the local gasworks, met Mackay, who approached him to ask for permission to organize football and cricket matches on a plot of land that had been given to Adam's gasworks by the city council, located at the end of Vega Larga, opposite to the Gas Factory, right in front of the current La Merced bullring. By allowing it, Adam thus provided the land for the club's first ground.

Mackay then used that land to establish the so-called Recreo de Huelva, organizing several football and cricket matches between the miners who worked in the Rio Tinto Company Limited and the company employees who lived in Huelva, and eventually also against crews of English ships who docked in the port of Huelva, ranging from sailors to captains through officers; Adam appears in some of the earliest known cricket line-ups of Recreo. The local press of the time stated that he was a magnificent cricket player, a land-tennis player, and an enthusiastic follower of all sports activities. Adam and Mackay, both good sportsmen who carried out all their professional work in Huelva, forged a great friendship between them from the very beginning, as both lived far from their common land and given their common interests in sports.

In order to promote sport among the young people of his adopted country, Adam often used his own money for the purchase of tickets for any sporting event, which he then distributed for free.

=== President of Recreativo de Huelva ===
After a few years of consolidating these sports practices, they decided to take a further step, and on 18 December 1889, they were among the seven members who founded Huelva Recreation Club, and even though Mackay was the fundamental head behind the club's creation, it was Adam, the eldest of the group and owner of the land where the games were played, who was elected as the club's first-ever president, and this position was then ratified as such at the meeting of 23 December 1889, in which four more member were added for a total of 11. Mackay was only a member of the club's first board of directors, while Adam's vice-president was the 27-year-old Gavin Speirs, also an engineer. A few months later, on 8 March 1890, Huelva faced Sevilla FC in the first official football match in Spain, and although it ended in a 2–0 loss, the football players were rewarded in that same evening with a dinner, held in the large hall of the Hotel Colón, in which Adam made a toast to the royal families of Spain and Great Britain.

Under his presidency, Adam signed, among others, the plans to close the Gasworks grounds in 1888, and then turned it into a playing field, the so-called Campo del Velódromo in June 1892, a sports venue that he promoted and designed as a member of the club's board, together with Mackay, and which was inaugurated by Recreativo on 20 August of that year, suitable for the practice of football and cricket. During his mandate, he insisted that the club should be open to all the inhabitants of the port city, local or expatriate alike, but only after they all bought his gas. This is why the Spanish surnames like Coto and Duclós were included in the first Recreativo team. From 1890 onwards, he began organizing on an annual basis, the celebration of the so-called Juegos Olímpicos (Olympic Games) in Huelva, six years before they were officially established by Pierre de Coubertain.

In 1891, most of the founders and promoters of Recreativo, including Adam, founded an organization called "Seamen's Institute", which was meant to provide shelter, entertainment, and company to the English sailors who anchored their ships at the port of Huelva for relatively long periods while they waited for the mineral and finished loading it onto the ships. Adam held this position for nearly seven years, from 18 December 1889 to 29 November 1896, the year in which he resigned, being replaced by Mackay, who in turn held this position for nearly three decades until 1924, except for a brief period in 1903.

== Later life ==
Despite the competitiveness of electricity, gas remained in Huelva until nearly the 1920s, and after his working period, Adam returned to his native Scotland in either 1909 or early 1910, since his eldest son Robert already was the director of the Gas Factory by 23 June 1910. Although his daughter Maria married in the British Consulate in Seville, both she and her sister Isabel eventually returned to Great Britain, while the other, Flora, died in Tasmania. Both of his sons decided to stay in Huelva, with his eldest son, Robert, playing cricket at Recreativo as early as 1902, being mentioned in the line-ups as Berti, and he won several of the athletic events organized by the club on 29 October 1904; he continued to reside in Huelva, and became a shipping agent. (Note: On 10 July 1916, the local press stated that "the young wife and children of our distinguished friend Don Roberto W. Adam went to the picturesque beach of Punta Umbría to spend some time there".)

On the other hand, his youngest, John, who was usually called Jack, played football at the club from a young age, advancing through the various youth teams until making his debut in the first team in 1911. He was regular in the club's line-ups for five years, from 1911 to 1916, probably thanks to the influence of the then president Mackay, who despite being a whole sea away from his friend Adam, kept looking after son. Jack played as a winger and helped his side win three unofficial Andalusian Championship which Recreativo itself organized, and the Copa Centenario de las Cortes de Cádiz in 1912. Other sources state that Jack was a prominent striker for Recre between 1910 and 1915.

== Death ==
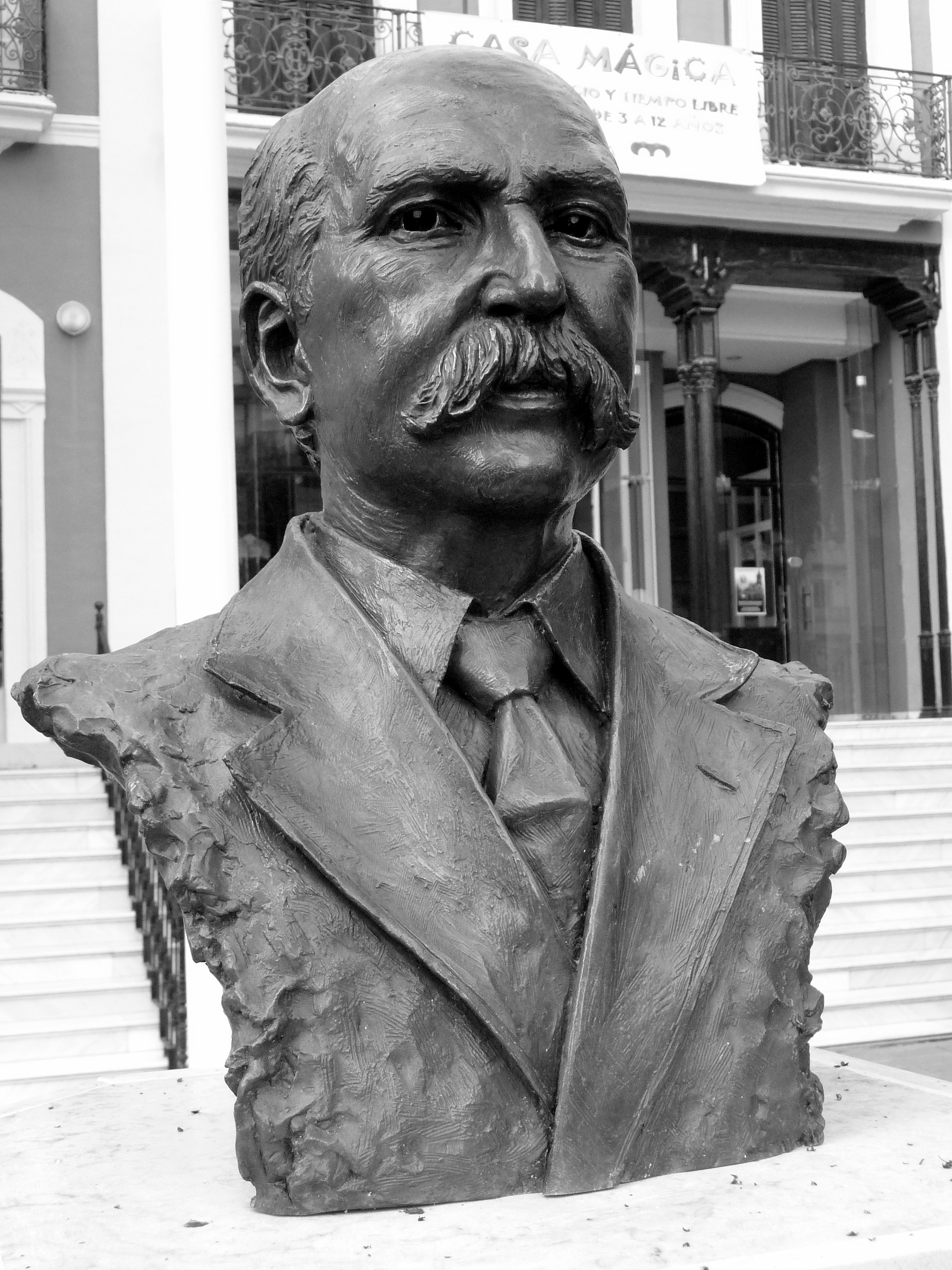
Bust of Charles Adam, a monument at Casa Colón inaugurated on 18 December 2008.

Despite the weddings of his children and the births of his grandchildren, Adam never returned to Huelva, perhaps because his state of health did not allow it. He thus died in Loughborough, England, on 3 September 1924, at the age of 75, but the news did not reach Huelva until a few days later, on 8 September, and his great friend Mackay was so affected by this news that he left the club's presidency just two days later, after nearly three decades at the helm of the club, being replaced by a Huelva native, the former player José Ochoa de Mora.

== Legacy ==
On 18 December 2008, on the 119th birthday of the club's foundation, the City Council of Huelva inaugurated a bust of Charles Adam in the front gardens of the Casa Colón at an event attended by the mayor of Huelva, Pedro Rodríguez, by the president of the Huelva foundation, Francisco Mendoza, and also by the author of the work, Elías Rodríguez Picón, who later stated that the work was a real challenge, as there are only a couple of photographs of the character that the Huelva club owned.
