= Club Inglés Bella Vista =

Spanish multi-sports club

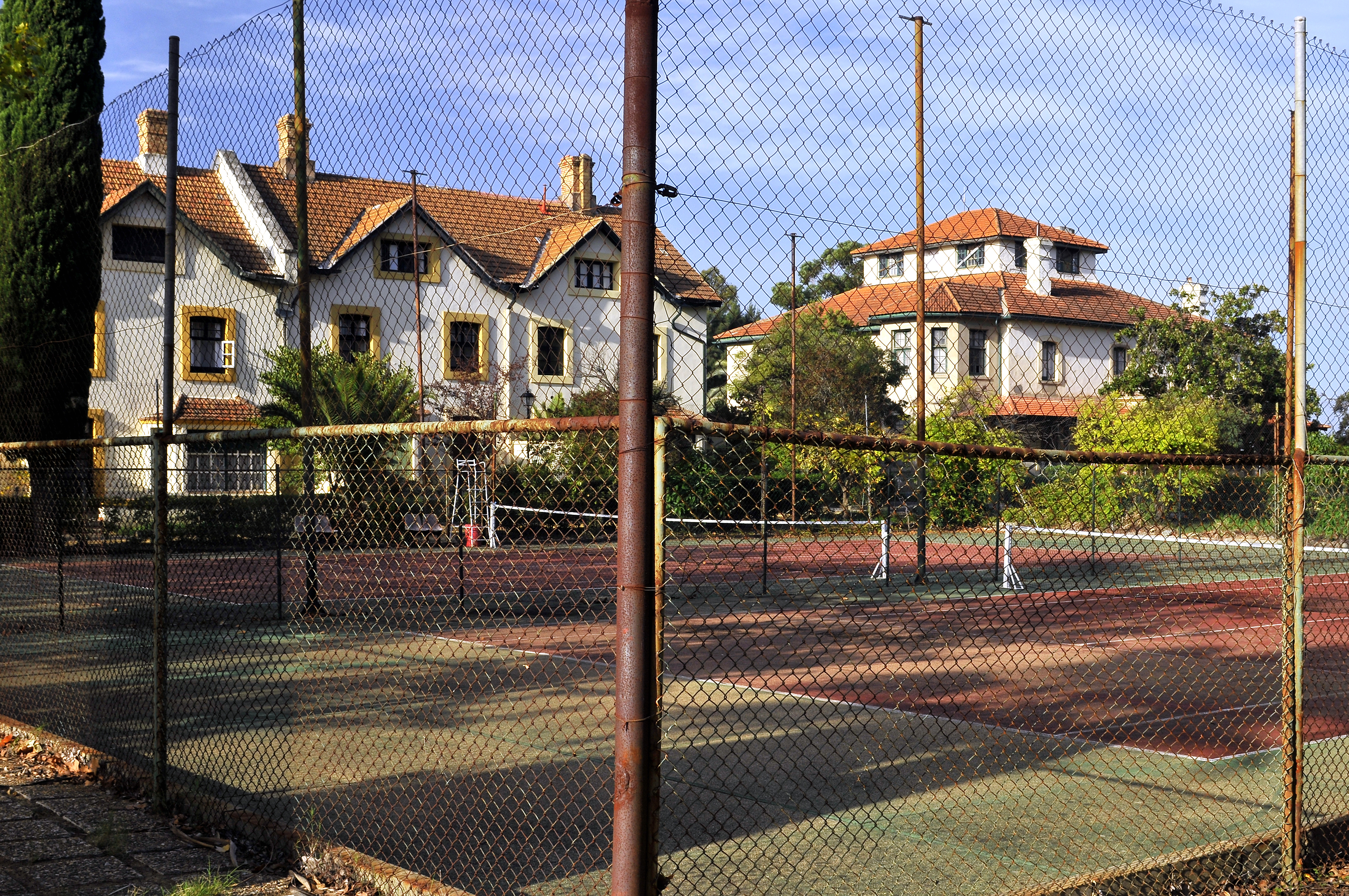
- Tennis courts in the neighborhood of Bellavista. Tennis was one of the most popular sports among members of the English Club.
- Founded: 1878
- Location: Minas de Riotinto, Spain

The Club Inglés Bella Vista (also known as English Club of Bella Vista) is a cultural institution that exists in the Spanish municipality of Minas de Riotinto, in the province of Huelva.

It was founded in 1878 by members of the British colony of Minas de Riotinto who worked for the Rio Tinto Company Limited, and it soon become the center of social life in that British colony. Together with Exiles Cable Club (1873) in Vigo, this was one of the first companies dedicated to sports in the country, most notably, cricket, tennis and football, having sections dedicated to the said sports due to its prominence in England, the homeland of the company's Staff.

== Background ==
The copper mines of Rio Tinto had been exploited since the ancient times, but during the second half of the 19th century, English investors nailed it down, and in 1873, they founded the Rio Tinto Company Limited (RTCL), who soon won a concession to exploit the mines which were previously run by the state, the First Spanish Republic. The Englishmen who worked in the mines did not have much to do in the small town, so they gathered to play their favorite sports, like cricket, rugby, and football. Although the first football games were played in 1873, it was not until 1878 that it was formed the Club Inglés (English club) to promote culture, sport, and spare time among the workers.

== Origins ==
In 1878, the Rio Tinto Company founded a place intended for entertainment and recreation of the English colony, Club Inglés Bella Vista, which had three sports sections called Cricket Club Río Tinto, Lawn-Tennis Río Tinto and Foot-Ball Club Río Tinto. The company's membership was initially restricted to technicians from the Rio Tinto Company Limited (RTC) who resided in the area.

On 4 December, the new building built and furnished by the Río Tinto Company to be the headquarters of its club was inaugurated at Calle Sanz in the old village of Minas de Río Tinto. During its first years of existence, the Río Tinto club encouraged and promoted the practice of sports and cultural activities. The British colony in the area kept growing throughout the 1880s and began to spread its influence to a place distant from the historic town, later known as the Bella Vista neighborhood. These residents would request a place where they could carry out their activities without having to travel to Río Tinto, so in 1884, a wooden pavilion was built in Bella Vista to serve as the seat of the social club.

== Massive success ==
From that moment, Bellavista became the center of social, sports, and recreational activities in the British colony of Río Tinto. Later, in 1903, a brick building would be erected to house the new headquarters. The club came to have several rooms, such as a reading room with British books, newspapers, and magazines, or a room for exclusively male use. Several sports fields would also be built in Bellavista, where cricket, badminton, tennis, football, or polo were practiced. The British community would also practice water sports in the Zumajo reservoir. Social events held at the club ranged from dances and costume parties to celebrations for the coronations of monarchs such as George VI in 1937 and Elizabeth II in 1953. The Club Inglés also came to host celebrations organized by RTC to mark the end of the First Boer War, World War I, and World War II.

== Tennis ==
Tennis began to be practiced for the first time in Spain in Minas de Riotinto and it was one of the sports that took root the most in Huelva because they were among the sports practiced by the local population, and proof of this is the organization of the first Tennis championship, held in 1912.

== Football team ==
A certain William Bice is said to have organized the first "kick-abouts" between the club's members, which were possibly the very first kick to a football ball on Spanish soil. (Note: In that same year, another colony of British workers did the same in Vigo, with the investigations about which one was the dean of football in Spain remaining inconclusive and open to debate by historians.) More formalized football games followed the initial ones by August 1874. Railwaymen, dockers, and soldiers alike in the Huelva port are also, said to have played football in Río Tinto. This colony eventually gave birth to a club in 1878, the Rio Tinto English Club, where the mine workers played their favorite sports, such as cricket, rugby, and football, thus forming a team known as the Foot-Ball Club of Río Tinto, or Rio Tinto FC. The first president of this club was the Scot John Sutherland Mackay, the newly-arrived company doctor, and the first football figures of the club were employees of the RTCL, such as Juan Cunningham, Robert Geoghegham, William Waterston, Swaby, and Charles Robert Julian, with the latter being at the 1920 Olympic Games in Antwerp, while the remaining four all played for Recreativo Huelva in the 1905 Copa del Rey.

There are reports of games between Rio Tinto and Huelva in 1882; for instance, Daniel Macmillan Young, one of the Scots mining employees, claimed to have played for the team in 1881, although under different rules than those officially imposed years later, and in fact, in 1882, he described a football match in the local press, stating "We may have to wait for some time to witness another match as well organized and balanced; Rio Tinto had some tough players, but Huelva played with greater subtlety and craftiness, being on the attack throughout the game, but at the last minute it was Rio Tinto that netted the winning goal". In 1886, the Rio Tinto FC was the first in Spain to adhere to the Regulations of the International Football Association Board (IFAB); however, these teams were never officially established, so there is no legal record of their existence.

This club remained under the name of Riotinto FC until 1932, when it was refounded as Balompié Rio Tinto, which had been founded in 1914 by José María Fontela Granado from Rio Tinto, and the Englishman Robert Wilson, with the latter becoming president.

== Legacy ==
The importance of Rio Tinto is that the British left a legacy and ended up creating the Recreativo de Huelva (then Huelva Recreation Club) in 1889. There was continuity.

— Alejandro Quiroga

Inspired by Rio Tinto FC, Dr. William Alexander Mackay created the Sociedad de Juego de Pelota (Spanish: Ball Game Society), which organized football and cricket games, usually between his compatriots living in Riotinto and crews of the British ships who docked in the port of Huelva, ranging from sailors to captains through officers. These matches were held in a large opposite the Gas Factory run by fellow Scotsman Charles Wilson Adam, who also played in some cricket matches himself. After a few years of consolidating these sports practices, they decided to take a further step, and on 18 December 1889, they were among the seven members who founded Huelva Recreation Club, a sports club originally intended to provide physical recreation for the Rio Tinto mineworkers to improve their health.
