= Rio Tinto Company Limited =

Founding company of the Rio Tinto Group conglomerate. 1873-1962

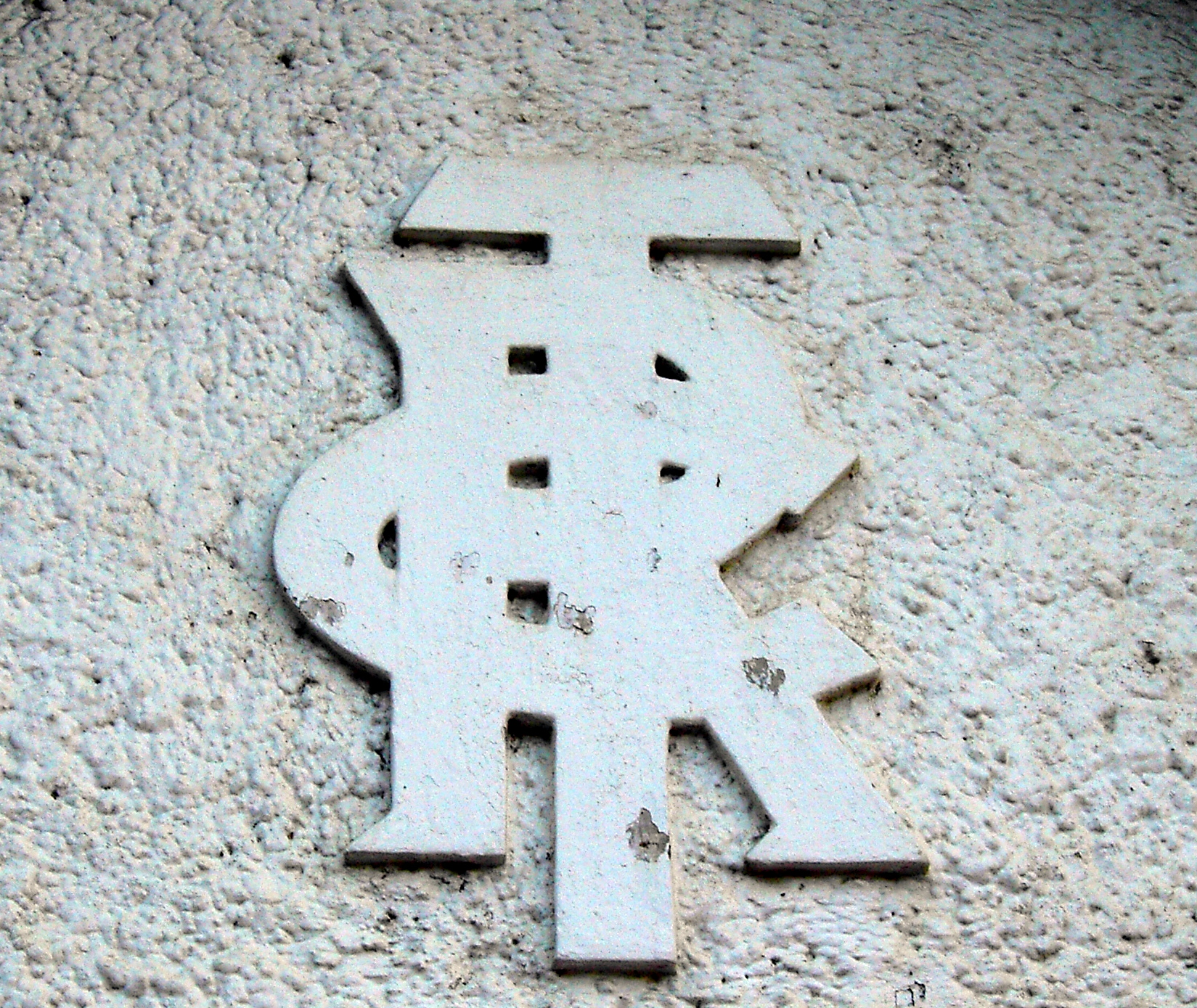

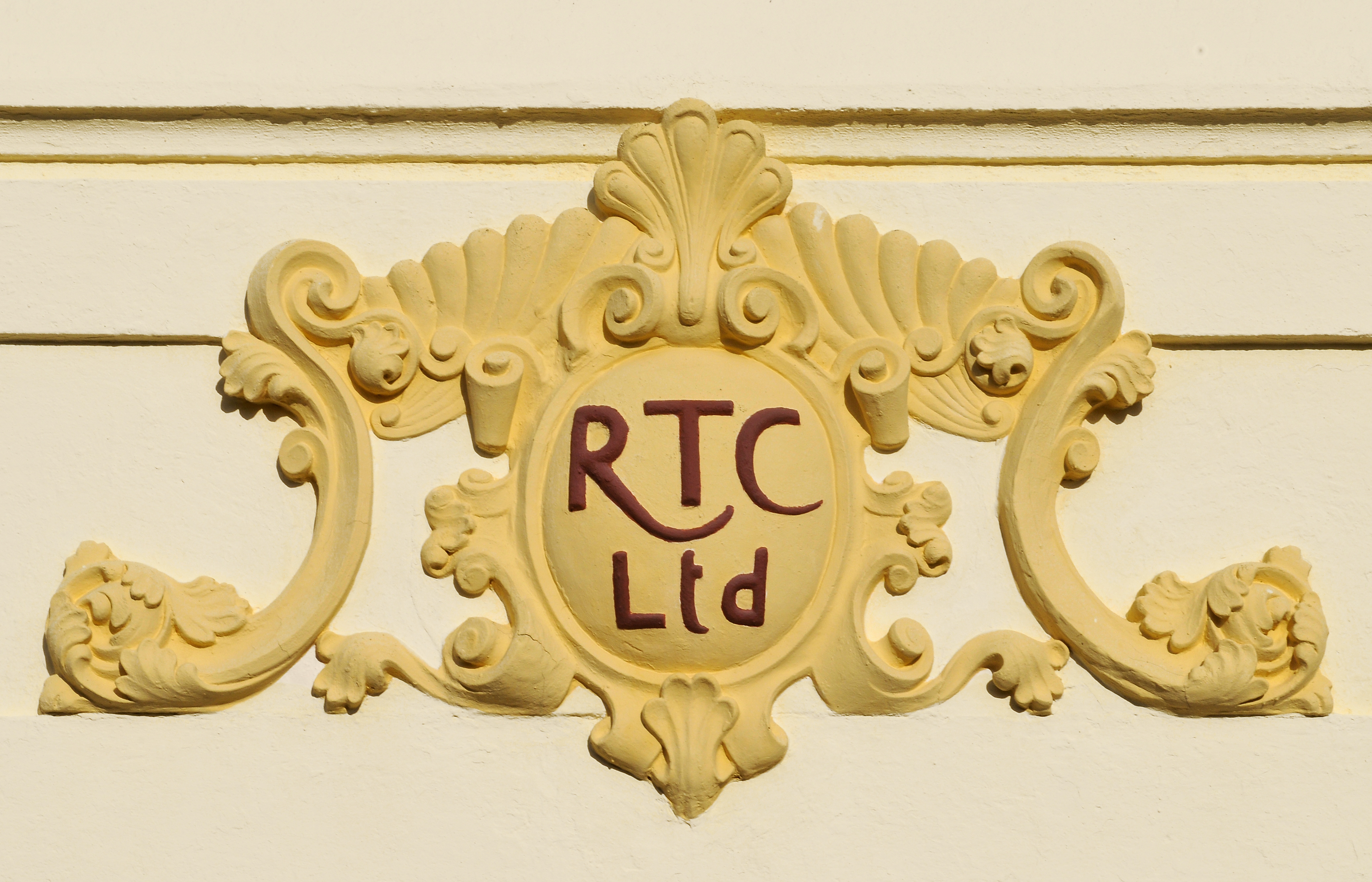
- Type: S.A.
- Industry: Mining, Chemicals
- Founded: 1873
- Defunct: 1989
- Headquarters: London; Minas de Riotinto
- Parent: Rio Tinto

The Rio Tinto Company Limited (RTC) was one of the founding companies of [Rio Tinto (corporation)|Rio Tinto]], which was responsible of the exploitation of the Riotinto-Nerva mining basin in Minas de Riotinto between 1873 and 1954.

It was founded in 1873 by British capitalists to take over the exploitation of a series of sites in the Riotinto-Nerva mining basin that they had acquired from the Spanish State that same year. During the following decades, the extraction of minerals in the area experienced a major growth, with the development of various mining and metallurgical activities. Under British exploitation, the Riotinto mines became "a world reference". The RTC was the builder and owner of the railroad line that connected the mines with the port of Huelva, where it built a commercial pier to facilitate the unloading and transport of the extracted material by sea. Likewise, the company had a great influence in the region and the province beyond the merely economic. The harsh working conditions of the miners led to numerous conflicts between them and the RTC management.

In addition to the Riotinto mines, the company expanded its operations to Africa in the 1920s. After the Spanish Civil War, the political and economic context in Spain became much more adverse, conditioning the future of the business. In 1954, the company's assets in Huelva were divested and sold to a local consortium, thus creating the Compañía Española de Minas de Río Tinto. Meanwhile, in 1962, RTC merged with the Australian company Consolidated Zinc to form the Rio Tinto-Zinc Corporation, branching out to other parts of the world.

== Background ==
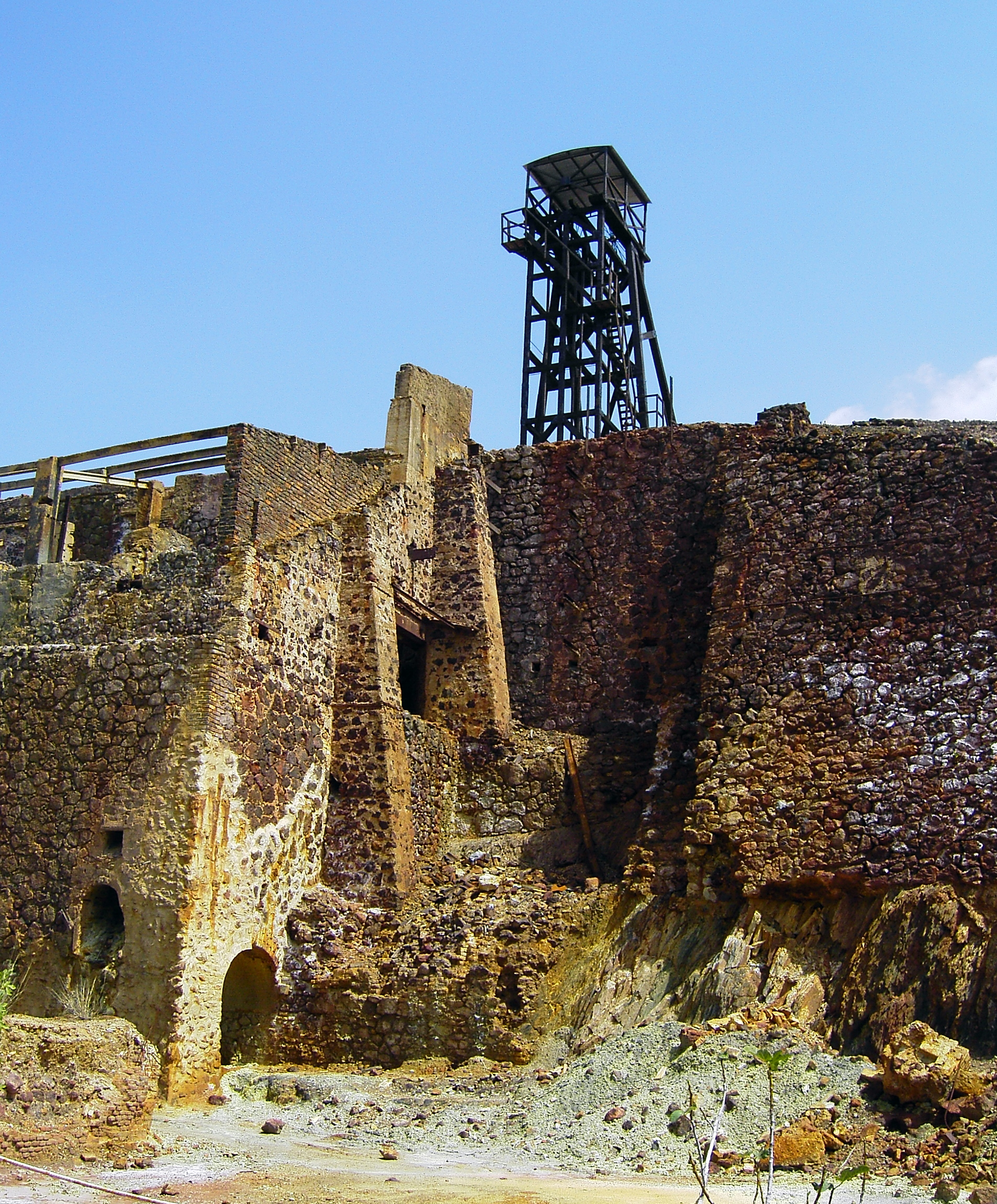
Reproduction of the malacate in the old Peña del Hierro Mine

The area of the Iberian Pyrite Belt had already been exploited for more than 3000 years — in the Chalcolithic and by peoples such as Tartessians, Phoenicians and Romans, who extracted iron pyrites, copper, silver and other metals from them. As a result of the metallurgical operations, there is evidence that the Romans would have left more than fifteen million tons of slag in the Riotinto area during a period characterized by new extraction techniques with furnaces and new tools — such as norias or the Archimedes' screw — because, when the phreatic level was exceeded, it was necessary to drain the numerous subsoil waters. Centuries later, the Almohads did not work much on the extraction of minerals (blue vitriol and green vitriol) but they worked on the extraction of different materials to create dyes.

As early as 1556, the mines were about to be exploited again during the reign of Philip II, who needed to finance the numerous wars of the Empire. This attempt failed, since the studies of the time considered their exploitation unfeasible and unprofitable. In 1725, the Swede Liebert Wolters Vonsiohielm got the authorities to grant him the exploitation of the sites, under lease, for thirty years. During that time, Wolters would exploit the mines together with his nephew and a Spanish associate. The mines returned to the State in 1783, to be managed by the State again until 1810, when they were closed due to the War of Independence. Between 1815 and 1823, only the sour waters were precariously exploited. The failure in mining exploitation during that period can be explained by the difficulty, and above all the high cost, of transporting the minerals to the sea when there was still no railroad line and transporting them by pack animals was the only option. It was towards the end of the 19th century that the private initiative was interested in renting them again.

== Operational history ==
=== The acquisition of the mines ===
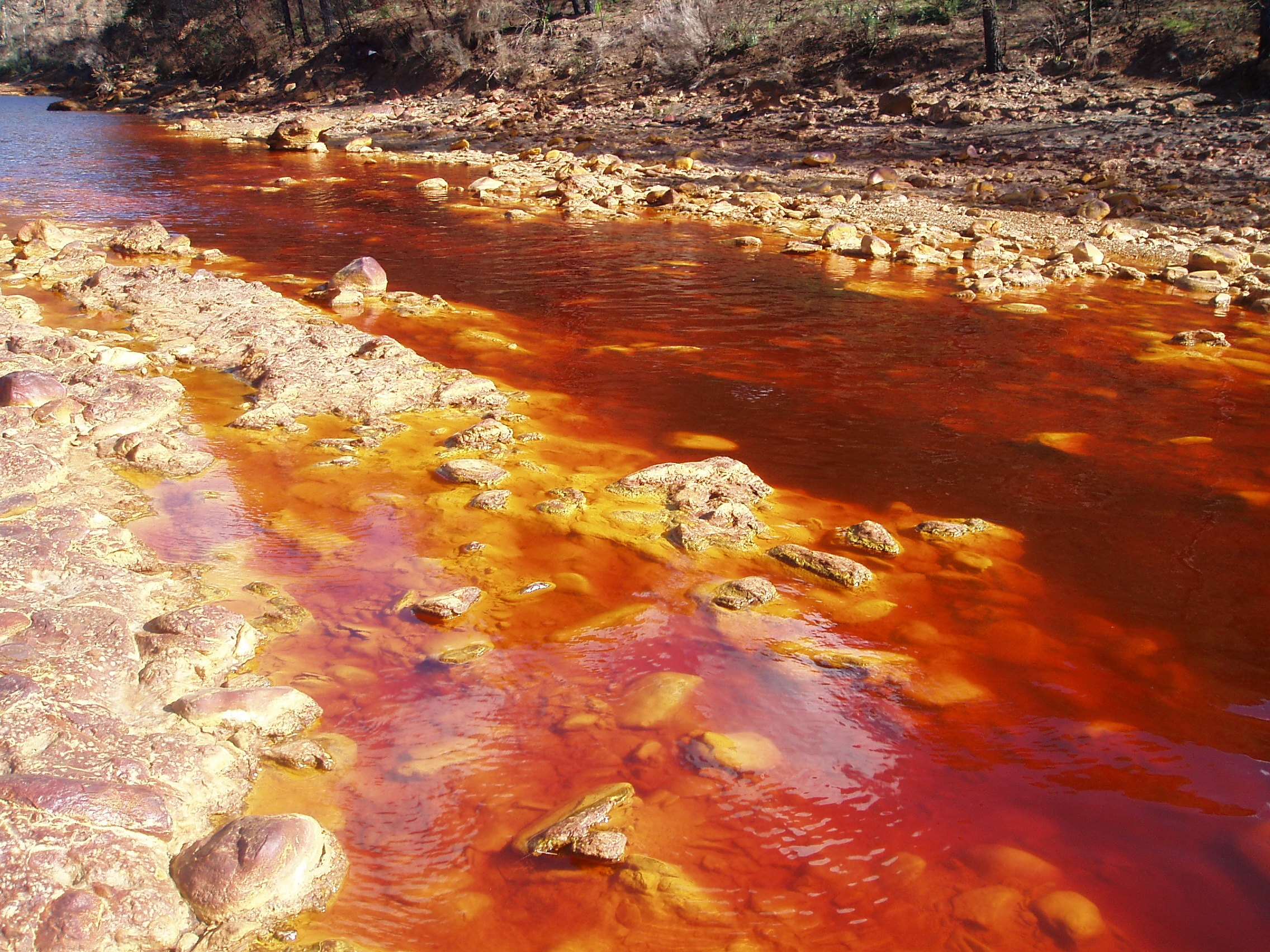
The Tinto river, after which the company was named, runs rust-colored into the ocean, tinted by minerals

In 1873, the mines were bought by English bidders — who created a consortium for its exploitation — from the government of the First Republic (practically saved from bankruptcy by this sale) for 94,000,000 pesetas. However, it is worth mentioning that the foreign presence in the area dated back to the 18th century, with leasing companies such as Robert Wolters. The take-off of industrialization in highly developed countries had led various companies to seek new minerals and deposits for their growth. Likewise, the increase in employment needs caused a rapid growth in the area and even in Huelva. The reason behind the private interest in these mines has its origin in the new central laws of 1849 and 1859, overcoming a previous interventionist regime to move to a new one that greatly favored private initiative. But it was really the Ley de Bases de 29 de diciembre de 1868 sobre minas and the Ley de 19 de octubre de 1869 that favored the creation of private and industrial trading companies.

Thus, on February 14, 1873, after an unsuccessful auction, the mines were acquired through direct sale by an international consortium created, among others, by three powerful families, the Mathesons, the Rothschilds and the Goldschimidt — owner of the Deutsche National Bank of Bremen. This consortium later found the Rio Tinto Company Limited, with a capital of six million pounds sterling. The purchase of the mines was accompanied by a concession from the State so that the British company could build a railroad linking Riotinto with the port of Huelva. Construction of the line was started in June 1873.

=== Beginning and expansion years ===
Rio Tinto Company Limited's board of directors met for the first time in London on March 31, 1873, under the chairmanship of Hugh Matheson. One of its first decisions was the construction of a railway line, under the advice of the engineer George Barclay Bruce. The first years of the RTC were difficult: the shareholders had to make large investments and face strong criticism for the lack of profits. Once this initial stage was over, the situation underwent a considerable change. The British company — having obtained the rights to exploit the copper, silver and gold of the mines — initially brought about the resurgence of the region by opening new exploitation areas and developing inland mining. Its production, which left Spain through the Huelva estuary, turned the company into one of the largest in all of Europe and — in the words of businessman and historian David Avery — made Riotinto (in 1884) "the largest mining center in the world". By the late 1880s, control of the Riotinto company was transferred to the Rothschild family, who bet on increasing the scale of the mining workings.

At its peak, Riotinto became a small English colony thanks to the mine, a "Gibraltar sui generis", as the local writer and poet Juan Cobos Wilkins called it. The luxurious and exclusive Bellavista Neighborhood was built a few meters away from the excavations for the English personnel, which could be accessed after passing through a sentry box with guards; a Victorian style neighborhood that was equipped with tennis courts, golf courses, its own cemetery, a Social Club or even a Presbyterian church. Meanwhile, in the original Spanish town, the church or the Plaza de la Constitución — where years before the massacre of the "Año de los tiros" had taken place — ended up being buried under the slag from the excavations.

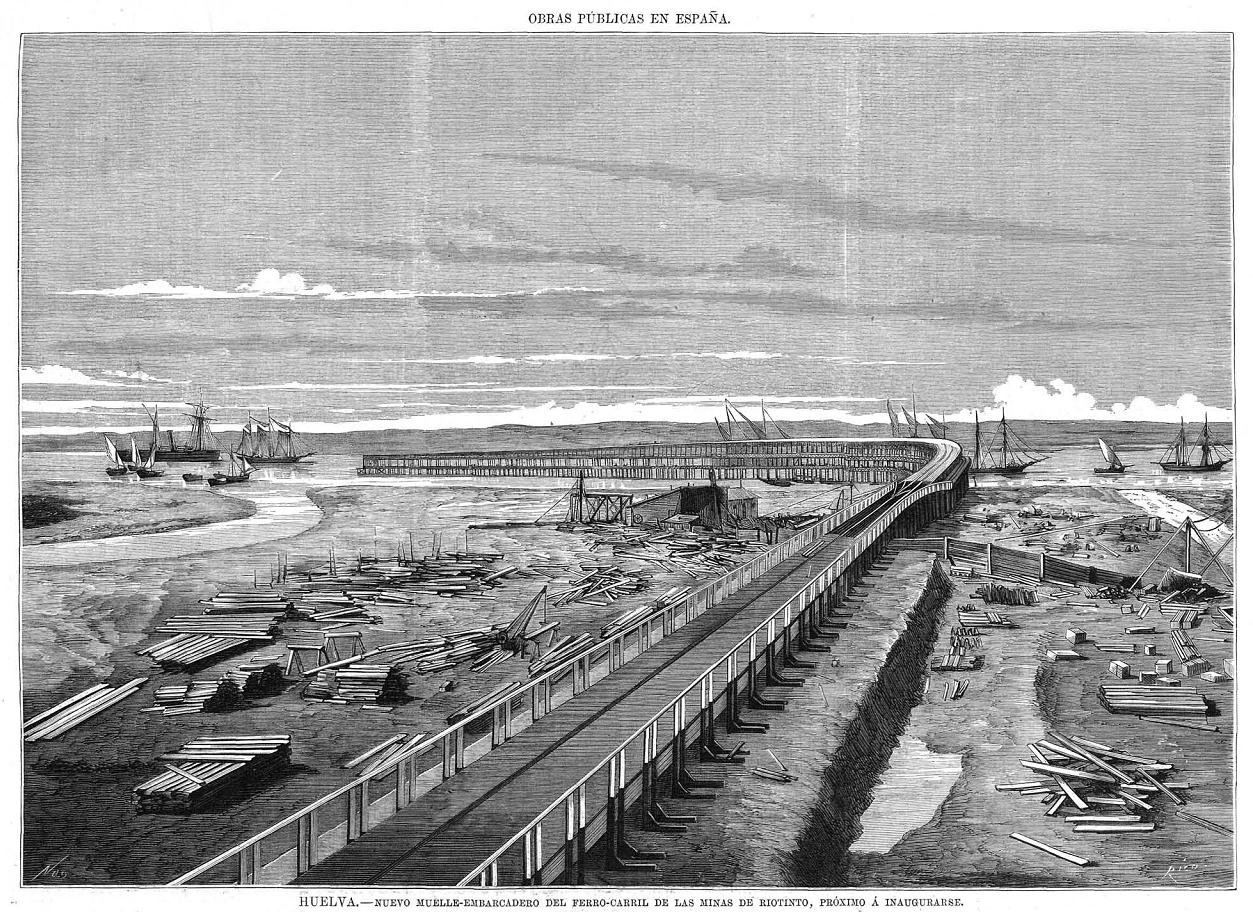
Wharf of the Minas de Riotinto railroad, in La Ilustración Española y Americana, engraving by Rico, 1876

Huelva also underwent an important development under the English influence. The numerous workshops and facilities built by the RTC that employed more than seven hundred workers, such as the railway station, changed the appearance of the city and contrasted with the rise of a new bourgeoisie of both Spaniards and foreigners who were linked to the company. The power of the company became so strong in the city that the civil buildings depended on the interests of the company. Proof of this are the Reina Victoria Neighborhood, as a garden city that housed part of its employees; the construction of the Casa Colón, which ended up becoming headquarters for company offices, the disappeared Hospital Inglés, or the huge Rio Tinto Pier located on the Odiel river.

During the early years, the railroad was built in order to provide a cheap and fast outlet for the ore. By 1875, there was already a railway line linking the mine itself with the nearest exit to the sea: the port of Huelva. Thus, most of the wealth obtained from mining — it is estimated, for instance, to be half of the world's pyrite — departed quickly across the Atlantic to England, leaving a region in apparent progress but in reality, degraded by a fierce industrialization. Despite all this, the company's profits in the province were undeniable: in little more than eighty years it generated more than 54 million pounds of profit. The landscape impact of the mines was significant, as evidenced by the three immense open-pit mines that opened up into the ground. Filón Sur in 1874, Filón Norte in 1892, and above all Corta Atalaya, in 1907, then the largest on the European continent. By 1909, RTC had a workforce of 16,973 workers at Riotinto, employing almost a third of the population of the mining basin.

The growth of mining activities in Riotinto led the company to build several industrial facilities since the late 19th century, dedicated to the processing of ore. These included a sulfuric acid factory, a metallurgical plant (Fundición Bessemer) and a classification plant (Lavadoras). Likewise, a network of auxiliary facilities was set up: warehouses, ore loading bays, workshops, a railway network and branch lines, power plants, dams and reservoirs, etc. Over time, Riotinto became an industrial center of great importance.

By the early 1900s, the Rio Tinto Company Limited was already in a strong financial position and began to invest in strategic sectors. In 1905, it founded a subsidiary, the Sociedad Española de Productos Químicos de Huelva, in charge of the production of artificial fertilizers and superphosphates. The company was based in Madrid and had a production plant in Huelva. Around 1907, the RTC signed an energy agreement with the Sociedad Minera y Metalúrgica de Peñarroya (SMMP) to supply about 19,000 tons of coal annually, relying on the railway network of the MZA. Several years later, in 1917, the SMMP and the RTC participated alongside other actors in the founding of the Sociedad Española de Construcciones Electromecánicas, a company that the Rio Tinto company supplied with significant quantities of copper for its later metallurgical treatment. Added to all this was the agreement that the RTC signed with the British Tharsis Sulphur and Copper Company Limited in 1911 whereby both companies shared customers.

=== RTC's power and influence ===
Practices carried out by the Rio Tinto Company Limited have been equated with those of a pressure group. From its early days, it made use of some deputies in the Cortes to act as intermediaries. However, from 1896, the RTC promoted the candidates of the Conservative Party for the districts of Huelva and Valverde del Camino with the idea that these, once elected deputies, would support the company in Madrid.

In Huelva province, it developed similar initiatives. For instance, in 1890 it actively supported along with Tharsis a "mining" candidacy to the Provincial Deputation formed by José María Parejo Bécquer and Vicente Ferrer Ramírez Cruzado. The joint purpose of this initiative was to get the repeal of the Albareda decree, that had prohibited open-air ore calcinations in 1888 because of the pollutants they caused. Leveraging the context that prevailed in the late 19th century, the company managed to have a net of representatives in the province that defended its interests, including names such as José María Parejo Bécquer, José Sánchez Mora or José Valero Hervás.

RTC had representation in Madrid before the administration and the government. Between 1873 and 1904, these functions were performed by Gabriel Rodríguez and his son Antonio, being succeeded from 1905 by José Valero Hervás. During the latter's period, the influence of the Rio Tinto Company in the capital was at its peak. Thanks to these "Madrid anchorages" the company was able to assume a course of action more in accordance with its own interests and to operate independently from other mining companies. Its influence within the government was considerable, reaching a close relationship with the upper spheres of Spanish politics. During the restoration, speculation was rife about the role that Rio Tinto may have had both in the ministerial appointment of Manuel de Burgos y Mazo and in the dismissal of Ángel Urzaiz — the latter, as Minister of Finance, had attempted to introduce some tariff levies on the export of iron pyrite.

The company also had its own newspaper in Huelva, La Provincia, that it controlled for some time.

=== The difficult years ===
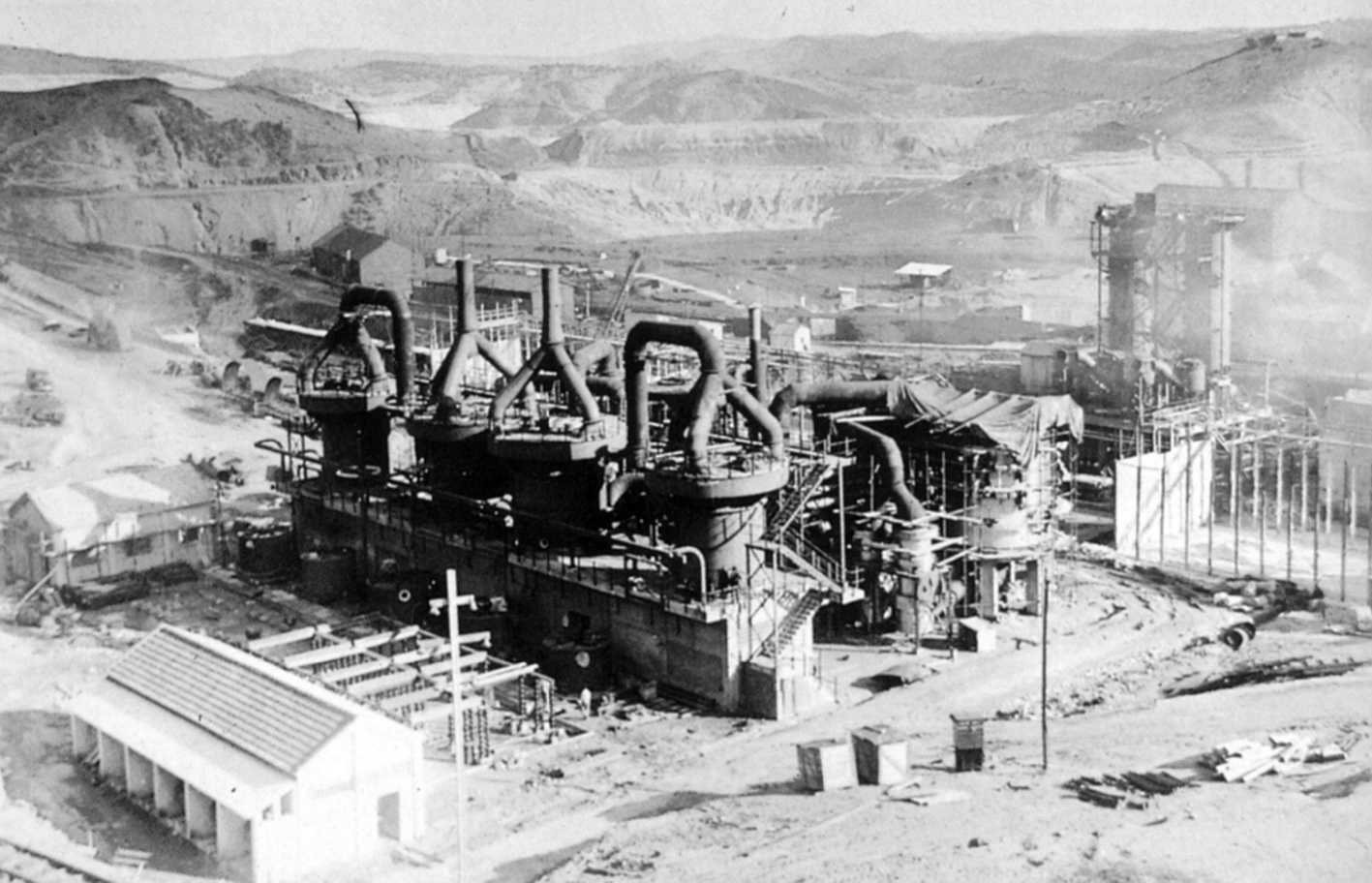
View of Fundición de Piritas

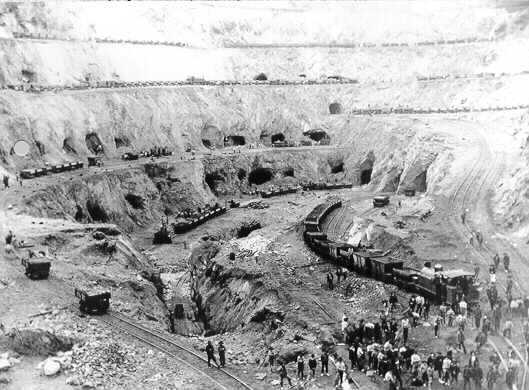
Mining works in Corta Atalaya, with the wagon track rail system

By 1917, the Rio Tinto Company Limited was one of the leading companies in Spain in terms of net assets. During this period, the company implemented a reform plan that included purchasing machinery for a greater automation of the operations and the construction of new industrial plants to treat the minerals. Up to the early 20th century, the exploitation was very profitable, but by the 1920s the situation had turned upside down. During World War I (1914–1918). the unrestricted submarine warfare conducted by Germany severely disrupted the export of pyrite to the major North American market, that until then was very dependent on the mineral coming from Spain. Added to this was that international pyrite prices plummeted with the end of the war, reducing RTC's profits. The mining strike of 1920 led to massive layoffs and damaged the company's image among the Spanish public. An additional issue, even during the Primo de Rivera dictatorship, involved paying taxes to the Spanish Treasury.

As a result of its close ties with high political spheres, the RTC was engaged in systematic tax fraud against the Spanish Treasury during its first decades of existence. In 1928 a former employee of the company who worked at Casa Colón, Harry Pilkington, denounced to the Ministry of Finance the continued fraud that the company had committed between 1923 and 1925. The chairman of the board of directors, Auckland Geddes, tried to reach a reserved agreement with the then minister, José Calvo Sotelo, but the latter rejected this possibility and preferred to take the matter through the courts.

A tough legal battle ensued, resulting in a first sentence to pay 750,000 pounds sterling in taxes based on the profits generated by its activities in Spain in 1928. The litigation lasted until 1931 and was not favorable to RTC. (Note: The Rio Tinto company disagreed with the Spanish administration and Auckland Geddes went to court. However, the court battle proved unfavorable to the interests of the RTC, which was forced to pay more than three million pounds sterling in 1931 — including taxes — in response to claims made by the government of the newly established Republic.) The Pilkington affair contributed to increase popular animosity towards the company.

In 1929, ore extraction at Riotinto reached its historical maximum. The company made several investments in order to modernize its network of facilities, such as the railroad or the pier in Huelva, or to build new ones. However, in that same year also began a severe economic crisis that would eventually affect the business. From 1931 onwards, the mining basin went through a period of great labor and social conflict. The outbreak of the Civil War, in 1936, caused new difficulties for the company. From very early on, the Nationalist forces imposed embargoes on the production of pyrites or diverted exports to ports in Axis countries, especially to Nazi Germany. The German company Hisma-Rowak channeled the ore shipments. The new situation did not affect exports to the United Kingdom, but it did with France, which between 1936 and 1939 lost virtually all shipments of Riotinto pyrite.

The measures imposed by Francoist authorities caused relations between the company and the administration to grow strained. Starting in 1940, the regime adopted a more interventionist line of action, initiating serious harassment towards the company. Falange came to describe the company as a "colonizer", while the dictator Francisco Franco called the Riotinto mines "an economic Gibraltar of Spain". From some scopes, the idea of nationalizing the sites began to be openly promoted. This coincided in time with the outbreak of World War II, which severely affected RTC's traditional markets to the point that by 1941 its turnover had fallen by about 53%. Faced with the prevailing situation, the company adopted a strategy of minimizing its activities at Riotinto, also imposing a restriction on expenses and dividend distribution among shareholders.

=== Internationalization ===
From the 1920s, the Rio Tinto Company Limited began a policy of diversification of its investments and activities, acquiring several mines in British colonies in Africa. Around 1928, it was already investing heavily in sites located in Northern Rhodesia. Spain slowly lost the prominent position it once held within the company since 1873. The proclamation of the Second Spanish Republic, in 1931, was not welcomed by the management of RTC due to fears of an expropriation of the Riotinto mines. Throughout World War II, difficulties faced by the company led to various discussions regarding the sale of the mines to Spanish capitalists, although this possibility did not happen. After 1946, with the rise in the international price of copper, the exploitation of the Huelva sites began to yield profits again.

In the early 1950s, in a much more stable context, the old idea of selling the mines was taken up again. In June 1954, the negotiations that would lead to the sale of the RTC properties in Huelva to a group of financial institutions began: the Banco Español de Crédito, the Banco Hispano Americano and the Banco de España. The operation was approved by Franco on August 14 and cost £7.66 million (about 1000 million pesetas at the time). Two-thirds of the assets passed into the hands of Spanish private capital, although RTC would keep the remaining third. On October 28 of the same year, the Compañía Española de las Minas de Río Tinto (CEMRT) was incorporated, assuming ownership of the sites and facilities.

For the RTC, the fact of divesting its Spanish assets was not frowned upon, given that the Riotinto operations were already beginning to show signs of depletion. Moreover, the British company was the majority shareholder in the company, where it controlled 33% of its capital. With the capital obtained from the sale, the company made investments in Australia, Canada and the United States, where it would exploit uranium and oil deposits. This expansion of its business, in addition to the mines it already operated in Africa, consolidated the diversification strategy that RTC had been undertaking for several decades. In 1962, the Rio Tinto Company Limited agreed to merge with Consolidated Zinc, giving rise to the Rio Tinto-Zinc Corporation. Concurrently, the Australian assets of the two companies were merged to form another company, Conzinc Riotinto of Australia.

== Social and labor conflicts ==
=== Las teleras ===
As the demonstrators, more than 12,000 in number, were huddled in the narrow adjacent streets and square with greater joy and confidence, the cavalry was ordered to withdraw from the place it occupied and immediately afterward a closed, immense discharge — with projectiles sweeping that human mass — sent the crowd in disorderly retreat, leaving many corpses and injured on the ground and ran through the streets shouting cries of terror and violent rage. Who gave the order to fire? So far it is not known. Was it the Governor? Was it the Military Chief? The unconscious soldiery, the stupid machine that obeys and kills, the soldier who directs the muzzle of the rifle to the town from where he left and to where he will return, enjoyed the sight of gunpowder and blood. With the testimony of hundreds of people who witnessed the event, we can affirm that the demonstrators did not utter a single subversive shout, nor did they utter a provocation or an act that would disturb the troops or the Authorities. —"The events of Rio Tinto". Diario la Coalición Republicana, 1888.

On February 4, 1888, shortly after the arrival of the new general manager Mr. William Rich, a demonstration of miners and farmers protesting against the fumes of the ''teleras'' and the poor working conditions was harshly repressed by the army. While the central government and the company hushed up part of the event, it is believed that more than two hundred people were killed that day. The events were known in the province of Huelva as "El año de los tiros" ("The year of the shots").

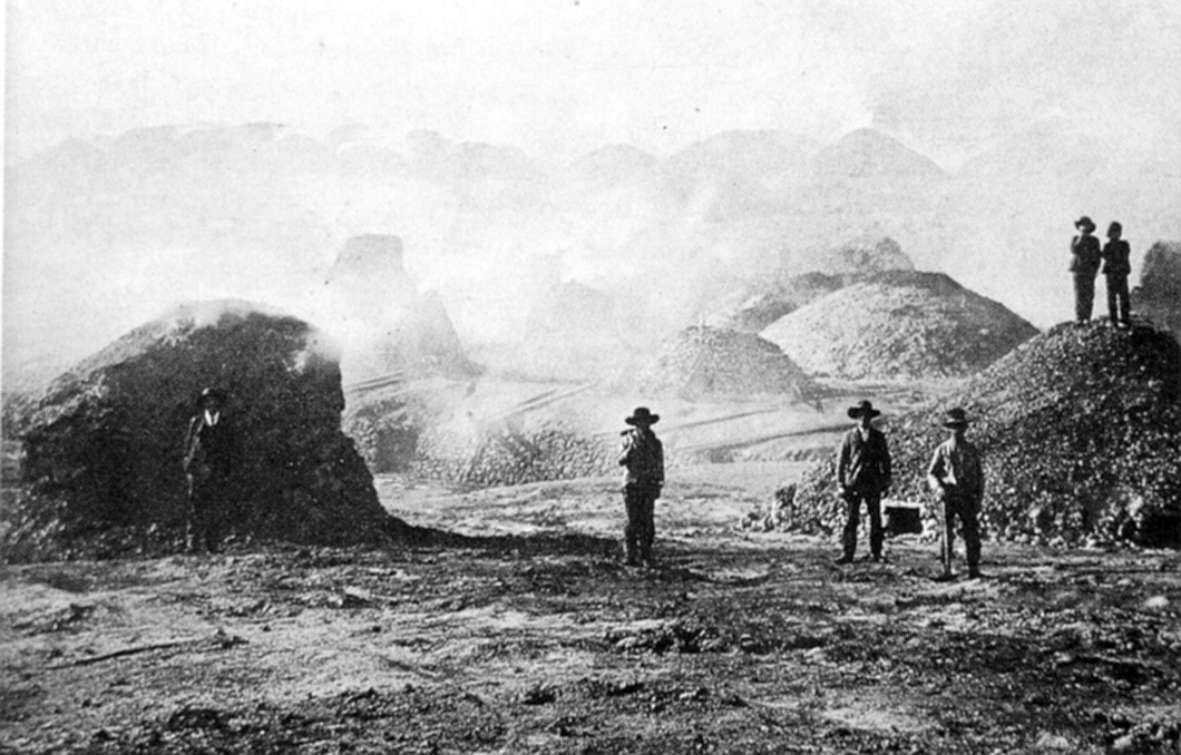
Teleras

The teleras (open-air calcination of low copper ore imposed in Spain by Gaspar de Remisa, 1st Marquess of Remisa decades before) were used in the area since the beginning of the century, but with the arrival of the English their use increased considerably and it is estimated that around 500 tons per year were released into the air. This had a certain national resonance, and the population in the province was divided between humistas ("pro-smoke") who defended their use as a symbol of progress and antihumistas ("anti-smoke") who condemned them for their extremely high polluting effect (in fact, the fumes from the teleras flooded the entire region and were sometimes visible in the mountains of Seville and even Ayamonte and Portugal). Thus, since 1877, the first complaints regarding this matter were made to the Government of Cánovas del Castillo. As a result, a Resolution was published on July 22, 1879, which, even though it imposed small indemnities for the damage caused to the crops in the area, did not raise concerns about people's health. That is to say, to a certain extent, it "legalized" the use of the calcinations regardless of several deaths of workers in the area caused by them — deaths that the company's doctors attributed to congenital diseases of the workers and not externally caused ("lack of life" according to their own reports) and, of course, not the result of the mines.

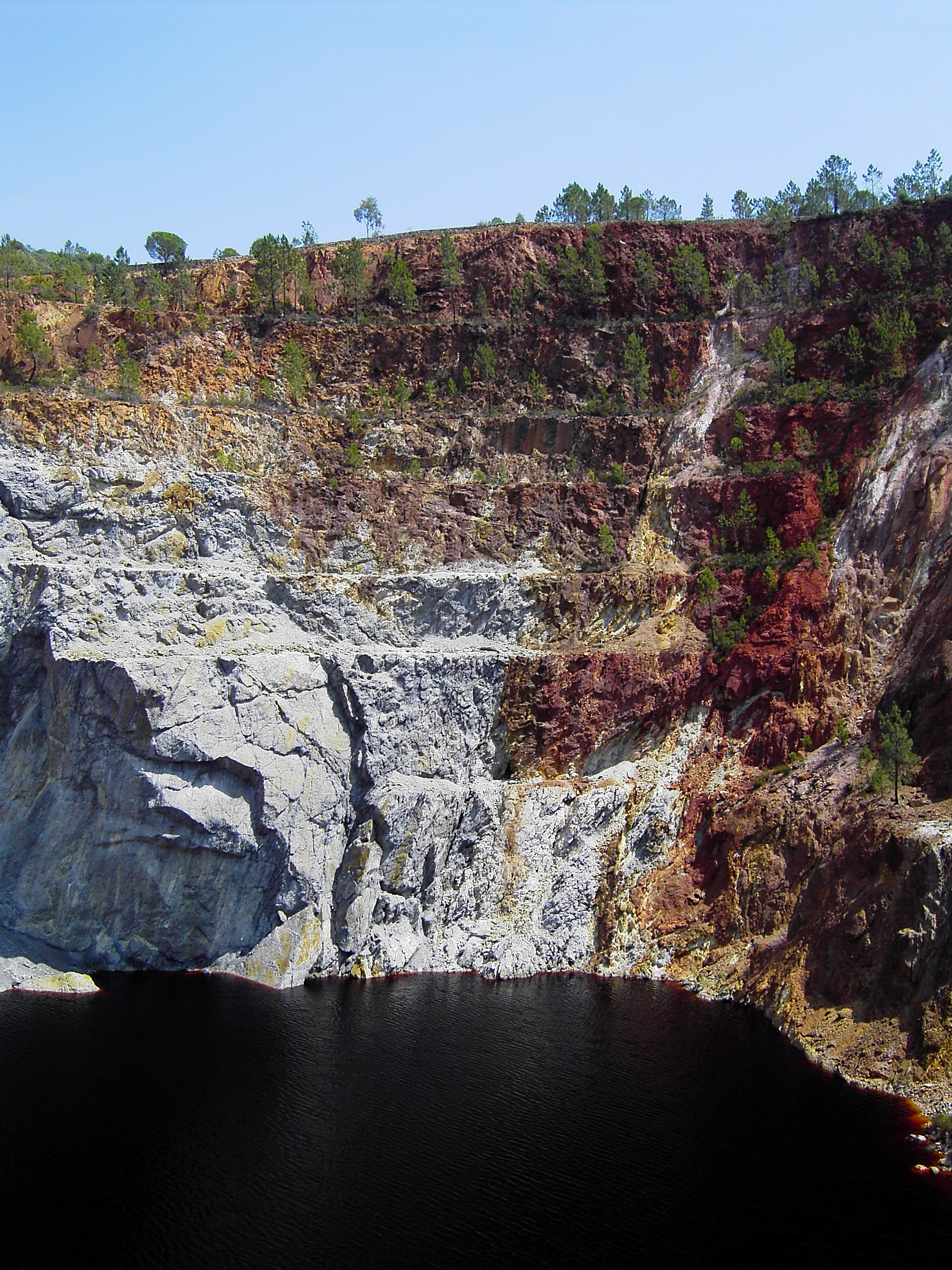
Corta de Peña del Hierro, in Nerva

Meanwhile, the town councils tried to prohibit these procedures. But the government, influenced by the company and conservative newspapers such as La Provincia (which had carried out an almost crusade in favor of mining) systematically repealed all municipal laws against the teleras.

The degree of discontent with the situation was such that landowners and day laborers, who saw how their crops and traditional livelihoods were being lost and contaminated without remission, joined the labor and "environmental" protests of the miners. Thus, on January 31, 1888, a demonstration led by the Cuban trade unionist Maximiliano Tornet arrived at the town's town hall to deliver a series of demands, among them the disappearance of open-air calcination. It was not until December 29 of the same year that the Government decreed that this type of calcination (already banned in Great Britain seven years earlier) should be reduced.

Starting on February 2, a strike began in the Cuenca Minera that provoked the Civil Governor to station two companies of the General Pavía Regiment in Huelva, commanded by Lieutenant Colonel Ulpiano Sánchez. The following day, in spite of the mediation attempts of the Civil Guard, violent attempts take place, the City Council and the manager of the William Rich Company do not accept any of the conditions and probably alert the capital to transfer the army companies to Riotinto. The morning of February 4, a new demonstration took place with the arrival of people from the nearby town of Nerva and neighboring areas, and a delegation even went up to the Town Hall to present their claims. The town's Plaza de la Constitución is full of workers, women and children, and it is estimated that there were more than twelve thousand people from all over the region. When leaving the building the Pavia forces charge for fifteen minutes with shots and bayonets against the demonstrators resulting in a number of fatalities and wounded not officially known — ranging between 14 and 45 in the press and depending on whether it was the conservative or liberal media and today is estimated much wider.

Where the bodies of the deceased were buried remains unknown, but it is presumed that they were buried under slag in one of the mines in the area. The tragedy, which caused national and even international commotion, can be considered as one of the first environmental demonstrations. Despite all this, the teleras were not banned in Spain until years later, because even though that same year a Royal Decree was issued by Minister José Luis Albareda which urged its disappearance, it was not until 1907 when this method of calcination disappeared, being replaced by the construction of small smelters.

=== The 1913 and 1920 strikes ===
Less known but also proof of the less poor system of management of the company were the strike of 1913, between October 5 and November 18, affecting all of the company's facilities. While mining operations were suspended, a fire broke out on November 2 inside the main shaft, known as Alicia. As the mines were inactive, no workers were underground at the time. However, the mine director's hasty and improvised orders to investigate the cause of the accident resulted in the deaths of five British technicians and two Spanish workers. With the strike of 1920. with a duration of six months, the workers once again demanded rights that were held by colleagues in other Spanish mining districts. During this strike, the workers' children had to be taken in by other workers' families from Andalusia because they could no longer be fed at home due to the lack of wages and aid.

== Anglo-Saxon culture ==
The large English-speaking population settled in the area — mostly workers and managers of the Rio Tinto Company — allowed part of their cultural, social and sporting traditions to be implanted in the mining basin and even in the rest of the country:

- Though the English played different sports, it was "foot-ball" (soccer, or fútbol once Spanishized) the game that became better established in the area. Proof of this can be noted in that Riotinto was home to the first soccer teams in the country and the creation of the first soccer club in the capital in 1889: the "Recreation Club" or Real Club Recreativo de Huelva.
- Creation of the first groups of scouts in the locality of Riotinto, by Frank Timmis (d. 1931), president of the Local Council, English national and great connoisseur of the work of Baden-Powell. In 1924, the High Patronage of Exploradores in Minas de Riotinto, dependent on the Department of Schools of the RTCL, left the organization in the hands of Timmis and soon they had about 300 members among students where they were taught scouting principles.
- Some families were used to having the British five o'clock tea.
- Social projects for the workers, such as schools, hospitals in Riotinto and Huelva and the creation of Huelva's Seamen's Institute to help seamen.

== Organization ==
The company had its headquarters at number 3 Lombard Street in London, with a representative office at number 8, Calle de Ventura de la Vega in Madrid. Its administrative offices were located in the Huelva municipality of Minas de Riotinto. During the early 1930s, the Riotinto offices were located in the Casa de Dirección. Within the business organization, the managers, technicians and engineers of the RTC were of British origin, while the rest of the staff was composed of employees of native origin.

In Spain, the company's structure was divided into "departments" that were in charge of different areas: personnel, management, subsidiaries, workshops, railroads, mineral exports, etc. For many years RTC's main facilities were located within the territory of the Riotinto-Nerva mining basin and in the city of Huelva, although starting in the 1920s, the company began to own mines in North America and Africa. Besides the mining sites, it also controlled industrial plants, auxiliary facilities, warehouses, offices, houses and guest houses, country estates, etc. Within Spanish territory, it owned a railway network with a total length of 360 kilometers, including the main track, branch lines and various secondary tracks.

=== Presidents of the RTC ===
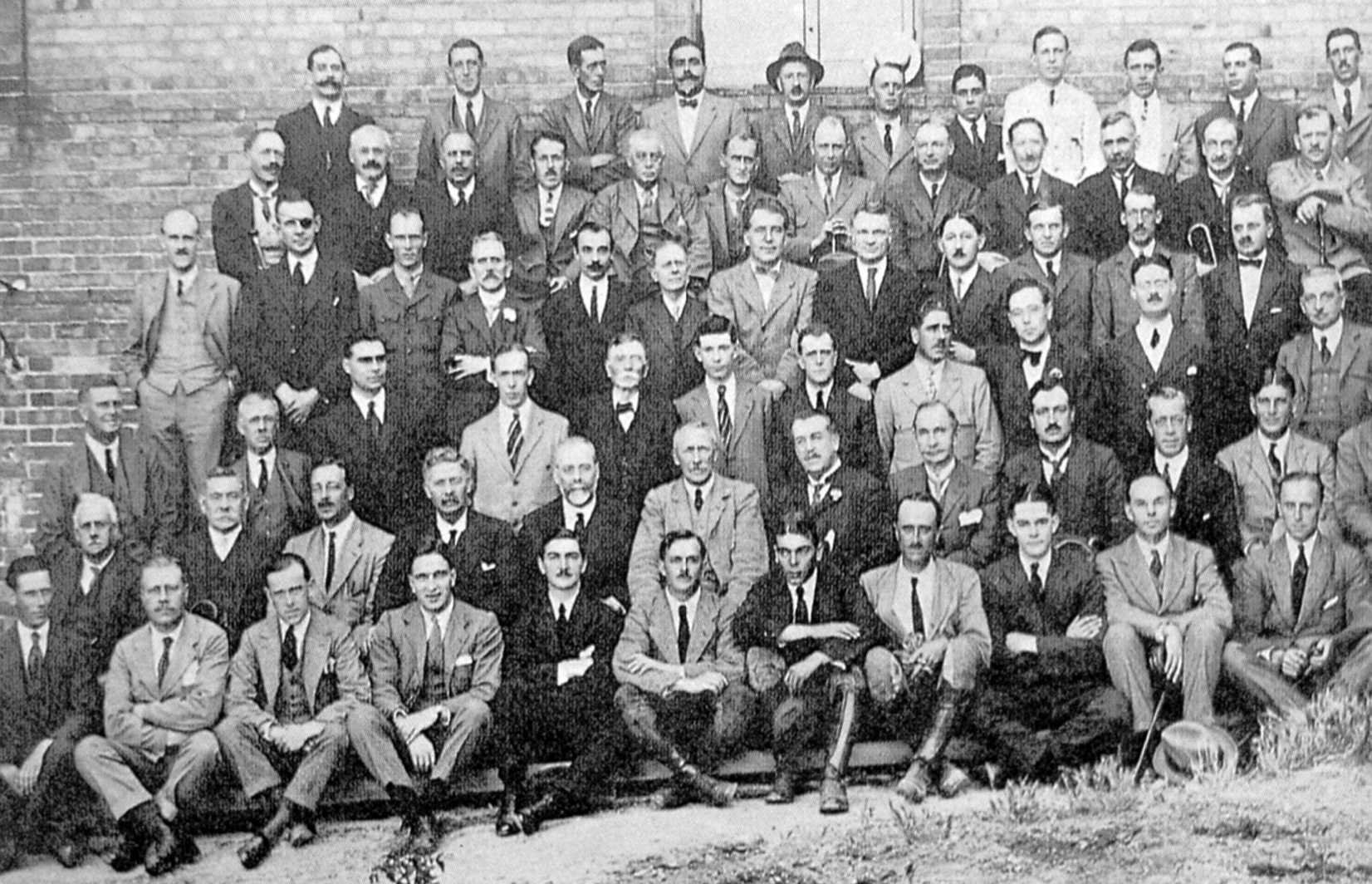
RTC executives and engineers at Minas de Riotinto, c. 1930

| Name | Period |
|---|---|
| Hugh Matheson | 1873–1898 |
| John J.J. Keswick | 1898–1904 |
| Charles W. Fielding | 1904-1923 |
| Albert Milner | 1923–1925 |
| Auckland Geddes | 1925–1947 |
| Vere Ponsonby | 1947–1954 |

== Archival holdings ==
Part of the documentary holdings of the former company are located in Spain, stored in the Archivo Histórico Minero of the Río Tinto Foundation. They are grouped in the subgroup "Minas de Riotinto" and the classification table corresponds to the different departments of the company that produced the documentation: Personnel, Accounting, Management, Labor, Railroad, Medical Department, Topography, etc. Apart from the material preserved in Spanish territory, another part of the archives of the historical company is in the custody of the Rio Tinto plc in London.

== See also ==
- Unión Explosivos Río Tinto
- United Alkali Company
- Rio Tinto massacre
- Tharsis-La Zarza mining basin
- Peña del Hierro mine

== Bibliography ==
- Arenas Posadas, Carlos (2017). "Riotinto, el declive de un mito minero (1954-2003)". Revista de Historia Industrial (in Spanish) (69). Barcelona: Universidad de Barcelona: 109–142. ISSN 1132-7200.
- Avery, David (1974). Not on Queen Victoria's birthday: the story of the Rio Tinto mines. London: Collins.
- Carreras, Alber; Tafunell, Xavier (2005) [1989]. Estadísticas históricas de España: siglos XIX-XX. Vol. I. Fundación BBVA.
- Cobos Wilkins, Juan (2005). La Huelva británica. Sevilla: Fundación José Manuel Lara.
- Dick, Howard; Merrett, David (2007). The Internationalisation Strategies of Small-country Firms. The Australian Experience of Globalisation. Cheltenham: Edward Elgar.
- Domínguez, Consuelo (2019). Hugh M. Matheson: un victoriano en las minas de Rio Tinto. Universidad de Huelva.
- Ferrero Blanco, María Dolores (2000). Un modelo de minería contemporánea: Huelva, del colonialismo a la mundialización (in Spanish). Universidad de Huelva.
- Ferrero Blanco, María Dolores (2017) [2006]. Capitalismo minero y resistencia rural en el suroeste andaluz. Riotinto, 1873-1900. Huelva: Universidad de Huelva. ISBN 978-84-17066-10-9.
- Flores Caballero, Manuel (2007). Los Rothschild y la venta de las minas de Río Tinto en el proceso de la Ley General de Desamortización de Madoz. Servicio de pub. de la Universidad de Huelva. ISBN 978-84-16872-72-5.
- Flores Caballero, Manuel (2011). Las fuerzas de la revolución industrial en la fiebre minera del XIX. Editorial Fundación para la investigación Juan Manuel Flores Jimeno. ISBN 978-84-937687-8-2.
- Flores Caballero, Manuel (2017). La nacionalización de las minas de Río Tinto y la formación de la compañía española (in Spanish). Huelva: Servicio de publicaciones de la Universidad de Huelva. ISBN 9788493768744.
- García Ruiz, Manuel Ángel; Manera, Carles (2006). Historia empresarial de España. Un enfoque regional en profundidad. Lid Editorial Empresarial.
- Garrido, Ramón; Carvajal, Domingo Javier (2017). "Notas sobre el patrimonio minero del sur de la provincia de Huelva". Patrimonio geológico y minero: Una apuesta por el desarrollo local sostenible. At: Emilio Romero Macías (dir.). Universidad de Huelva. pp. 359–371.
- Gómez Mendoza, Antonio (1994). El "Gibraltar económico": Franco y Riotinto, 1936-1954. Madrid: Río Tinto Minera.
- Harvey, Charles E. (1981). The Rio Tinto Company. An economic history of a leading international mining 1873-1954 (in Spanish). Alison Hodge.
- Kutney, Gerald (2007). Sulfur: History, Technology, Applications & Industry. Elsevier Science Limited. ISBN 978-1-895198-37-9.
- Jones, Geoffrey (2005). Multinationals and Global Capitalism: From the Nineteenth to the Twenty-first Century. Oxford University Press.
- León Vela, José; Martínez Roldán, Nieves (2001). La reconversión de áreas industriales obsoletas. Vol. I. Universidad de Sevilla. ISBN 978-84-472-0670-4.
- López-Morell, Miguel Ángel (2005). La Casa Rothschild en España (1812-1941). Madrid: Marcial Pons. ISBN 84-95379-84-8.
- Mojarro Bayo, Ana María (2010). La historia del puerto de Huelva (1873-1930). Servicio de publicaciones de la Universidad de Huelva/Puerto de Huelva.
- Ortiz Mateo, Miguel (2005). Explotación de las Minas de Río Tinto por la Real Hacienda (1783-1829). De Re Metallica. Madrid: Sociedad Española para la Defensa del Patrimonio Geológico y Minero. pp. 65–74. ISSN 1888-8615.
- Peña Guerrero, María Antonia (2017). Clientelismo político y poderes periféricos durante la Restauración Huelva (1874-1923). Universidad de Huelva. ISBN 9788417066000.
- Pérez López, Juan Manuel (2006a). "Ferrocarriles y minas: los sectores de inversión de los capitales extranjeros". Los ferrocarriles en la provincia de Huelva: Un recorrido por el pasado. En: Emilio Romero Macías (dir.). Huelva: Servicio de publicaciones de la Universidad de Huelva. pp. 159–176.
- Pérez López, Juan Manuel (2006b). "El ferrocarril minero de Riotinto". Los ferrocarriles en la provincia de Huelva: Un recorrido por el pasado. En: Emilio Romero Macías (dir.). Huelva: Servicio de publicaciones de la Universidad de Huelva. pp. 229–272.
- Pérez López, Juan Manuel (2009). El Archivo Histórico Minero de Fundación Río Tinto como ejemplo de archivo del mundo del trabajo (PDF). Arch-e. Revista Andaluza de Archivos. Junta de Andalucía. Consejería de Cultura y Patrimonio Histórico. pp. 64–93. ISSN 1989-5577.
- Pérez Macías, Juan Aurelio; Delgado, Aquilino (2007). "La metalla de Riotinto en época julio-claudia". In Juan Aurelio Pérez Macías; Aquilino Delgado Domínguez (eds.). Las minas de Riotinto en época julio-claudia. Universidad de Huelva. pp. 37–184.
- Romero Macías, Emilio M. (2006). Los Ferrocarriles en la provincia de Huelva: Un recorrido por el pasado (in Spanish). Universidad de Huelva. ISBN 978-84-16061-73-0.

== Additional bibliography ==
- G, Lola (25 March 2007). "Los muertos sin nombre de Riotinto". El País (in Spanish).
