= William Alexander Mackay =

- Born: 10 July 1860; Latheron, Caithness, Scotland
- Died: 14 July 1927 (aged 67); Heathmouth, Ross-shire, Scotland
- Resting place: Logie Easter Cemetery, Ross and Cromarty, Scotland
- Education: MD 1889
- Alma mater: University of Edinburgh
- Occupation: Doctor
- Known for: Co-founder of Spanish football club Recreativo de Huelva

William Alexander Mackay (10 July 1860 – 14 July 1927) was a Scottish medical doctor who worked for the Rio Tinto mining company and co-founded Spain's oldest football club, Recreativo de Huelva.

== Early life ==
William Mackay was born in Latheron, Caithness, on 10 July 1860, the son of Anglican priest Reverend John Mackay and Wilhelmina Sutherland. He graduated from the University of Edinburgh with a medical degree in 1882.

== Medical career ==
In 1883 William Mackay began practicing as a doctor for the Rio Tinto mining company in Minas de Riotinto Huelva, Andalusia, Spain. His brother, John Sutherland Mackay, was the company's chief medical officer and the president of the company's football team. In 1883 medical provision for Rio Tinto staff was limited to that provided by the Spanish Provincial Hospital. William inspected the Spanish Provincial Hospital in 1883 and reported to the Board of the Rio Tinto Company that the hospital was insanitary and crowded: "Small windows, placed near the roof, and clammy walls, complete the picture of a medieval prison". The Rio Tinto Company subsequently built the English Hospital in 1884 solely for the use of their employees. William Mackay was responsible for the plan and construction of the English Hospital. In addition to Rio Tinto employees, William tended to the local poor for free on Thursdays. William's experiences of working as a doctor at the hospital, and in private practice, formed the basis of the MD thesis he submitted to the University of Edinburgh in 1889 with the title Surgery in Spain.

== Footballing career ==
In June 1884, inspired by the company's football team, Río Tinto FC, Mackay created the Sociedad de Juego de Pelota (Spanish: Ball Game Society), which organized football games along with other typical British sports. He was soon joined in his work by another young doctor, Robert Russell Ross, and the two of them kept organizing football games between the miners and in 1888, they even began to organize matches against crews of English ships who docked in the port of Huelva, ranging from sailors to captains through officers. This entity became known in Huelva as Recreo de Huelva.

On 1 March 1888, Dr. Mackay sent a letter to Dr. Ildefonso Mártinez to invite the Spanish doctor to join Club de Recreo in order to play football and cricket games against the mariners of a merchant ship called Jane Cory, but most important than the invitation was its historical significance, as it made the first reference to a Recreation Club.

Mackay and Ross founded a sports club for Rio Tinto Company workers, which was originally named Huelva Recreation Club and it was originally intended to provide physical recreation for the Rio Tinto mineworkers in order to improve their health. It was officially established as Recreativo de Huelva on 23 December 1889. Although the club is now known as Spain's oldest football club, their activities were not originally restricted to football: Mackay invited Ildefenso Martinez to play cricket in 1888 and the club organized rugby matches in 1910. In 1896, Mackay became the club's second-ever president, replacing Charles Wilson Adam, and he held this position for nearly three decades until 1924, except for a brief period in 1903, in which the club was opening up to more Spanish players, and likewise, in 1906, Manuel Pérez de Guzmán became vice-president with four of his sons playing for the club.

== Personal life ==
William Mackay's wife and their four children all died of a hereditary disease within six years of each other, between 1896 and 1902. His son Alexander died in 1896, his wife Catherine and son Juanito in 1898, and his daughters Anita and Molly in 1902.

William Mackay was named an adopted son of the city of Huelva in 1923, and the street he lived in was named after him. On receiving this honour, he said:

"The greatest sadness of my life I have suffered in Huelva, and here I have enjoyed the greatest happiness, too."

== Death ==
William Mackay returned to Scotland in 1924 and died at Heathmouth, Ross-shire, on 14 July 1927 at the age of 67. He is buried at Logie Easter Cemetery.

== In Literature ==
In "The Arches of the Years," Dr. Halliday Sutherland (his nephew) described him as "a tall, red-haired Scotsman, with blue eyes and a red moustache. He was a good surgeon, a good shot, a good rider and a good cricketer. Having pleasant manners, he got on well with the Spaniards." The book also described the work of the clinic.
