= Rafael Benjumea Cabeza de Vaca =

Spanish aristocrat (1939–2021)

Rafael Benjumea y Cabeza de Vaca (29 January 1939 – 7 April 2021), Marquis of Valdecañas, Count of Peñón de la Vega & Count of Guadalhorce was a Spanish aristocrat and engineer. He was also president of the Duques de Soria Foundation.

== Biography ==
He was the son of Francisco Benjumea y Heredia (1908–1995), 3rd Count of Guadalhorce, and his wife Matilde Cabeza de Vaca y Garret (1915–2006), XVI Marquise of Valdecañas, Marquise of Torremayor, XVI Countess of Peñón de la Vega. He was the second of ten brothers and sisters. He received his doctorate in the Higher Technical School of Mining Engineers (Polytechnic University of Madrid). Subsequently, by means of a Fulbright scholarship completed a master's degree in Civil Engineering at the University of Michigan.

In 1974 he married his cousin Blanca Benjumea Llorente. The couple had six children: Blanca, Rafael, José, Tilda, Enrique and Isabel.

On March 1, 1989, the Duques de Soria Foundation was established. Since then and until his death, Benjumea assumed the presidency of his board of trustees, and promoted Spanish-US relations in various scientific disciplines (architecture, medicine, economy, conservation of the heritage, among others). He also created the Permanent Observatory of Hispanism in 2019, to unite synergies around the values of the Hispanism.

He was one of the creators of the Rio Tinto Foundation Board for the History of Mining and Metallurgy, being vice president (1987–2002), and, later, president (2002–2021). He was also CEO of Ertisa and Río Tinto Minera; president of Asturiana de Zinc and Unión Naval de Levante; general director of the Botín Foundation; vice president of the ANAR Foundation (Aid to Children and Adolescents at Risk); vice president and president of the Advisory Board of British Telecom Spain; president of the Board of Trustees of FEC (Catholic Education Foundation); president of the Advisory Board of Fotowatio and the IE University.

He died in his residence in Madrid, on April 7, 2021, due to heart failure. He was buried in the cemetery of Trujillo, Cáceres.
