= Río Tinto Minera =

Former Spanish mining company

Río Tinto Minera (RTM)
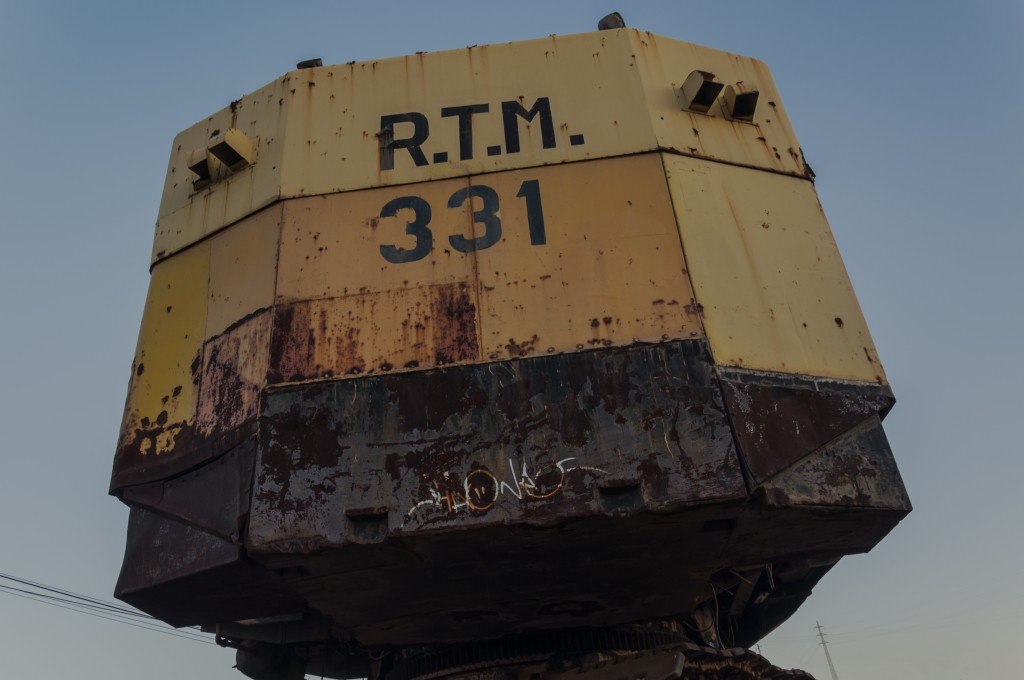
- Formation: 1978
- Dissolved: 1995
- Type: S.A.
- Purpose: Mining, metallurgy
- Headquarters: Huelva, Minas de Riotinto

Río Tinto Minera (RTM) was a Spanish company in the mining and industrial sector, whose activity was centred on the Riotinto-Nerva mining basin. Originally a subsidiary of the Explosivos Río Tinto (ERT) group, the company was active between 1978 and 1995, going through various economic difficulties. RTM ended up ceasing its operations due to its heavy debt and the crisis that the mining industry was going through in those years.

== History ==
=== Creation and early days ===
The company was created in June 1978 as the successor to Río Tinto Patiño, following the departure of the Patiño group from its shareholding years earlier. Initially, RTM was 75% owned by the Spanish group Unión Explosivos Río Tinto (ERT) and 25% by the British Rio Tinto-Zinc Corporation (RTZ), although the latter increased its shareholding to 49% during the period 1979-1980. RTZ was the heir to the historic Rio Tinto Company Limited, which had controlled the Rio Tinto mine complex between 1873 and 1954. With the creation of Rio Tinto Minera, the ERT group brought all the business lines in the mining basin (copper, gold, silver and pyrites) under the same management. Finding that the business was not producing the desired results, the company's management adopted an expansion strategy that included new exploration plans for the following years, a modernisation of the equipment used and an expansion of the mining work in the deposits. RTM's plants in the Rio Tinto basin and in the Chemical Park of Huelva were also expanded.

Rio Tinto Minera, which controlled 27% of SECEM's capital, was one of the actors involved in the formation of the Ibercobre conglomerate in 1978 with the aim of concentrating the Spanish copper industry under a single holding company. In addition, from 1981 it started up the kaolinite deposit at Vimianzo (A Coruña) through the subsidiary Caolines de Vimianzo (CAVISA), which was 80% owned by Río Tinto Minera. Between 1980 and 1981 RTM also exploited the gossan present in the voids of the San Miguel mine, in the province of Huelva.

=== Final stage ===
However, the expansion strategy undertaken by Río Tinto Minera ended up being a failure. During the 1980s, RTM's economic situation was not good due to the crisis that mining was going through in those years, with frequent negative balances in the company's accounts. The debt contracted with the banks also grew exponentially, which compromised the future strategies of the mining subsidiary of the ERT group. Another adversity that RTM had to face was the significant drop in the price of copper on the international markets during those years, so that the copper business line in Riotinto became a real "money sink". As a result, between 1977 and 1986 the accumulated losses exceeded 12,000 million pesetas. The ERT group adopted a policy of cost restraint which led to the closure of the century-old Riotinto railway (1984) and the copper production line (1987).

Despite the economic difficulties, Rio Tinto Minera continued to hold an important position. By 1987, it was the second largest pyrites seller in Spain, with a 38.1% share of the national market. At that time it diversified its business through various business initiatives. In 1988 it built a copper wire drawing plant in Lliçà de Vall (Barcelona) and two years later, in 1990, it acquired from the Finnish company Outokumpu the continuous casting plant for wire rod that the Ibercobre group had built in the historic SECEM complex in Córdoba.

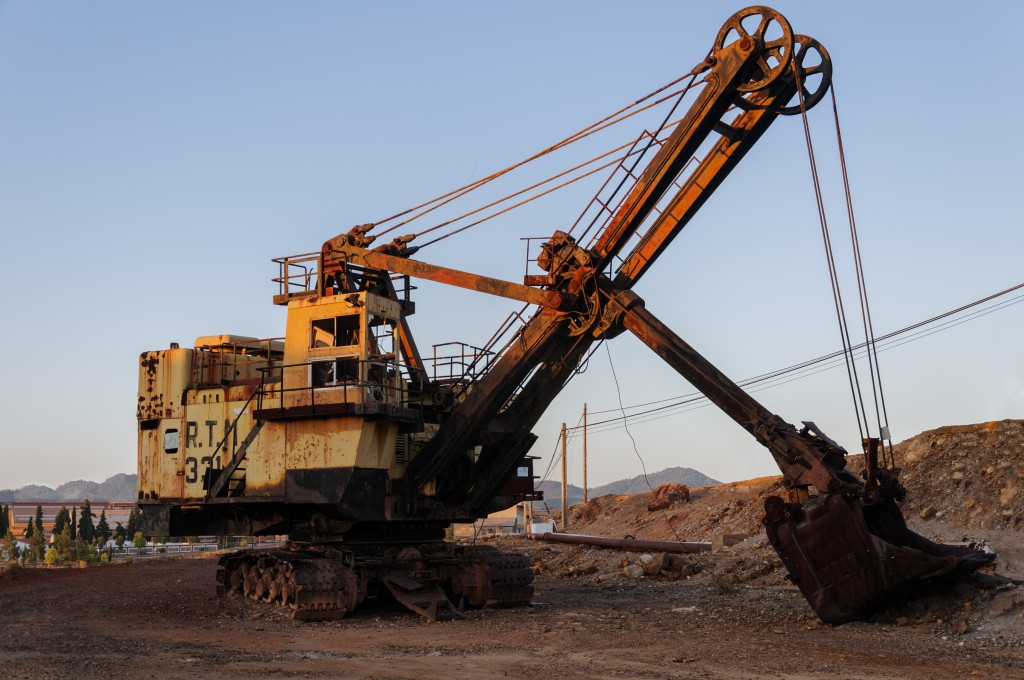
Former excavator no. 331 used at Cerro Colorado.

In 1989, RTM passed into the hands of Ercros, along with the rest of the companies of the former ERT group. This situation did not last long, as Ercros sold its stake in Rio Tinto Minera to the US company Freeport-McMoRan in 1993, shortly after having declared suspension of payments. Freeport-McMoRan proceeded to break up the business into new companies: while Rio Tinto Minera continued to operate the Rio Tinto deposits, the Huelva smelter was left to Río Tinto Metal. By that time, Corta Atalaya had ceased to operate and only Cerro Colorado remained in operation. Faced with the situation of constant deficits generated by the Rio Tinto operation, the new owner drew up a viability plan for the business which it presented to the workers.

The so-called Arbor Plan envisaged the gradual extinction of mining activities in Riotinto until its total cessation in 1996. The workers' representatives rejected this proposal and proposed the reopening of copper mining. Negotiations between the two parties were not fruitful, so in 1995 Freerport sold its assets in the Riotinto mining basin to the RTM workers, who became a labour corporation. (Note: For 1 peseta each of the 670,000 shares in Rio Tinto Minera were sold by the US company to the 520 RTM workers, who gained control of the entire site. In exchange for this sale, Freerport was relieved of these loss-making assets and of having to assume environmental liabilities for the aggressive mining activities of the past (Arenas Posadas, 2017, p. 135).)

== Cultural initiatives ==
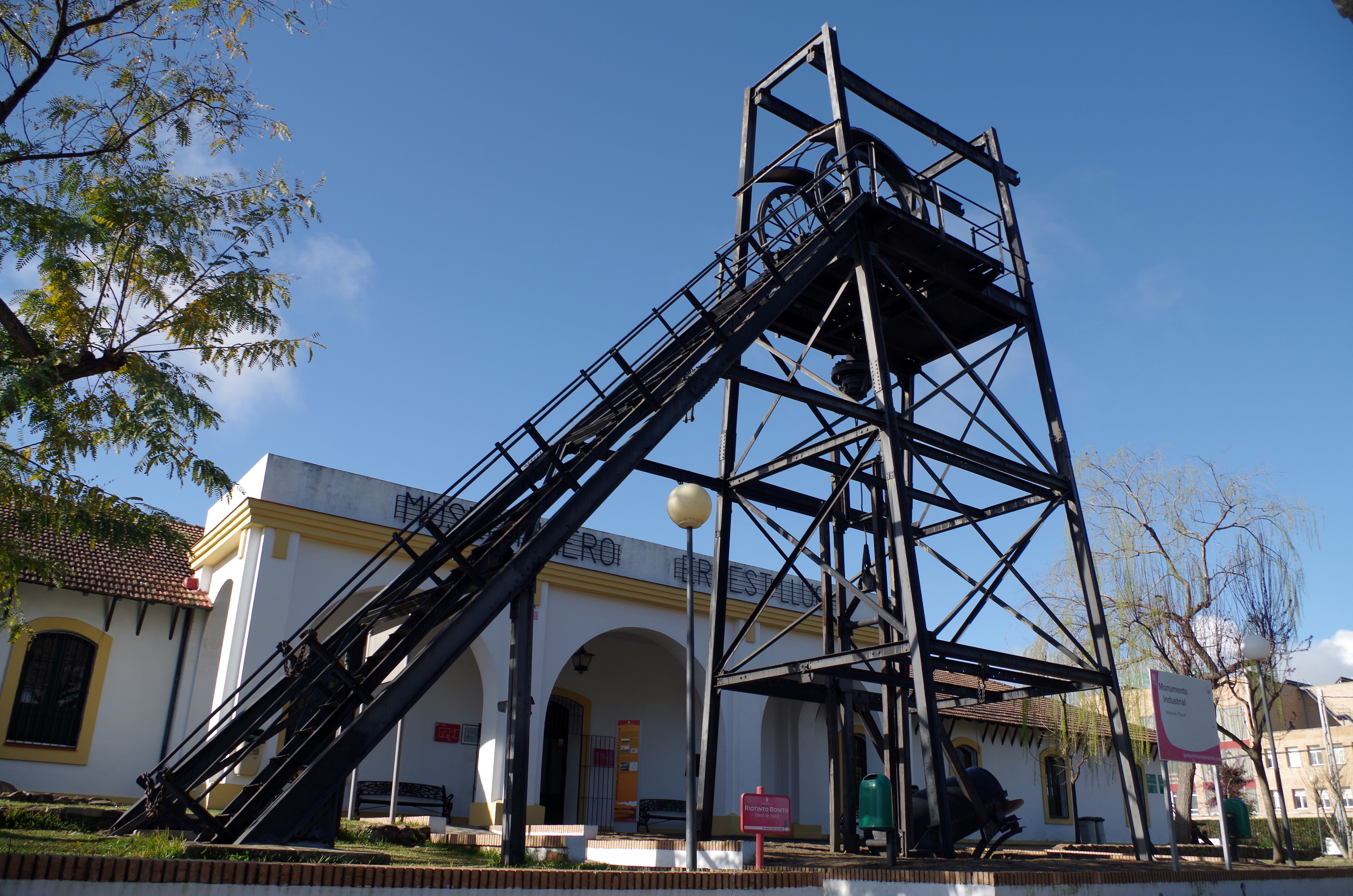
Façade of the Mining Museum.

Rio Tinto Minera even had a Historical Heritage Department in charge of recovering and documenting the archaeological remains found during the course of the mining work. Soundings were carried out in the areas of Filón Norte, Corta de Lago, Cerro del Moro, Marismilla and Tres Cruces-Planes. The company also financed the Archaeometallurgical Project of the Province of Huelva (Proyecto Arqueometalúrgico de la Provincia de Huelva), which focused on archaeological research.

On the initiative of Río Tinto Minera in 1987, the Río Tinto Foundation was created, a private non-profit institution whose objectives included the conservation and restoration of the existing heritage in the area. To this end, the creation of a Mining Park for cultural, tourist and recreational purposes was envisaged. The RTM transferred to the Foundation a large part of its heritage assets inherited from the previous owners of the mines. This was the beginning of a work that a few years later would lead to the inauguration of the Riotinto Mining Museum (1992) and the start-up of the Tourist Mining Train (1994).

== Archive collections ==
At present, the documentary collections of Río Tinto Minera are under the custody of the Mining Park.

== Bibliography ==
- Arenas Posadas, Carlos (2017). "Riotinto, el declive de un mito minero (1954-2003)". Revista de Historia Industrial (in Spanish) (69). Barcelona: Universidad de Barcelona: 109–142. ISSN 1132-7200.
- Delgado, Aquilino; Campos, Ángel; Fiñana, Francisco (2007). "La recuperación del patrimonio ferroviario llevada a cabo por Fundación Río Tinto. Cuenca minera de Riotinto (Huelva)". Sociedad Española para la Defensa del Patrimonio Geológico y Minero (in Spanish) (8). Madrid: De Re Metallica: 19–28. ISSN 1888-8615.
- Escalera Reyes, Javier (1999). "Minería y sociedad en la Cuenca del Riotinto". Demófilo. Revista de cultura tradicional (in Spanish) (32). Sevilla: Fundación Machado: 117–136.
- Ferrero Blanco, María Dolores (2000). "Un modelo de minería contemporánea: Huelva, del colonialismo a la mundialización". Universidad de Huelva (in Spanish).
- García, Francisco Javier; Delgado, Aquilino; Felicidades, Jesús (2013). "El turismo en la cuenca minera de Riotinto". Cuadernos de Turismo (in Spanish) (31). Murcia: Universidad de Murcia: 129–152. ISSN 1139-7861.
- Pascual Domenech, Pere (2008). "La industria del cobre en España II: de 1976 a 2005". Revista de Historia Industrial (in Spanish) (38). Barcelona: 115–159. ISSN 1132-7200.
- Paz Sánchez, José Juan de (2014). Entre el puerto y la mina (I): Antecedentes del movimiento obrero organizado en Huelva (1870-1912) (in Spanish). Huelva: Servicio de Publicaciones de la Universidad de Huelva.
- Pérez López, Juan Manuel (2009). "El Archivo Histórico Minero de Fundación Río Tinto como ejemplo de archivo del mundo del trabajo" (PDF). Arch-e. Revista Andaluza de Archivos (in Spanish) (2). Junta de Andalucía. Consejería de Cultura y Patrimonio Histórico: 64–93. ISSN 1989-5577.
- Pérez Macías, Juan Aurelio; Delgado, Aquilino (2007). "La metalla de Riotinto en época julio-claudia". Universidad de Huelva (in Spanish) (Juan Aurelio Pérez Macías, Aquilino Delgado Domínguez ed.): 37–184.
