= Tourist Mining Train =

Spanish tourist train in the province of Huelva

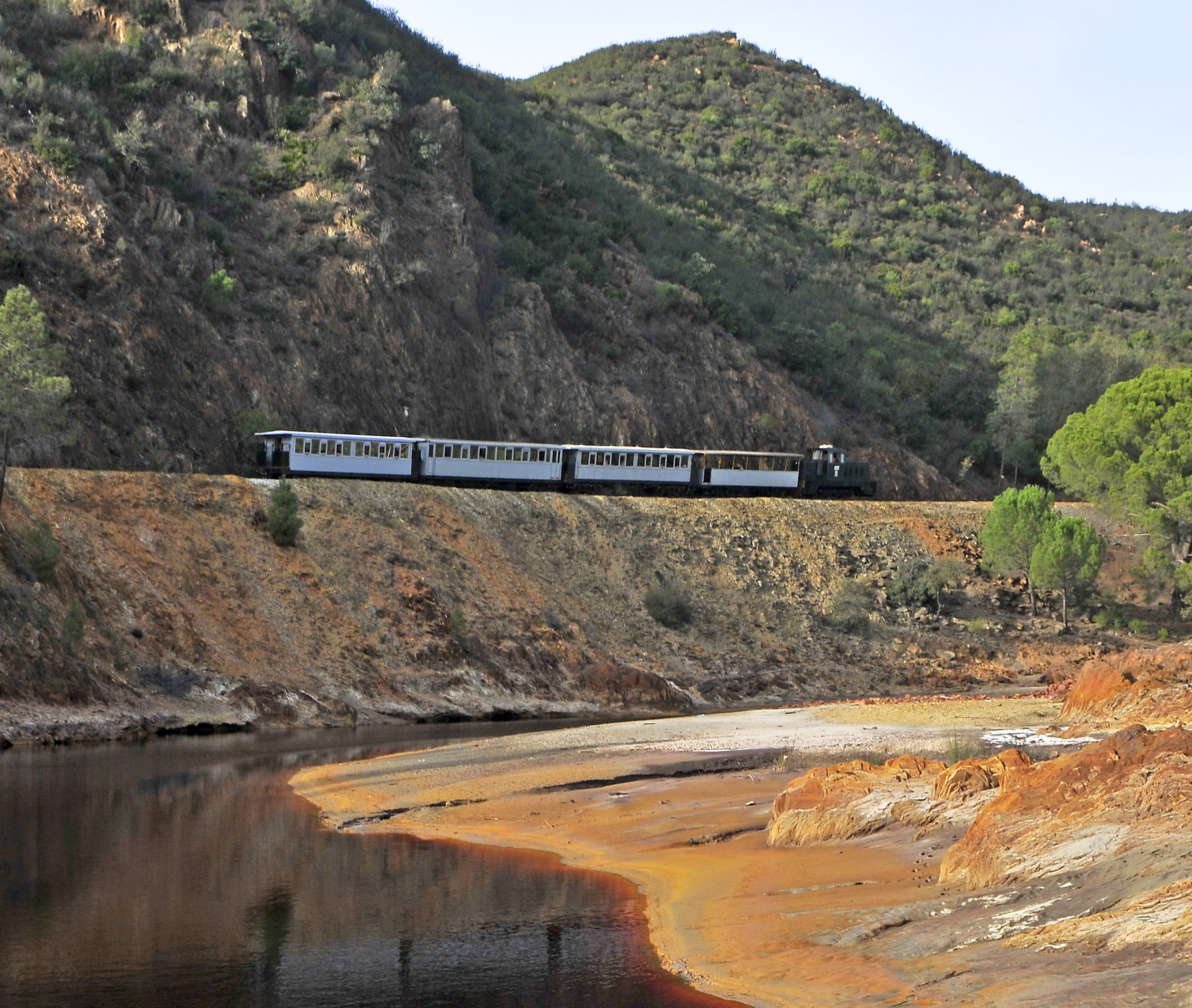
- The tourist train traveling along the Tinto River in 2014.

Overview
- Native name: Ferrocarril Turístico Minero
- Locale: Spain, Huelva
- Transit type: Tourist train

Operation
- Began operation: 4 November 1994
- Operator: Fundación Río Tinto

Technical
- Track gauge: 1,067 mm (3 ft 6 in)

The Tourist Mining Train is a Spanish tourist train that travels along the historic Riotinto Railway, in the province of Huelva, autonomous community of Andalusia. The first railway services were started in 1994 by the Río Tinto Foundation, using historical rolling stock. The tourist train is part of the Rio Tinto Mining Park, constituting one of its most attractive elements.

The total distance covered by the tourist train is about 22 kilometers, including the round trip.

== History ==
In 1984, the Riotinto mining railway was decommissioned after more than a century of service, thus abandoning the infrastructures. By the end of the 1980s, the possibility of its recovery for tourism purposes started to be considered, within the rehabilitation plan of the former mining basin. Services started in November 1994, by the Rio Tinto Foundation, after partially rehabilitating the old railway line. The train initially covered a short route between Talleres Mina and Zarandas-Naya Station, but from 1997 it would be extended to Los Frailes. Plans were originally made to extend the route to El Manzano or Manantiales, but it has not happened.

Since the tourist train inauguration, it has become one of the main attractions of the Rio Tinto Mining Park, being very popular among visitors to the historic mining basin. In 2006, the tourist train transported 66,843 visitors. Because of this success, services have been extended over time, and initiatives such as the "Moon Train" — circulating on certain summer evenings — have also emerged.

== Characteristics ==
The tourist train is available in two types: diesel traction and steam traction. The first one travels between the stations of Talleres Mina and Los Frailes, with a route length of 22 kilometers — round trip. The second one is powered by steam traction and travels between Talleres Mina and Zarandas, running only at certain times of the year. The tourist train has passenger cars that are reproductions of originals based on 19th century designs. The Rio Tinto Mining Park currently owns the two oldest steam locomotives in Spain still operational. These are locomotives No. 14 and No. 51, built in 1875 and 1890 respectively.

== Gallery ==
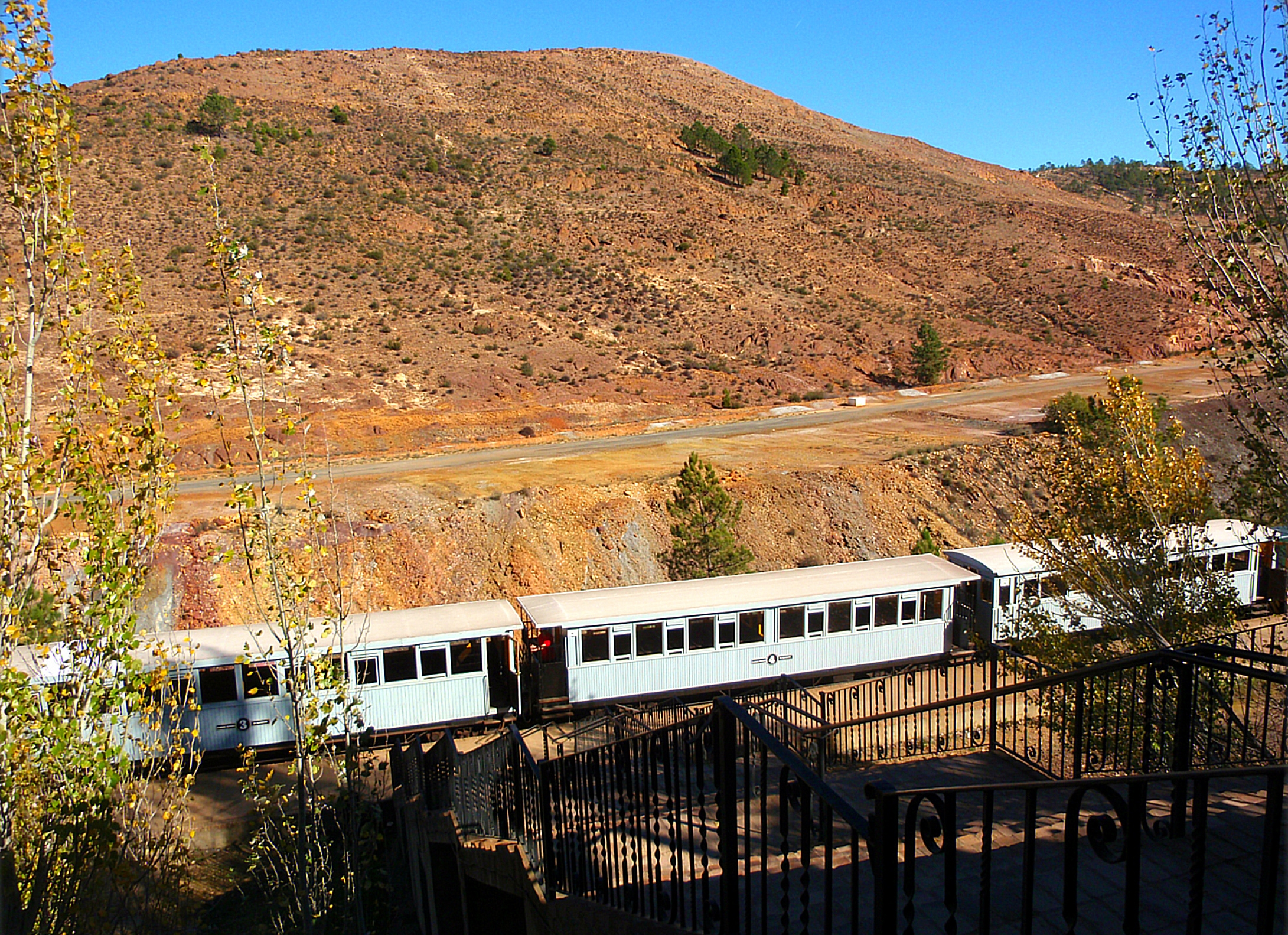
The tourist train at Talleres Mina train station (2016).

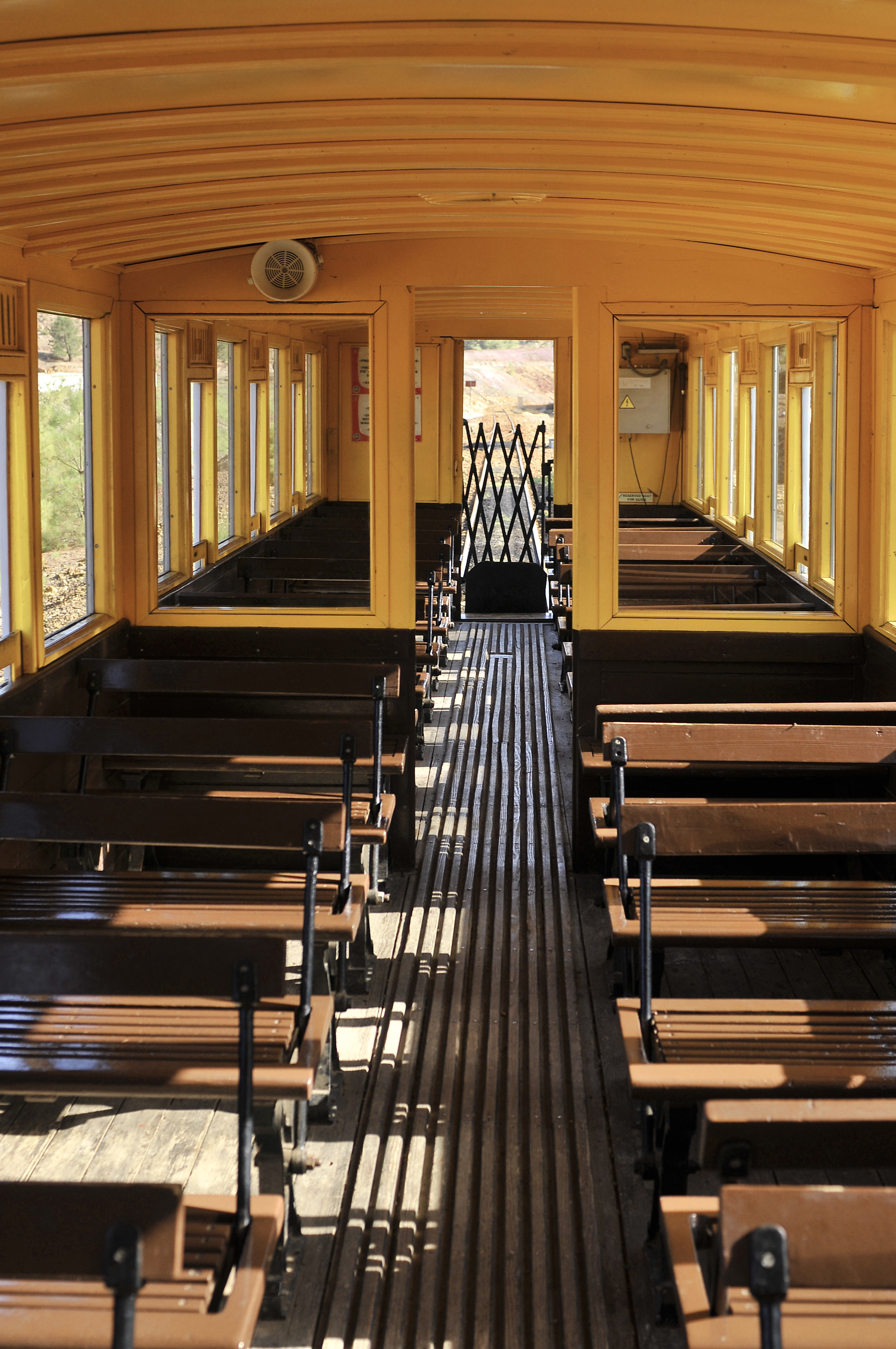
Interior view of one of the cars (2014).

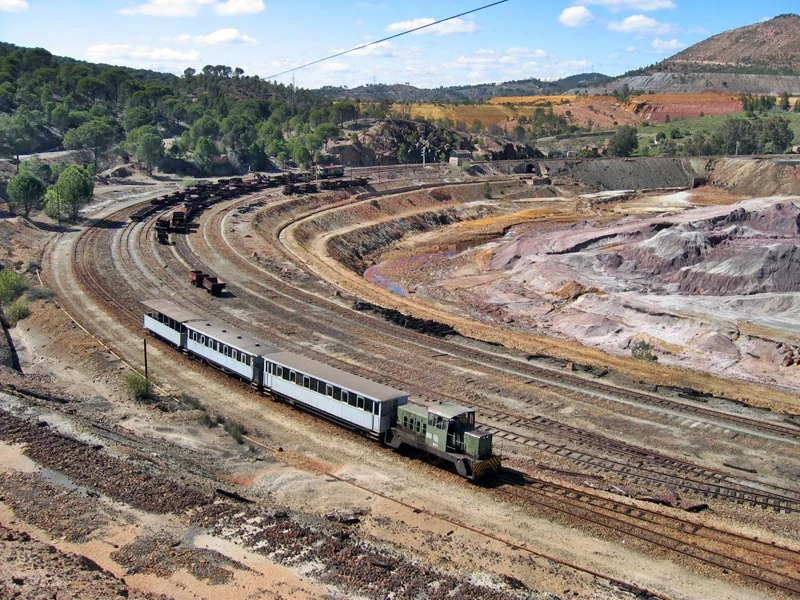
The tourist train as it passes the Zarandas-Naya train station (2007).

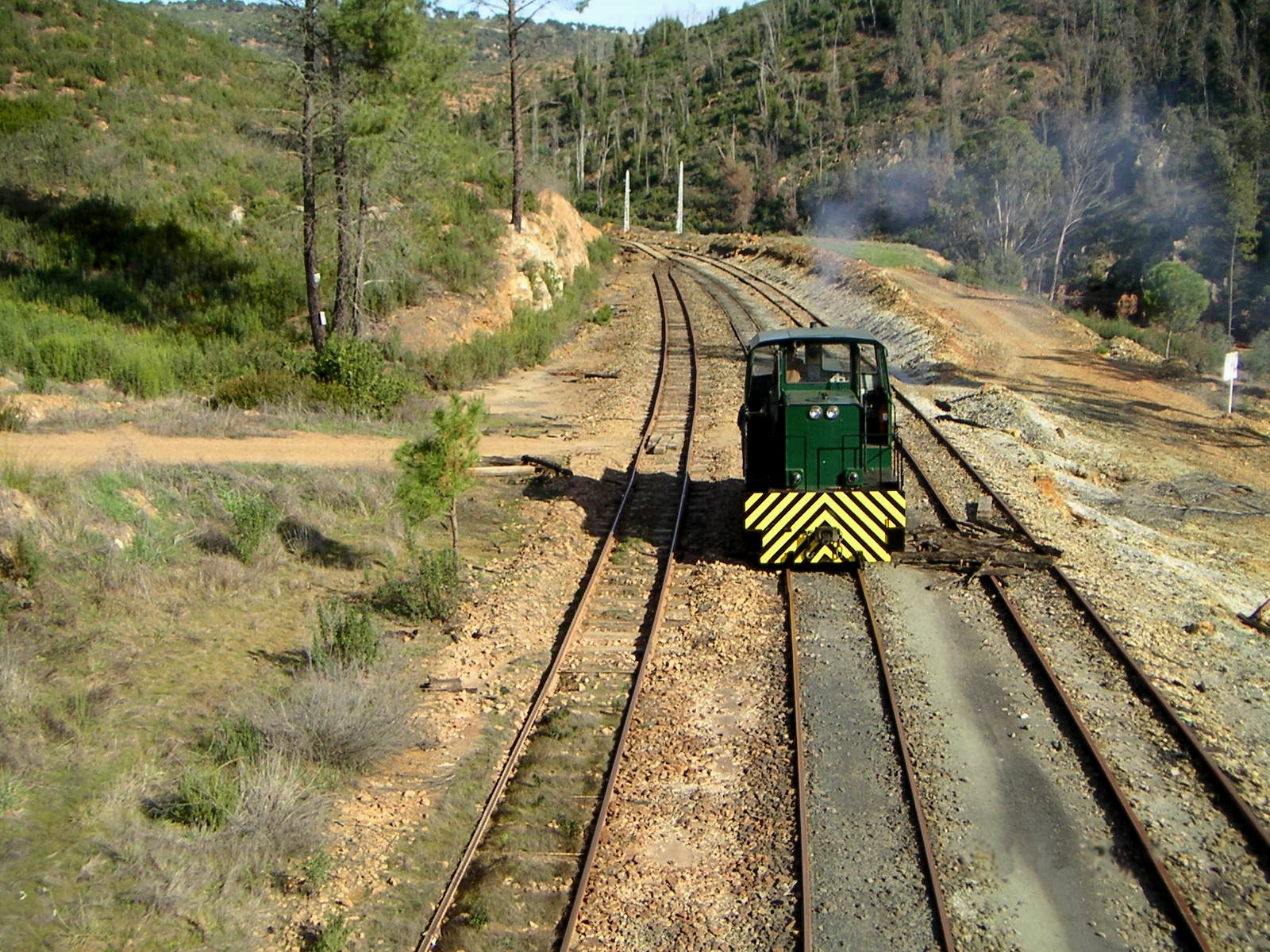
Tourist train diesel locomotive (2007).

== See also ==
- Tharsis railway line
- Río Tinto Foundation
- Riotinto Railway
- Madrid, Zaragoza and Alicante railway
- Riotinto Mining Museum
- Peña del Hierro mine

== Bibliography ==
- Bayón Mariné, Fernando (2009). 50 Años del turismo español. Un análisis histórico y estructural (in Spanish). Madrid: Centro de Estudios Ramón Areces. ISBN 978-84-8594-288-6.
- Delgado, Aquilino; Campos, Ángel; Fiñana, Francisco (2007). La recuperación del patrimonio ferroviario llevada a cabo por Fundación Río Tinto. Cuenca minera de Riotinto (Huelva) (in Spanish). Madrid: Sociedad Española para la Defensa del Patrimonio Geológico y Minero. pp. 19–28. ISSN 1888-8615.
- Delgado, Aquilino; Campos, Ángel (2009). El ferrocarril turístico minero. El renacimiento del Río Tinto Railway (in Spanish). At: Aquilino Delgado Domínguez. Universidad de Huelva. pp. 53–54.
- García, Francisco Javier; Delgado, Aquilino; Felicidades, Jesús (2013). El turismo en la cuenca minera de Riotinto (in Spanish). Murcia: Universidad de Murcia. pp. 129–152. ISSN 1139-7861.
