= Riotinto-Nerva mining basin =

Spanish mining area in the province of Huelva, Andalusia

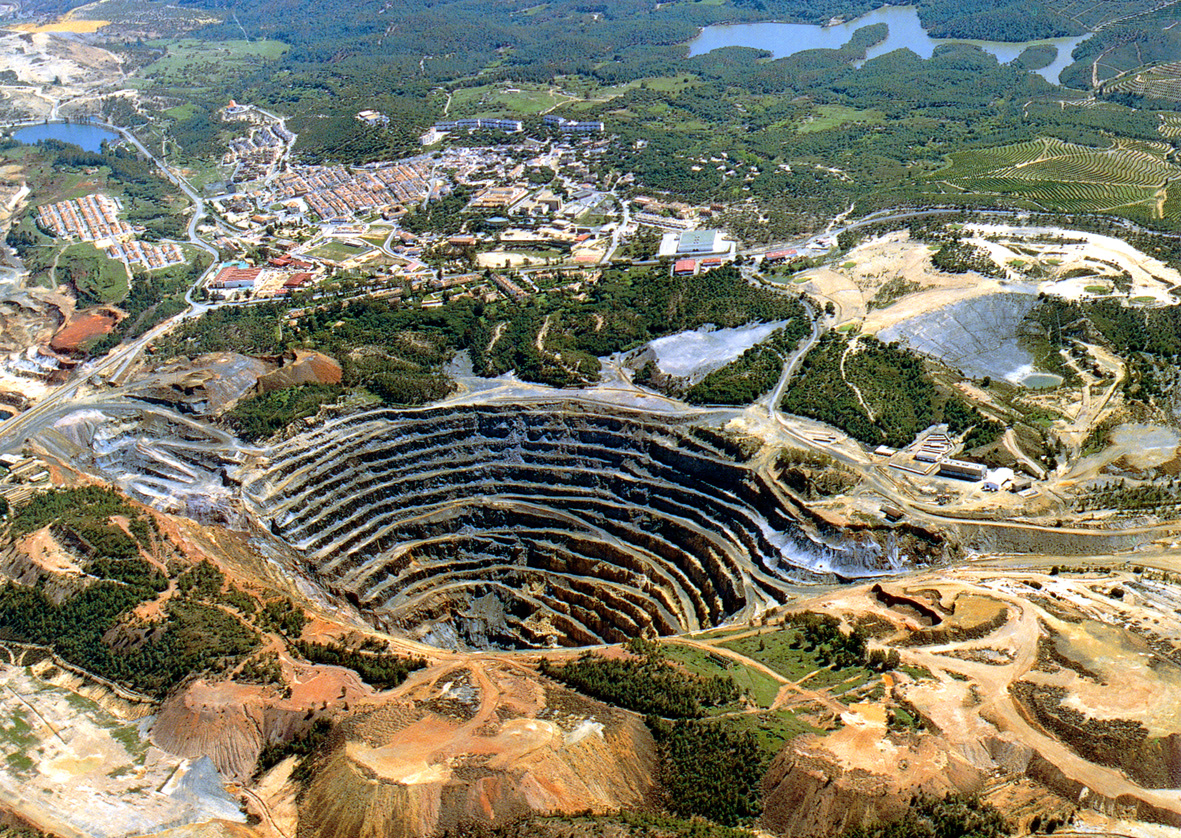
Aerial view of Corta Atalaya, next to the municipality of Minas de Riotinto.

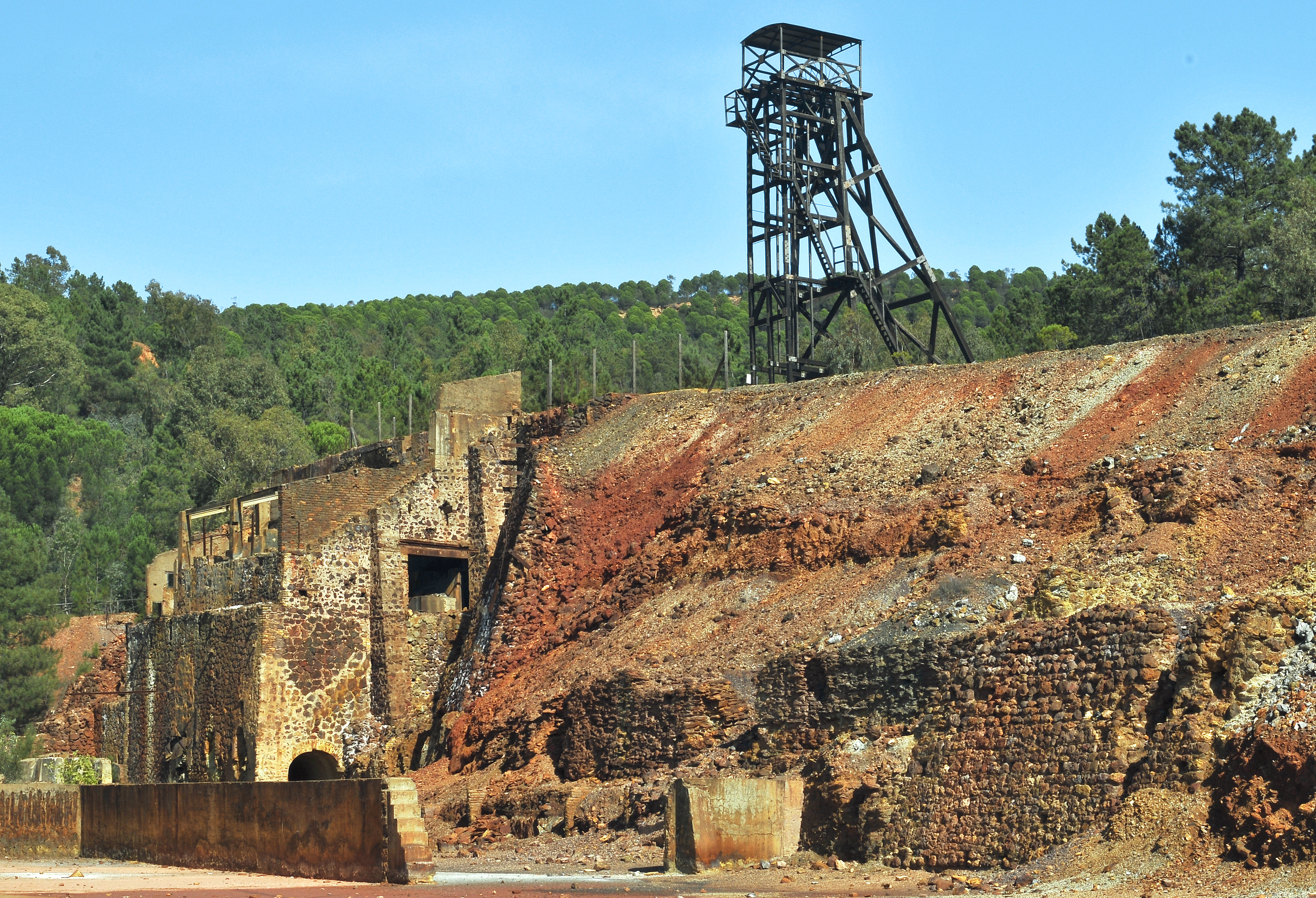
Malacate and former crushing plant of the Peña del Hierro Mine (Nerva).

The Riotinto-Nerva mining basin is a Spanish mining area located in the northeast of the province of Huelva (Andalusia), which has its main population centers in the municipalities of El Campillo, Minas de Riotinto and Nerva, in the region of the Cuenca Minera. It is also part of the Iberian Pyrite Belt.

Historically, this area has been exploited for mining purposes, and a major industrial complex was established in contemporary times. Although there is evidence of this type of activity in the area during protohistoric times, it was not until Roman times when an organized exploitation of its deposits took place. After the activity of the mines was resumed in the Modern Age, the Riotinto basin experienced its peak between the end of the 19th century and the middle of the 20th century under the management of the British Rio Tinto Company Limited. A significant industrial and demographic boom took place during those years. Nowadays, the mineral extraction activity continues, mainly in the Cerro Colorado, although without reaching the production levels it had in the past.

The basin holds an extensive historical and industrial heritage as a result of the activities that took place during the Contemporary Age, especially those related to the British period. As a result, in recent decades various initiatives aimed at its preservation and use for tourism purposes were implemented. In 2005, the Riotinto-Nerva mining area was declared Bien de Interés Cultural with the category of Sitio histórico.

== Characteristics ==
The Riotinto-Nerva mining basin is located in the northeastern part of the province of Huelva, within the historical region of eastern Andévalo, at 418 meters above sea level. The basin has an approximate extension of 170 square kilometers. Like other deposits in southwestern Spain, the Riotinto-Nerva area is part of the Iberian pyrite belt. Because of this, it has important reserves of pyrite and chalcopyrite, minerals with multiple applications in the field of industry. The mining area is framed within the low mountain landscape that predominates in the Andévalo, with a relief of relatively smooth terrain - between 700 and 500 meters. In terms of physical geography, there are hills, mountains, and eroded areas. Notably, the physiognomy of this area has been considerably altered throughout history as a result of mining activity.

The Riotinto complex was formed by several polymetallic masses extending over an area of 4 square kilometers and hosting a total of 500 Mt (megatonnes) of ore. The main formations identified are Filón Norte, Filón Sur, Masa Planes, Masa San Dionisio, and Masa San Antonio. The latter extends over the municipality of Nerva and, compared to others, is the most recent mineral formation (second half of the 20th century). The presence of the Peña del Hierro mass also stood out in Nerva.

== History ==
=== From Antiquity to the Middle Ages ===
The Riotinto mines have been described as "one of the most important mining districts" of Antiquity. There is evidence of the existence of mining activities in the area of the current basin during the Copper Age and the Bronze Age, although these would not reach a greater relevance until several centuries later. The isotopic analysis at Riotinto have revealed that there was already considerable activity since at least 366 BC, while the oldest remains of mining operations and human settlements have been found in the area of Filón Norte. The minerals may have had two possible export routes: a first route, that reached the Guadalquivir River through a complex mountain road; and a second, through the Tinto River.

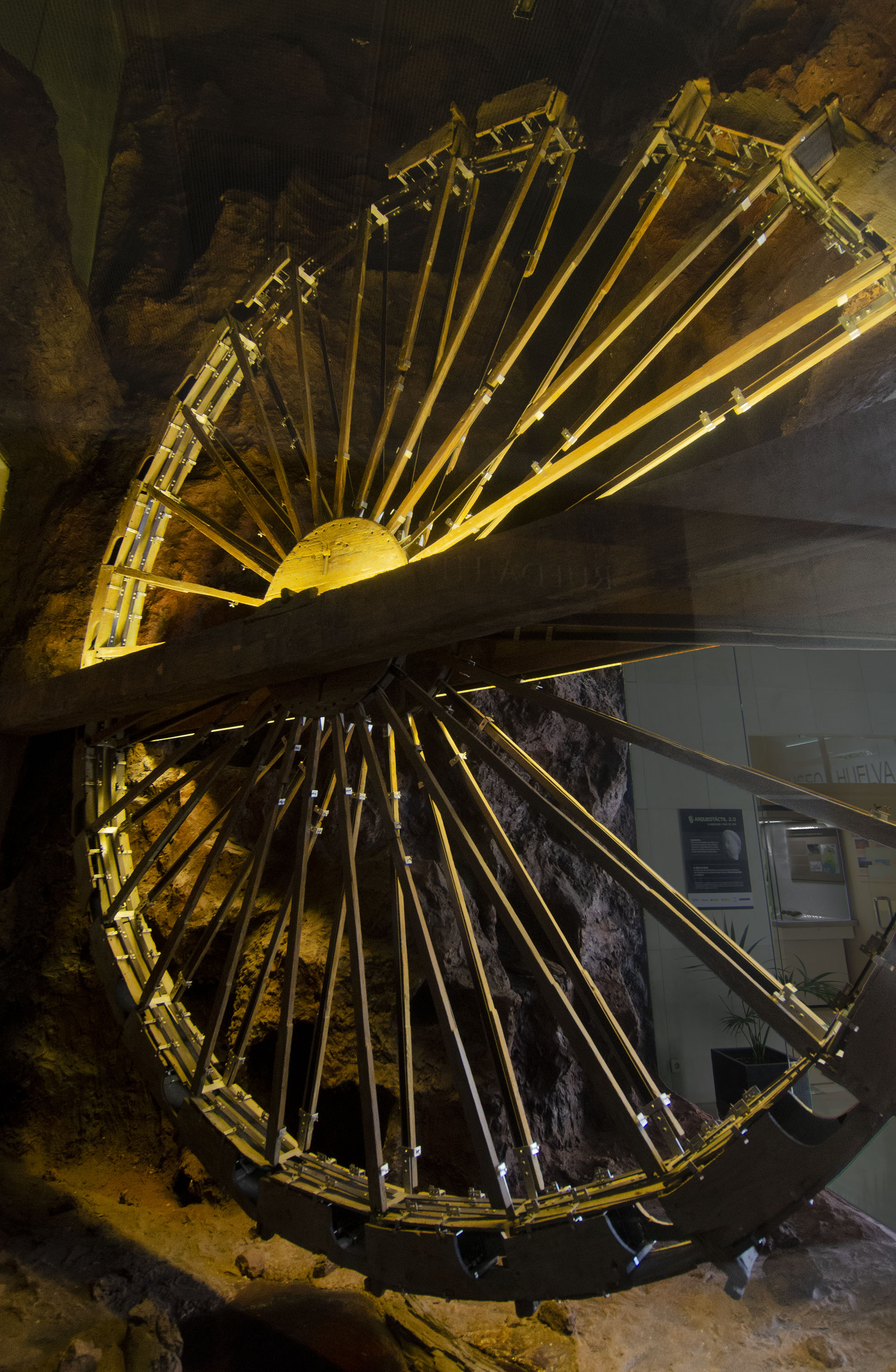
Hydropowered scoopwheel used by the Romans

Although the information is limited, there is also physical evidence indicating that in Roman times several mines in the Riotinto area were in operation. It was between the 2nd century BC and 2nd century AD when mining activity in the area reached its peak, especially after the reign of Augustus. The Romans carried out the extraction labors by means of a network of underground galleries and complex systems of hydropowered scoopwheels to move the water inside. The working conditions in the galleries were very harsh for the miners - mostly slaves - due to dust, high humidity, poor lighting and high temperatures. Different contemporary studies have pointed out that silver was the metal of greatest production during the High Roman Empire, Riotinto being among the best silver mines of Antiquity. From the Augustus era, the extraction of copper also reached a great relevance.

The Romans erected numerous buildings in the area to support mining and metallurgical activities, such as furnaces and foundries, as well as roads to facilitate the transit of goods. The current Corta del Lago housed the main Roman settlement in the area, which classical sources identify as Urion or Urium. Likewise, there are several necropolises (Huerta de la Cana, La Dehesa) related to the High Roman Empire. The Riotinto mines remained active until the last quarter of 2 AC, when the deposits of the Iberian pyritic belt declined in favor of the then booming mines of Dacia or Britannia.

The metallurgical work carried out in Roman times left a large quantity of slag and considerably altered the physiognomy of the territory. Centuries later, much of this slag would be reused for various purposes, such as flux material in metallurgical processes. Many of the archaeological remains from the Roman period would be recovered and preserved from the 19th century onwards as a result of the work carried out by British engineers. However, the first findings of this type were made by Spaniards in the middle of the 18th century. (Note: In 1762, exploration work was carried out in the Roman galleries of what is now the municipality of Nerva.—Pérez Macías & Delgado (2007), p. 39) During the medieval era, mining production in the Riotinto area was not significant. In the Islamic era, most work was focused on the exploitation of copper sulfates and iron sulfate.

=== Reactivation in the Early modern period ===
The possibility of reactivating the exploitation of the Riotinto mines was considered during the 16th century, under the reign of Philip II. The deposits were owned by the Spanish Crown at that time. However, this project was eventually abandoned in favor of the Guadalcanal mines (Seville), which offered better prospects. The American mines were of greater interest to the authorities, in contrast to those of Huelva, which were considered to be exhausted after their intense exploitation in Roman times.

In the early 18th century, mining interest in this area was reborn. In 1725, the Swede Liebert Wolters Vonsiohielm was granted a lease by the Crown to exploit the Riotinto deposits for a period of thirty years. Wolters proceeded first to drain the old Roman galleries. After his death in 1727, the management of the mines passed into the hands of his nephew, Samuel Tiquet, and a Spanish partner. The mining works were focused on Filón Sur. After Tiquet's death, the Spanish partner, Francisco Thomas Sanz, took over the management of the mines, under whose direction the mines reached high production rates. Due to the influence of the mining works, the town of Riotinto was also established during this period, next to Filón Sur.

The Riotinto mines were abandoned and inactive during the War of Independence due to the difficulties that the country underwent in those years. In 1823, after a trip to the area by the engineer Fausto Elhuyar, the facilities were rehabilitated and work was resumed. Between 1829 and 1849, the Marquess of Remisa leased the exploitation of the deposits; many irregularities took place during this period. (Note: The engineers Fernando Caravantes and Francisco de Sales, who visited the Riotinto mines in 1840 and 1841, reported that the area's resources were being plundered under the management of the Marquis of Remisa. The extraction activities were generating a high risk of future landslides as well as causing large-scale local deforestation to obtain fuel for the furnaces and smelters. This was jeopardizing the future and viability of the operation.—Flores Caballero (2007), p. 19-20) After 1849, the Spanish Royal Treasury resumed direct management of the deposits. Influenced by the industrial revolution that was taking place, the Riotinto mines began to face problems due to the lack of infrastructure and technology, which prevented an adequate exploitation. However, in the middle of the 19th century, the poor financial situation of the Spanish State made it impossible for it to make optimal use of its mining properties.

=== British phase: the peak years ===
By the middle of the 19th century, the Riotinto mines aroused the interest of international capital, in a context in which the industrial take-off that some European countries were experiencing had increased the need for access to new sources of raw materials. Since the public treasury was going through a state of crisis, the possibility of the State selling these deposits had already been considered. After the triumph of the revolution of 1868 and the political change that followed, in March 1870 the minister Laureano Figuerola presented a project for the sale of the Riotinto mines to the Cortes. However, the proceedings were delayed for several years.

In 1873, the House of Rothschild acquired the ownership of the deposits from the government of the First Republic, which was transferred months later to the newly created Rio Tinto Company Limited (RTC), of British origin. The new owner of the basin started a much more intense exploitation. Mining work was initially concentrated in "La Mina" deposit (or "Filón Sur"), although by 1881, the operations had already been expanded to other parts of the area. Among the minerals extracted from Riotinto were copper and pyrite. RTC built several industries for the mining-metallurgical treatment, which included ore washing plants, factories, smelting, power plants, warehouses, etc. By the early 20th century, the Zarandas-Naya area was the main center for the processing of ore coming from the deposits of the basin.

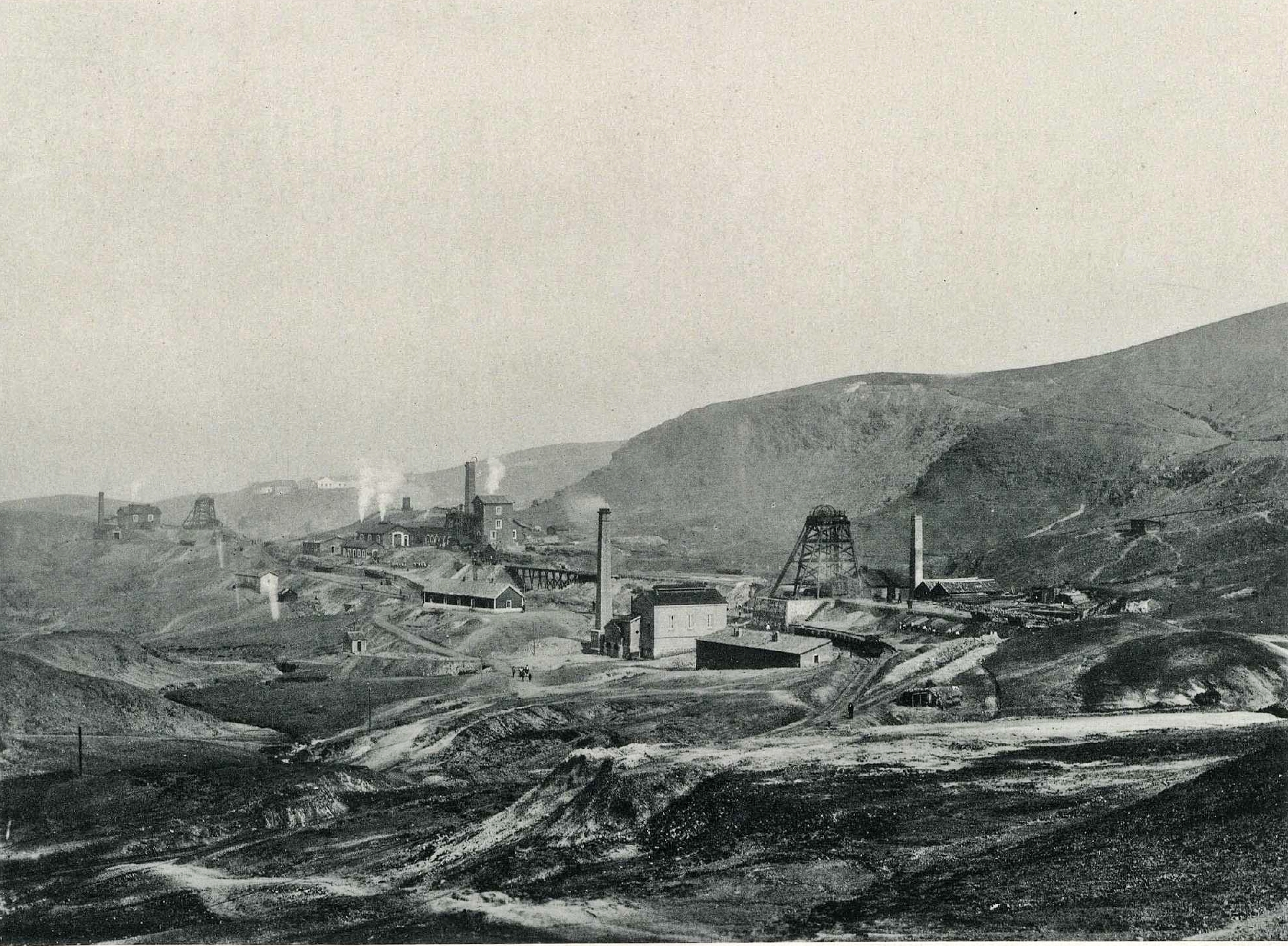
Mining industries and installations in the San Dionisio ore mass (1892)

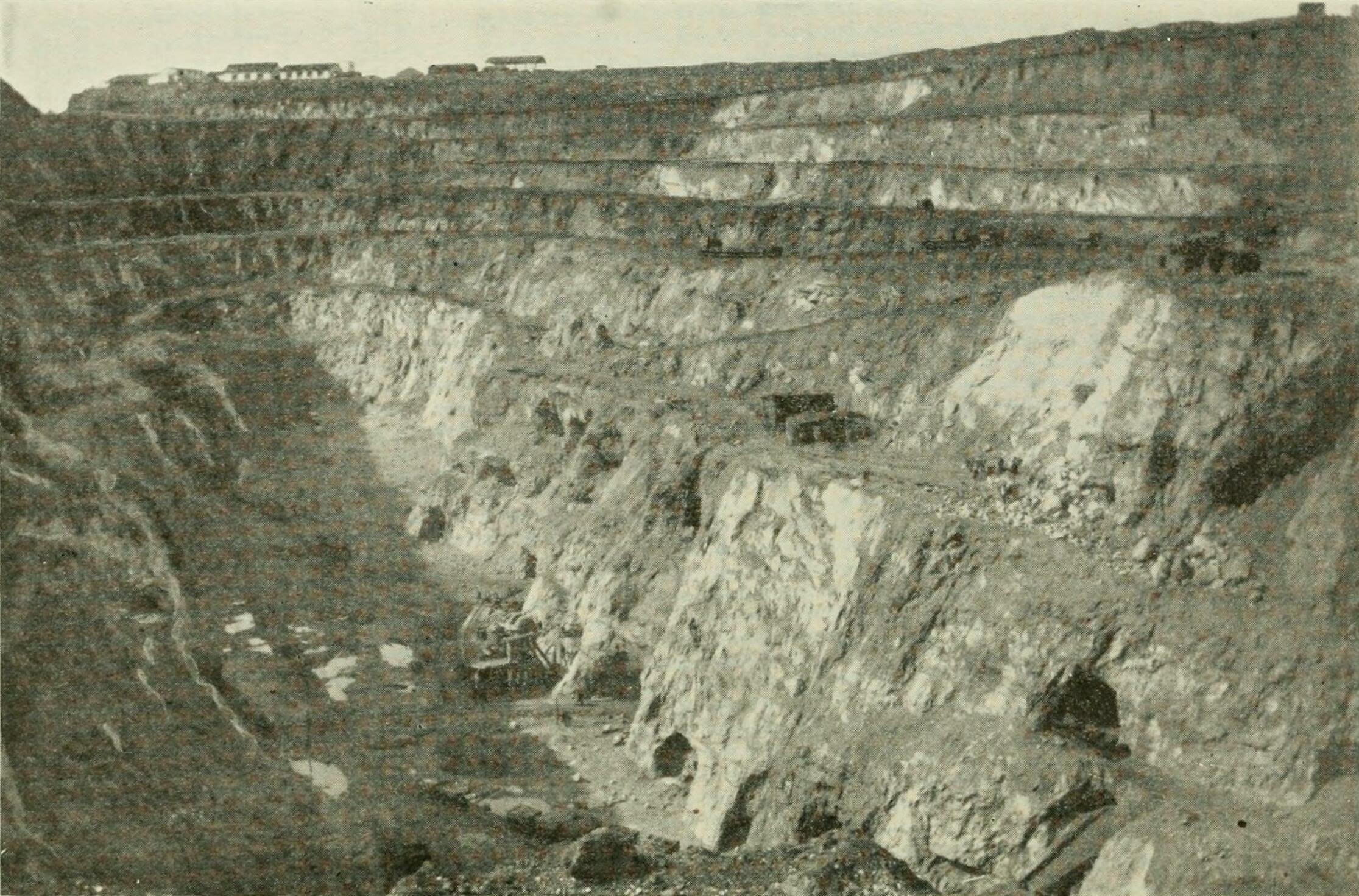
Extraction works inside a Riotinto corta (1920)

As the mining operations progressed, a series of main exploitations emerged in the basin, including Corta Atalaya, Filón Sur, Filón Norte and Corta Peña del Hierro. Some of them constituted mining complexes that were composed of several deposits. An important mining-industrial complex was also formed around the towns of Riotinto and Nerva, which grew in size and number of inhabitants during those years. Within a short time, the region became one of the most important mining areas in Spain. In addition, under British management, the Riotinto mines became "a world reference".

In order to improve the access to this network of mines and industrial facilities, the RTC built a narrow-gauge railroad, inaugurated in 1875 and with a network of nearly 360 kilometers between the main track and the various branches. Minerals were also transported through this railway line to the port of Huelva, from where they were shipped abroad. The intense traffic led the RTC to build an important ore deposit near Huelva, called "Polvorín".

The British maintained the traditional system of galleries, although by the end of the 19th century they began to implement open-pit mining - the so-called "cortas" - that allowed for a greater volume of mineral extraction. This helped shape the current landscape of the area, with the large boreholes. Although RTC was the hegemonic company in the Riotinto basin, the control of the Peña del Hierro mine was in the hands of several owners, among them The Peña Copper Mines Company Limited. This company had several conflicts with the RTC at the time. (Note: A branch line linking Peña del Hierro with the Riotinto railway was in operation since 1883 and ore transportation by rail was subcontracted to RTC. However, the high transport rates and a series of disagreements between the two parties led to the split. The construction of the Tumbanales dam by The Peña Copper Mines Company Limited was the high point of the business conflict. In response, RTC management ordered the forcible dismantling of the branch line. As a result, the owner of Peña del Hierro opted to build its own mining railway.—Delgado & Regalado (2012), p. 21 & Delgado & Regalado (2012), p. 22)

The expansion of mining and metallurgical activities meant the need for a greater number of workers, which would eventually lead to an exponential increase in the population of the area. A series of newly created workers' settlements were created over the years: Alto de la Mesa, El Valle, La Atalaya, La Naya, Río Tinto-Estación or La Dehesa. There was also a small colony of British managers and engineers who settled in the Bellavista neighborhood. This was a residential urbanization of victorian architecture style where the English lived a separate life from the Spanish population. The growth of the municipality of Minas de Riotinto was such that its population went from 4957 inhabitants in 1877 to 11603 inhabitants in 1900. The nearby municipality of Nerva also experienced a strong increase in its population during these years in the heat of the mining boom: by 1910 it had 16807 inhabitants.

Working conditions in the mining basin were "extraordinarily harsh" and on numerous occasions led to labor disputes that pitted workers against RTC's British management. Several general strikes took place between the end of the 19th century and the beginning of the 20th century, the most important being those of 1888, 1913, and 1920. Notably, the 1888 protests were violently suppressed by the forces of law and order, in what has become known as "the year of the shootings".

The 1920 strike - which lasted nine months and involved some 11,000 workers - was even more important, although it would finally fail in its objectives. The reprisals imposed by the RTC after this strike led to the dismantling of the trade union movement in the area for many years, and it was not until the times of the Second Republic when it was reorganized. During the 1930s, labor conflicts increased due to the effects of the crisis of 1929. In July 1936, after the outbreak of the Civil War, the mining area was placed in the "Republican Zone" controlled by the workers' committees. However, it did not last long because a few weeks later, the rebel faction conquered the region with hardly any resistance.

=== Nationalization ===
In 1954, after a complex process in which the Franco regime intervened, the Rio Tinto mines were "nationalized" and their ownership passed into the hands of several Spanish capitalists, who formed the Compañía Española de Minas de Río Tinto (CEMRT). Although already in decline from the British phase, the mining operations continued in full force under the new ownership. CEMRT had acquired four main deposits, of which three (Filón Sur, Filón Norte and Planes) were almost exhausted and only one (San Dionisio) was fully active. In addition, the mining and industrial facilities were outdated, with a business model focused on the export of minerals; all this would lead to a new line of action. Over the following years, the workforce was readjusted, the facilities were modernized and the mining operations became more mechanized.

Between 1960 and 1962 CEMRT's exploration activities in the basin led to the discovery of the Masa San Antonio, in Nerva, that was exploited through Pozo Rotilio. The exploration and extraction of copper ore from Cerro Colorado was also undertaken by the Río Tinto Patiño consortium, established for this purpose in 1966. The rest of the deposits remained under the management of CEMRT, whose expansion plans led to the creation of the Unión Explosivos Río Tinto (ERT) group in 1970. From that moment on, the workings of the historic Corta Atalaya were expanded in order to mine its significant reserves of pyrites.

During this time, pyrite production became destined for domestic consumption, while the amount of pyrites for export was significantly reduced. A large portion of this pyrites was destined to the factories that were built in the chemical Park of Huelva, created in 1964 to promote the economic development of the area. In this context, several industrial plants in the Riotinto area began to be dismantled and transferred to the chemical park. Activity in the mining basin started to decline in the late 1970s due to the drop in international copper prices and the mining crisis in Huelva. (Note: 1977 was the first year in more than two decades that the exploitation results showed a loss.—Arenas Posadas (2017), p. 125)

=== Latest period ===
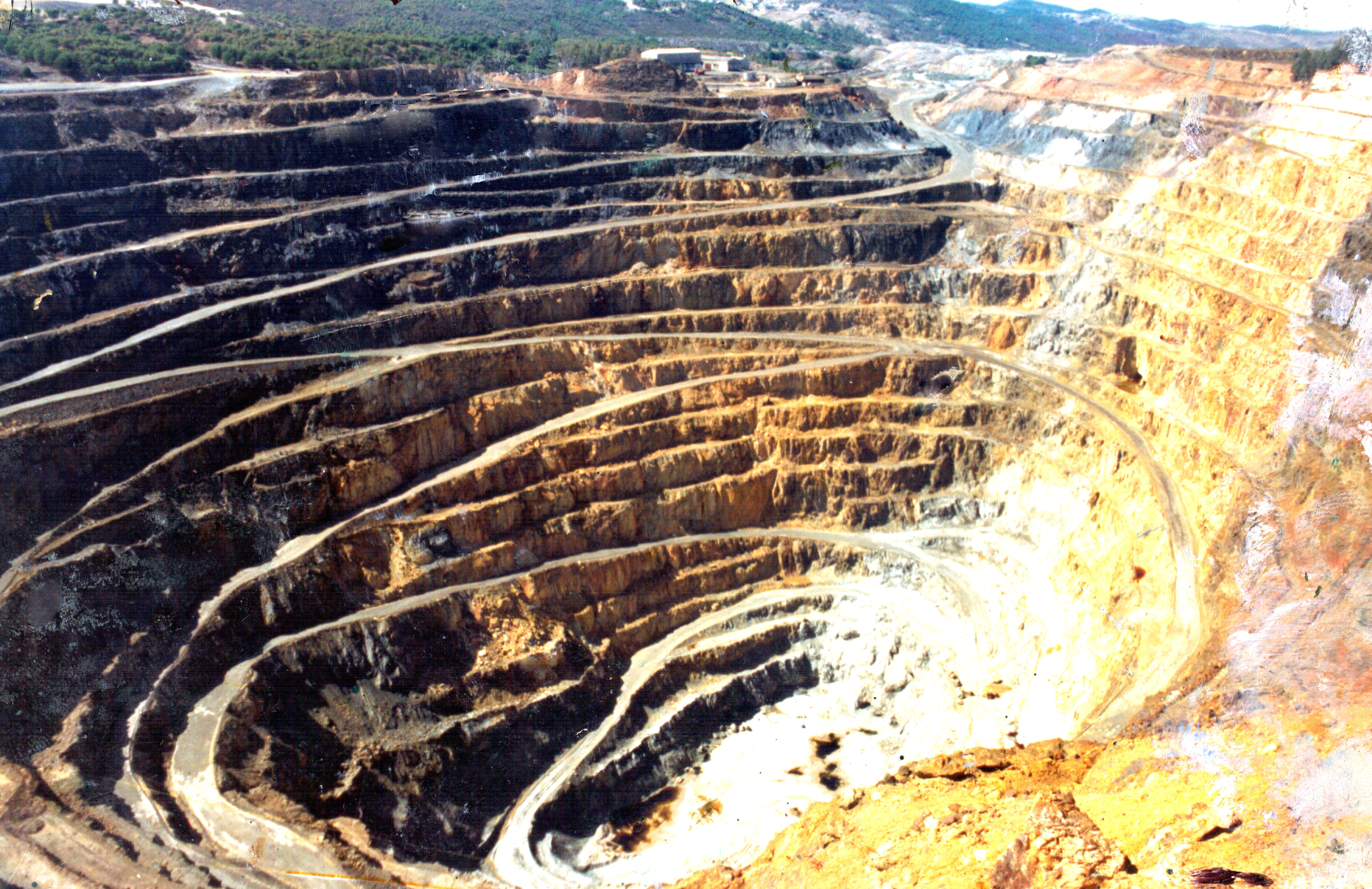
View of Corta Atalaya (1980)

In the 1980s, the persistently poor economic performance led to major labor disputes and the progressive halting of operations on the copper line. Many workers' mobilizations and two general strikes (1978 and 1986) took place during these years. Up to the 1990s, the company Río Tinto Minera (RTM) carried out the main activity in the basin, but the crisis of the industry would eventually lead to the shutdown of most of the facilities in the area.

In 1984, as part of this situation, a decision was made to stop the Riotinto railroad service; from then on, transportation would be carried out by trucks. In 1986, Pozo Alfredo was closed, followed by the closing of Corta Atalaya in 1992. Only the extraction of gossan at Cerro Colorado was still operational by then. After an unsuccessful attempt by RTM workers to restart the business, mining activities ceased around 2001.

Parallel to this process, during the 1980s, various proposals were made that focused on the conservation of the environmental and patrimonial heritage of the mining basin, faced with the threat of its disappearance. Plans were made to establish a Mining Park for cultural, tourist and recreational purposes, as well as the creation of a Mining Museum and the preservation of the historic Riotinto railway. Major work in this regard has been performed by the Rio Tinto Foundation, an institution that has contributed to the recovery of numerous industrial heritage and the establishment of the tourist mining train.

In the first decade of the 21st century, there were several failed attempts to reactivate the mines, coinciding with the rise in copper prices. Only in 2015 did the Cypriot company Atalaya Mining restart mining works at Riotinto after obtaining the necessary permits from the administration. Since then, the main activity has been developed in the Cerro Colorado deposit, where there are still important copper and gossan reserves. The Atalaya Riotinto Minera company, a Spanish subsidiary of Atalaya Mining, has also been involved in the conservation and enhancement of the historical mining-industrial heritage.

== Industrial heritage ==
Several industrial facilities linked to the mining activity have been built since the reactivation of the mining basin in the 18th century. One of the oldest that have survived to the present day is the San Luis Smelter, built in 1832 next to the South Seam to house the metallurgical activities. The Rio Tinto Company Limited later built new facilities in the area, such as Fundición Mina (1879), Fundición Huerta Romana (1889) or Fundición Bessemer (1901), as well as Cementación Cerda and Cementación Planes to carry out the copper extraction works by wet process. Later on, all hydrometallurgical processes would be concentrated in the Zarandas-Naya area with the construction of Cementación Naya and, in 1932, of the ferrous sulfate ponds. There was also an acid factory installed in Riotinto, which started operating in 1889, followed by a second sulfuric acid plant built in 1929.

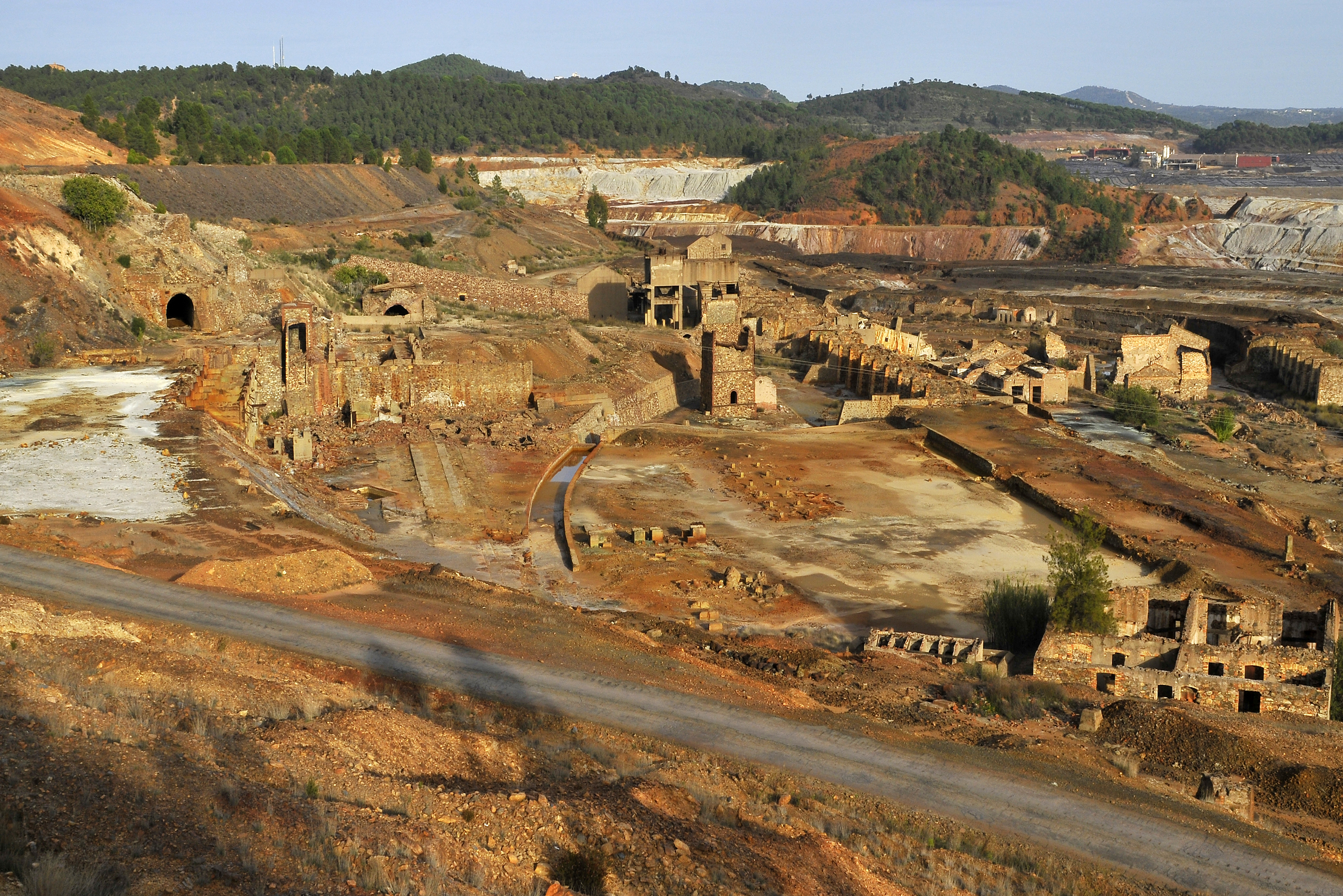
Remains of the "Fundición de piritas" facilities (2014)

With the expansion of activities throughout the basin, the RTC provided electricity as a source of energy to its industrial facilities, the homes of the British personnel, workers' villages, etc. In 1907, a power plant was built in the Huerta Romana area, which was operational between 1909 and 1963.

Starting in the 1880s, ore processing plants were installed in the Zarandas-Naya area, initiating a process of industrialization that would reach its peak in the early 20th century. Thereafter, the area became the processing site for ore from the various deposits and veins, and became de facto the Polo Industrial de Riotinto. In 1907, the new Fundición de Piritas started operations in the Zarandas-Naya area, which later replaced Fundición Bessemer and whose facilities remained in service until 1970. The Cementación Naya and, years later, a crushing plant would also be built in Zarandas to process pyrites from Corta Atalaya. Since the late 1960s, the Riotinto industrial area declined, partly due to the transfer of some plants to the new Chemical Park of Huelva and partly due to the depletion of the mines. The exception to such dynamics was the installation in Cerro Colorado of an industrial plant for gold and silver extraction through the gossan processing.

The increase in hydrometallurgical activities required a greater need for access to water, a commodity that by the end of the 19th century was becoming scarce in the area. By 1878, the RTC had already built the Dique Sur next to the town of Riotinto and the Marismilla reservoir south of Nerva, followed by the construction of the Campofrío reservoir in 1881. The commissioning of the Campofrío reservoir provisionally solved the shortage problems and provided drinking water to the municipalities of the mining basin. In the area of Peña del Hierro, located upstream of the Tinto river, the company that exploited the deposit also built two reservoirs for industrial use: Tumbanales I and Tumbanales II reservoirs. This fact and the severe drought of 1904 contributed to exacerbate the supply problem, which would lead the RTC to build the Zumajo reservoir between 1907 and 1908. Likewise, a series of facilities were set up within the Riotinto basin for the storage of the tailings from the ore processing plants. These were the Gossan dam and the Cobre dam, both located north of La Dehesa.

== Railway network ==
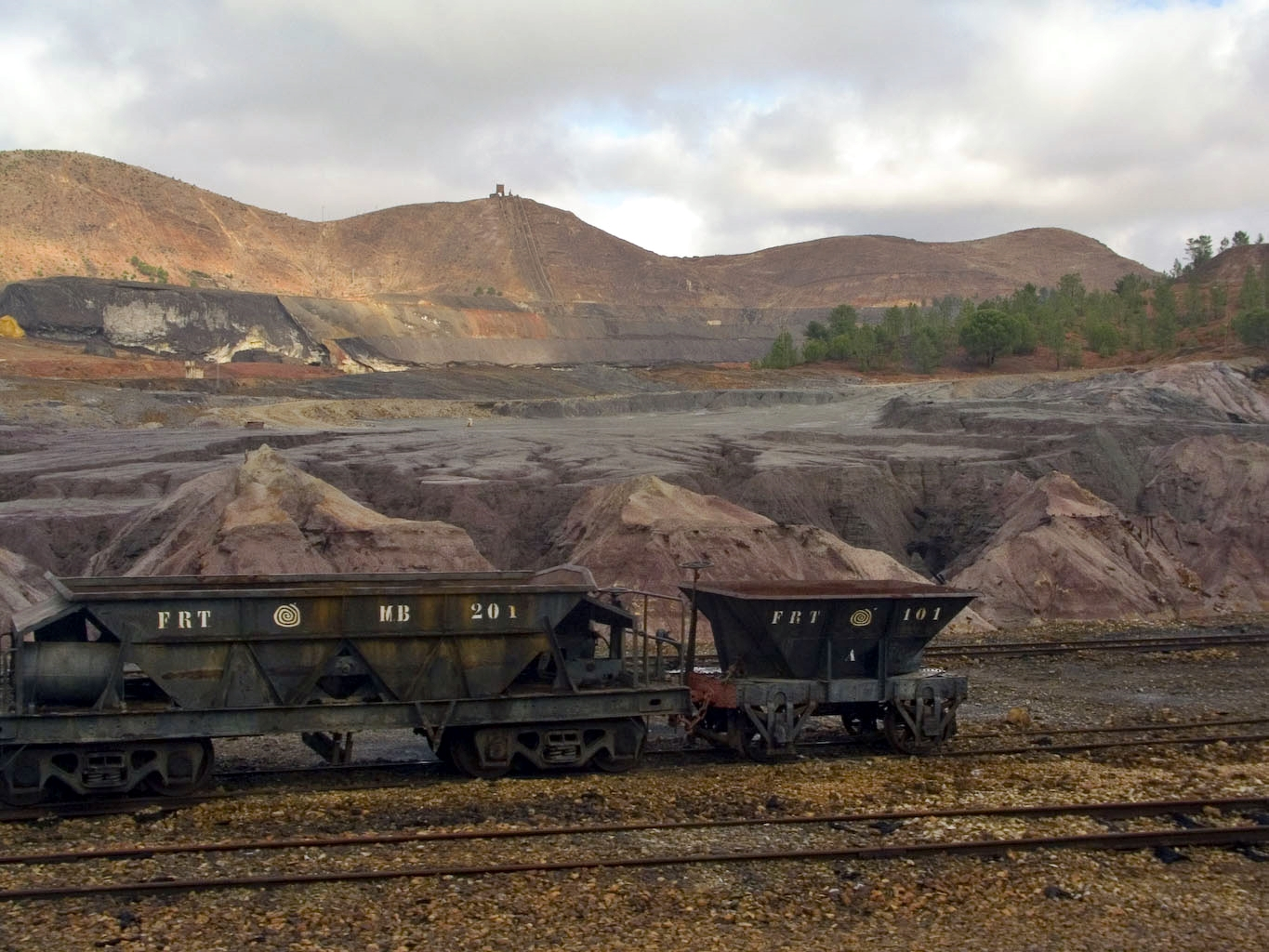
View of Zarandas-Naya's former facilities (2004)

Between 1873 and 1875, the engineers of the RTC built the Riotinto railway to connect the mines with Huelva, in which port was also built a pier. An extensive network of tracks and branches was formed within the basin over the years, connecting the general track with the industrial installations and with the deposits, as was the case of Filón Norte, Corta Atalaya, etc. Among others, branches were built that connected with the Peña del Hierro mine (1883), the branches that reached Zalamea la Real and Nerva (1904) or the subway connection of the Naya tunnel (1916). Two railway complexes were also created, Río Tinto-Estación and Zarandas-Naya, which had wide tracks for receiving and classifying the mining trains. The Riotinto railway was for a long time one of the most important railway lines in Spain, both for its kilometers of track and its extensive rolling stock.

Also operating in the basin was the Peña del Hierro railway, which was active between 1914 and 1954. This 21-kilometer-long route connected the Peña del Hierro deposit with the railway line of the Cala mines, thus facilitating the exit of the ore to a pier on the Guadalquivir river.

== See also ==
- Mining Basins (Asturias)
- Río Tinto Foundation
- Riotinto Railway
- Rio Tinto Company Limited
- Tharsis-La Zarza mining basin
- Tourist Mining Train
- Peña del Hierro mine

== Bibliography ==
- Arenas Posadas, Carlos (1999). Empresa, mercados, mina y mineros. Río Tinto, 1873-1936 (PDF) (in Spanish). Universidad de Huelva.
- Arenas Posadas, Carlos (2017). "Riotinto, el declive de un mito minero (1954-2003)". Revista de Historia Industrial (in Spanish) (69). Barcelona: Universidad de Barcelona: 109–142. ISSN 1132-7200.
- Blázquez, José María (1975). Tartessos y los orígenes de la colonización fenicia en Occidente (in Spanish). Salamanca: Universidad de Salamanca. ISBN 9788440086112.
- Campos, Juan Manuel; Vidal, Nuria de la O (2003). Las ciudades hispano-romanas del territorio onubense. Estado de la cuestión. Revista d'arqueologia de Ponent. Lérida: Universidad de Lérida. pp. 41–81. ISSN 1131-883X.
- Chic, Genaro (2007). "La zona minera del suroeste de Hispania en época julio-claudia". In Juan Aurelio Pérez Macías; Aquilino Delgado Domínguez (eds.). Las minas de Riotinto en época julio-claudia. Universidad de Huelva. pp. 11–36. ISBN 9788416621958.
- Delgado, Aquilino; Campos, Ángel; Fiñana, Francisco (2007). La recuperación del patrimonio ferroviario llevada a cabo por Fundación Río Tinto. Cuenca minera de Riotinto (Huelva). De Re Metallica. Madrid: Sociedad Española para la Defensa del Patrimonio Geológico y Minero. pp. 19–28. ISSN 1888-8615.
- Delgado, Aquilino; Regalado, María de la Cinta (2012). Catálogo del patrimonio minero industrial de la mina de Peña de Hierro (Nerva, Huelva, España). De Re Metallica. Madrid: Sociedad Española para la Defensa del Patrimonio Geológico y Minero. pp. 13–27. ISSN 1888-8615.
- Delgado, Aquilino; Rivera, Timoteo; Pérez-Macías, Juan Aurelio; Regalado, M.ª de la Cinta (2013). La catalogación del patrimonio minero industrial de la cuenca minera de Riotinto mediante la aplicación del Sistema de Información Geográfico (SIG). De Re Metallica. Madrid: Sociedad Española para la Defensa del Patrimonio Geológico y Minero. pp. 83–95. ISSN 1888-8615.
- Delgado, Aquilino (2021). Cuenca minera de Riotinto (Huelva), paisaje hecho a mano (PDF). I simposio anual de patrimonio natural y cultural. ICOMOS España. José Luis Lerma, Alfonso Maldonado, Víctor M. López-Menchero (coord.). Universidad Politécnica de Valencia. pp. 1–7.
- Domínguez, Consuelo (2019). Hugh M. Matheson: un victoriano en las minas de Rio Tinto (in Spanish). Universidad de Huelva. ISBN 9788417776121.
- Ferrero Blanco, María Dolores (2003). La huelga minera de Río Tinto de 1920. El diagnóstico del conflicto según Sir Rhys Williams, enviado de los Rostschild (PDF). Revista de Estudios Regionales. Universidades Públicas de Andalucía. pp. 249–303. ISSN 0213-7585.
- Flores Caballero, Manuel (2007). Los Rothschild y la venta de las minas de Río Tinto en el proceso de la Ley General de Desamortización de Madoz (in Spanish). Universidad de Huelva.
- Flores Caballero, Manuel (2011). Las fuerzas de la revolución industrial en la fiebre minera del XIX (in Spanish). Editorial Fundación para la investigación Juan Manuel Flores Jimeno. ISBN 9788493768782.
- Flores Caballero, Manuel (2017). La nacionalización de las minas de Río Tinto y la formación de la compañía española (in Spanish). Huelva: Servicio de publicaciones de la Universidad de Huelva. ISBN 9788493768744.
- Grande Gil, José Antonio (2016). Drenaje ácido de mina en la faja pirítica ibérica: técnicas de estudio e inventario de explotaciones (in Spanish). Universidad de Huelva. ISBN 9788416061549.
- Harvey, Charles E. (1981). The Rio Tinto Company. An economic history of a leading international mining 1873-1954 (in Spanish). Alison Hodge.
- Iglesias, Luis (2019). "La gestión del patrimonio histórico-arqueológico en el proyecto Riotinto de Atalaya Minera". In Juan Aurelio Pérez Macías; Luis Iglesias García (eds.). Investigaciones en el yacimiento romano de Riotinto (Huelva). Universidad de Huelva. pp. 13–44. ISBN 9788417776800.
- León Vela, José; Martínez Roldán, Nieves (2001). La reconversión de áreas industriales obsoletas (in Spanish). Vol. I. Universidad de Sevilla. ISBN 9788447206704.
- Paz Sánchez, José Juan de (2014). Entre el puerto y la mina (I): Antecedentes del movimiento obrero organizado en Huelva (1870-1912) (in Spanish). Huelva: Servicio de Publicaciones de la Universidad de Huelva. ISBN 9788416621675.
- Pérez López, Juan Manuel (2006). El ferrocarril minero de Riotinto. Los ferrocarriles en la provincia de Huelva: Un recorrido por el pasado (in Spanish). Universidad de Huelva. pp. 229–272.
- Pérez López, Juan Manuel (2017). "Situación de los archivos mineros en España. El archivo histórico minero de Fundación Río Tinto". Patrimonio geológico y minero: Una apuesta por el desarrollo local sostenible. At: Emilio Romero Macías (dir.). Universidad de Huelva. pp. 579–592.
- Pérez Macías, Juan Aurelio; Delgado, Aquilino (2007). "La metalla de Riotinto en época julio-claudia". In Juan Aurelio Pérez Macías; Aquilino Delgado Domínguez (eds.). Las minas de Riotinto en época julio-claudia. Universidad de Huelva. pp. 37–184.
- Pérez Macías, Juan Aurelio; Delgado, Aquilino (2012). "Paisaje y territorio de Riotinto en época romana". In María del Mar Zarzalejos Prieto; Patricia Hevia Gómez; Luis Mansilla Plaza (eds.). Paisajes mineros antiguos en la Península Ibérica. Investigaciones recientes y nuevas líneas de trabajo. Madrid: UNED. pp. 47–68. ISBN 9788436266719.
- Ruiz Ballesteros, Esteban (1998). Minería y poder: antropología política en Riotinto (in Spanish). Diputación provincial de Huelva.
- Sobrino, Julián (1998). Arquitectura de la industria en Andalucía (in Spanish). Instituto de Fomento de Andalucía. ISBN 9788487672194.
