= Río Tinto Foundation =

Nonprofit organization of Spain

- Fundación Río Tinto
- Abbreviation: FRT
- Formation: 1987
- Type: Foundation
- Headquarters: Plaza del Museo s/n, Minas de Riotinto, Province of Huelva
- President: María Benjumea
- Website: fundacionriotinto.es

The Río Tinto Foundation (in Spanish: Fundación Río Tinto, FRT) is a Spanish cultural and non-profit institution based in the municipality of Minas de Riotinto, in the province of Huelva. The Foundation's objective is the study and preservation of the industrial heritage of the Río Tinto Company Limited, as well as its recovery in projects that generate added value in the Río Tinto region. The foundation is involved in numerous cultural and recreational initiatives.

== History ==
The foundation was created in 1987 by the Río Tinto Minera Company as a cultural and private institution, of a charitable nature, to take charge of the heritage generated over the decades by the companies that had operated the Rio Tinto Mines. Among the purposes of the FRT were the study of mining and metallurgy, as well as the conservation and restoration of the environmental and patrimonial heritage of the mining basin. To this end, the creation of a Mining Park for cultural, tourist and recreational purposes was foreseen, including the creation of a Mining Museum and the conservation of the Ríotinto railroad. After many years of work by the institution, the recovery of the historic railway line for tourist use, as well as the conservation and restoration of the railway heritage are to its credit. A fundamental part of this work was the launching, in November 1994, of the Tourist Mining Train. The FRT also manages the Riotinto Mining Museum, inaugurated in 1992, and the Mining Historical Archive, which holds the archival funds derived from the business activity of the successive owners of the mines.

== Presidents ==
- Ernest Lluch Martín (1987–1991)
- José Rodríguez de la Borbolla (1991–2002)
- Rafael Benjumea Cabeza de Vaca (2002–2021)
- María Benjumea Cabeza de Vaca (2021–present)

== See also ==
- Riotinto-Nerva mining basin
- Peña del Hierro mine

== Bibliography ==
- Delgado, Aquilino; Campos, Ángel; Fiñana, Francisco (2007). "La recuperación del patrimonio ferroviario llevada a cabo por Fundación Río Tinto. Cuenca minera de Riotinto (Huelva)". Re Metallica (in Spanish). 8 (19–28). Madrid: Sociedad Española para la Defensa del Patrimonio Geológico y Minero. ISSN 1888-8615.
- Fernández, G.; Romero, E. (2003). "Museo minero: eje de la protección y puesta en valor del patrimonio arqueológico en la Cuenca minera de Riotinto (Huelva)". Patrimonio geológico y minero y desarrollo regional (in Spanish) (Isabel Rábano et al. ed.). Madrid: Instituto Geológico y Minero de España: 549–562.
- Pérez, Juan Manuel (2017). "Situación de los archivos mineros en España. El archivo histórico minero de Fundación Río Tinto". Patrimonio geológico y minero: Una apuesta por el desarrollo local sostenible (in Spanish) (Emilio Romero Macías (dir.) ed.). Universidad de Huelva: 579–592.
