= Riotinto Railway =

Spanish railway line operating between 1875 and 1984

Coordinates: 37.682769°N 6.556658°W

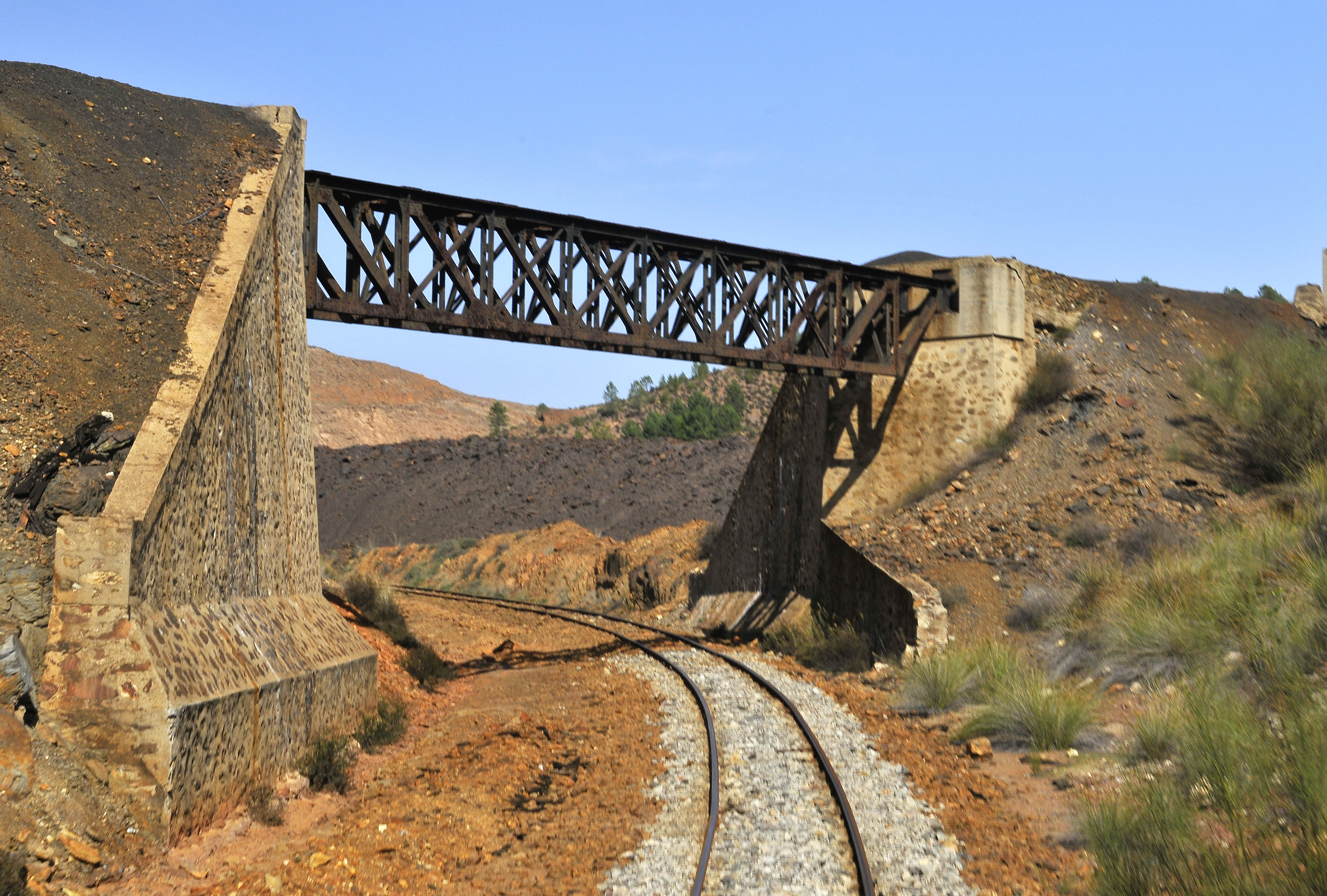
- View of the route under the Gurugú Bridge in 2014

Overview
- Native name: Ferrocarril de Riotinto
- Locale: Huelva, Spain
- Transit type: Rail transport

Operation
- Began operation: 28 July 1875
- Ended operation: 8 February 1984

Technical
- System length: 83.6 km (51.95 mi)
- Track gauge: 1,067 mm (3 ft 6 in)

The Riotinto Railway was a Spanish narrow-gauge railway line, predominantly used for mining and industry, that operated between 1875 and 1984. During this time it became one of the main railways in the province of Huelva, gaining a large fleet of rolling stock.

The railway was built between 1873 and 1875 by the British Rio Tinto Company Limited (RTC), that sought to provide maritime access to the minerals extracted from ore deposits in the Riotinto-Nerva mining basin. For much of its route, the track ran parallel to the course of the Tinto River, although in its last stage it ran alongside the Iberian-gauge Seville-Huelva railway. For over a century, it was one of the most heavily-used mining railways in Spain. Likewise it had a large fleet of cars and engines, to the point of becoming the second largest in the country after the Renfe. The route closed to public traffic in 1984.

After several years the abandoned infrastructure was subject to looting, so in the late 1980s action was taken to recover the historic railway line and return it to service. This work would be carried out in the 1990s, around the time when the popular Tourist Mining Train was introduced. In the 21st century a small 11 km (6.8 mi)-long railway section is kept operational for tourist and recreational purposes. The remaining route has been either abandoned or dismantled.

== History ==
=== Origins and construction ===
Historically, the territory of the Huelva has been rich in ore deposits of various types, as was the case of the Riotinto mines. During the second half of the 19th century, the exploitation of province's various deposits passed into foreign hands, mainly British. Parallel to this process, a network of railway lines was built to connect the mines to the coastal ports, such as the Buitrón railway (1870) or the Tharsis railway (1871). The Riotinto basin, rich in pyrites and copper, was of special interest to the house of Rothschild. After a process that lasted years, the Rothschilds finally bought the ownership of the mines from the state in 1873. The acquisition of the mines was accompanied by a state concession to build a railway line to connect them with the port of Huelva and thus allow the transport of the extracted minerals to the coast. The construction of the railroad began in June 1873 by the Rio Tinto Company. The engineer in charge of designing the layout was George Barclay Bruce.

The construction works were carried out in five different sections simultaneously over two years. The most complicated part of the project was between the Riotinto mines and the municipality of Niebla, a section where the route had to run parallel to the course of the Tinto River. In addition to the private land that the RTC acquired to lay the tracks, the State also ceded land in the public domain and authorized compulsory expropriations for reasons of public utility. The Rio Tinto Company Limited reached an agreement with the operating company of the Buitrón railway for the transportation of construction materials, also using the facilities that this company owned in San Juan del Puerto for the unloading of railway material. The slag resulting from the ancient mining works carried out in Roman times was used as track ballast — because it was abundant in the Riotinto basin.

=== British exploitation ===
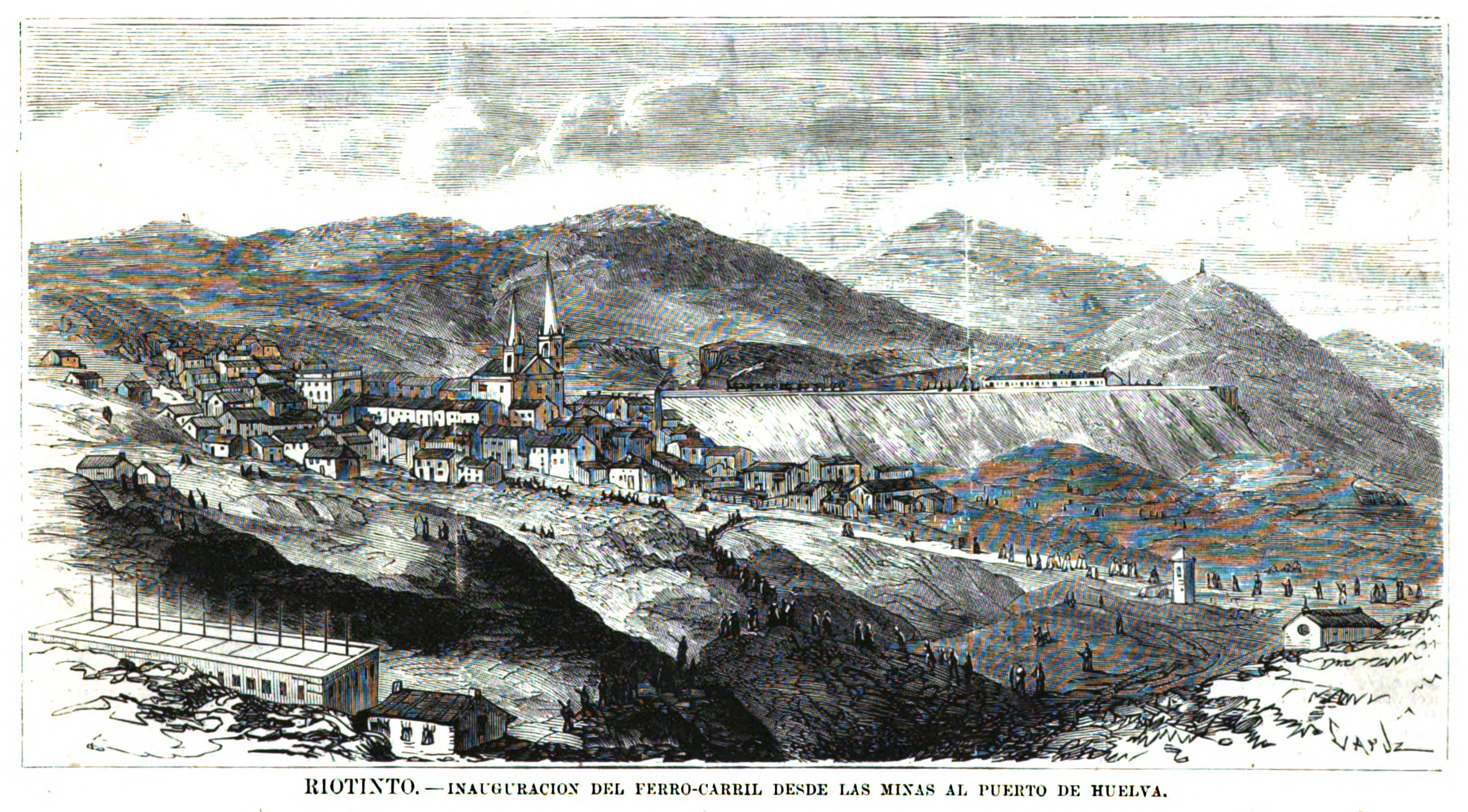
"Riotinto - Inauguration of the railway from the mines to the port of Huelva" - La Ilustración Española y Americana. August 15, 1875.

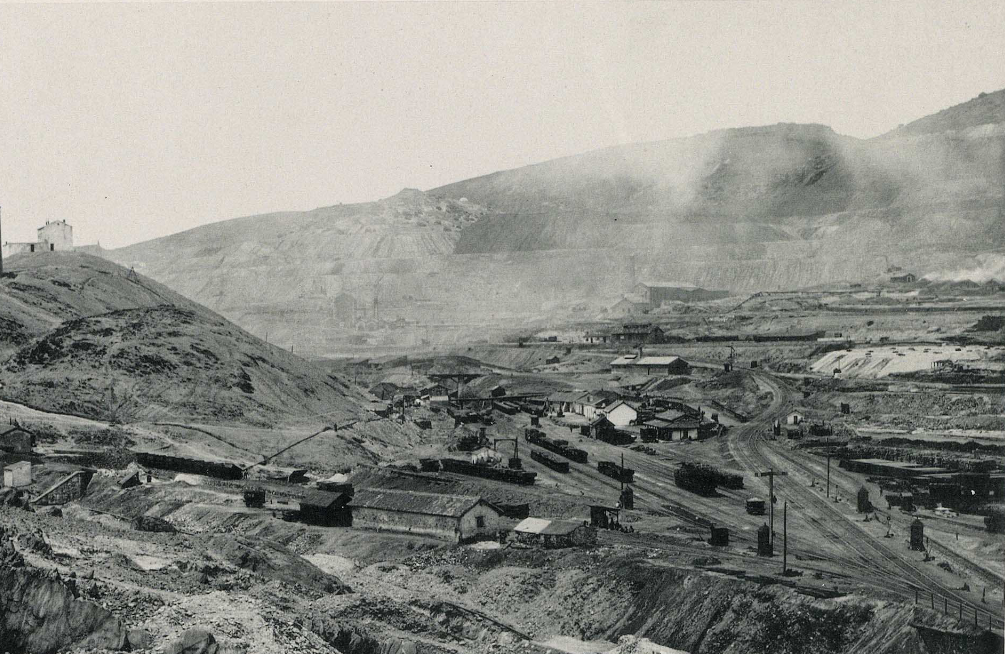
Río Tinto-Estación, in 1892.

The Riotinto railway was officially inaugurated on July 28, 1875, and started operations by early August of the same year. Due to the rush of the RTC for its commissioning, the works proceeded swiftly. Construction was completed three months ahead of schedule and also at a budget cost of 767,190 pounds sterling at the time, a figure lower than expected. A year later, a commercial pier began operating in Huelva, built on the waters of the Odiel river. The infrastructure was made of iron and wood, consisting of three floors and with a length of 226 meters.

The route had a track gauge of 1,067 mm (3 ft 6.0 in), and length of 83,67 kilómetres and had up to a dozen stations. Some branches were later added to the mainline to link it with the area's ore deposits and industrial facilities, a network totalling almost 360 km (220 mi). The track started at the company's mining complex and ran parallel to the course of the Tinto River, until it reached the port of Huelva. In 1896, with the Seville-Huelva line already operational, a junction was built at Las Mallas railway station to carry out transfers between the two lines.

In its early days rail traffic was irregular, since it depended on whether there were ships docked at the port to load ore. Another problem was locomotives getting worn out after many trips between Riotinto and Huelva due to the steep gradient between them. Beginning in 1895, the following system was adopted: locomotives based in Huelva would pull the trains to Gadea train station, where engines from Riotinto would take over for the rest of the journey. Dual traction was also adopted, allowing larger convoys to be moved and increasing the load carried. In 1929 the railway moved 1,740,854 tons of ore and 15,369 tons of cargo, a figure that constituted its historical maximum. It is noteworthy that the start of operations of the Riotinto railway allowed the arrival of certain products from the coastal area and the countryside to the mining basin. This meant a cheapening of these goods, which would translate into an improvement in the living standards of the area's inhabitants.

In 1904, two new branches coming from downtown Riotinto came into service: one that reached Nerva and another that reached Zalamea la Real. Three years earlier, the State had authorized RTC to build the new routes, which sought to provide means of transportation to mine workers living in the towns of Nerva, El Campillo and Zalamea la Real, thus allowing them to continue to travel to and from the mining area. During this time, a total of 85,972 workers and 11,686 individuals (family members), as well as 48 tons of cargo, were transported each month on these branches. However, the operation of the branch lines was financially unprofitable. Between 1883 and 1913, another detour was operational, linking the main line with the facilities of the Peña del Hierro mine.

Throughout its history, the main traffic of the railway consisted in the transport of ore, but the route would eventually be used for passenger traffic after the municipalities in the area requested it. Passenger services began in 1895, going through different stages. Passengers traveled free at first, through a system of passes granted by the company, which caused great unrest among disadvantaged sectors and, after numerous protests, led the RTC to implement a fare system. There were special services, the "workers' trains", which transported technicians and workers from the various towns to their workplaces. These "workers' trains" only ran in the mining area and ran several times a day, both to and from the mine. In addition to occasional trips to Huelva, RTC employees and their families also used the train in summer to travel to the company's beach in Punta Umbría Railway traffic was affected by the strikes of 1913 and 1920, that paralyzed activity in the Riotinto-Nerva mining basin. During the mining strike of 1920 the railway workers began a general strike and the line came to a standstill, with army soldiers arriving in the area having to take charge of its operation.

The growth in traffic experienced by the railway in the early 20th century led the company to introduce a series of modifications to allow dual traction, making it possible for larger convoys to circulate. This increase was up to 35% between 1907 and 1912, so the RTC had to buy new freight cars. There was a project to provide electricity to the general railway in order to save costs, although it was not implemented due to the outbreak of the First World War. However, what was carried out during this period, between 1915 and 1918, was a renewal of the rail track using 65 pounds rails manufactured by the Altos Hornos de Vizcaya. The track was overhauled for the second time in 1935, although the process would take more than twenty years.

In 1931, the Riotinto Railway got a major boost with the arrival of British engineer George Rice, who was considered an expert in railways. Under the direction of Rice, important reforms in the main track and in the factory works (tunnels, bridges) were undertaken during the following years to facilitate the circulation of more powerful locomotives on the track. At the same time, two Garrat locomotives — that RTC had acquired some time before to boost traction — also started operations.

=== Spanish exploitation ===
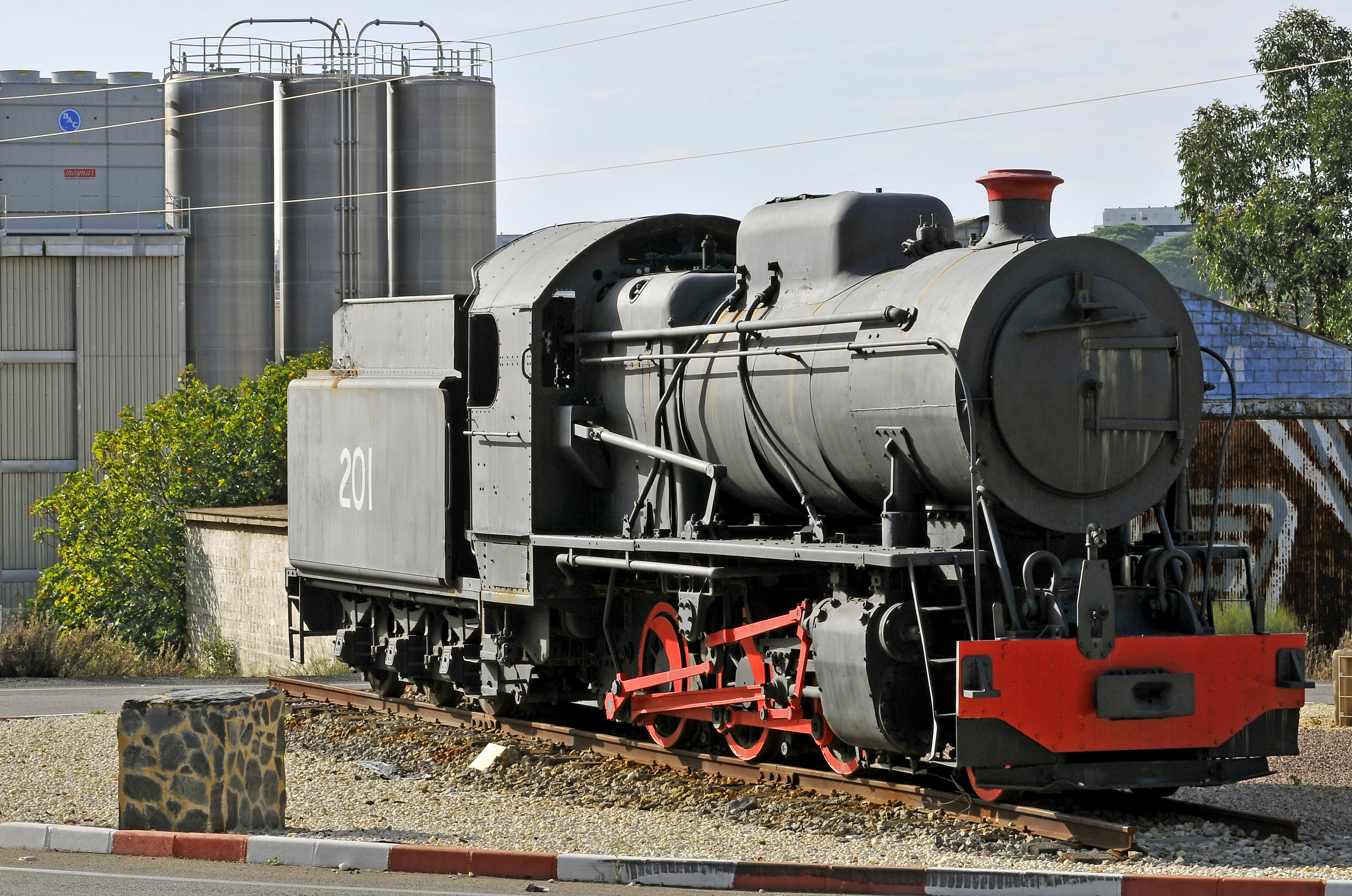
View of the locomotive No. 201, "Mogul" type, currently preserved in Minas de Riotinto. This series was widely used in traction work.

In 1954, the management and ownership of the railway was transferred to the Compañía Española de Minas de Río Tinto (CEMRT), following the acquisition of the Rio Tinto mines and its facilities by Spanish capitalists. In 1970, management was taken over by the newly created Unión Explosivos Río Tinto (ERT) group. (Note: The Explosivos Río Tinto group would create in 1978 a subsidiary, Río Tinto Minera, which would take over the railway operation. —Arenas Posadas (2017), p. 125)

Due to the large volume of traffic it carried, the Riotinto Railway had a large fleet of vehicles and engines, becoming the second largest in Spain after the RENFE. In the mid-1950s it had 120 locomotives, about 3,000 large-capacity freight cars or wagons, and various auxiliary material, such as cranes. In order to introduce new engine material, the RTC had acquired new Mogul type steam locomotives, colloquially known as "Gildas", which arrived in Spain in 1954. Although the use of steam locomotives prevailed for most of the railway's existence, diesel traction would eventually be introduced in an attempt to modernize the fleet. In this sense, the purchase in the 1960s of a Fried-Krupp tractor and several Creusot-type diesel locomotives stood out. To this was added the past acquisition of a series of pantograph electric locomotives for subway operation in the tunnel no. 16 of Naya and in the Filón Norte.

In 1968, the Riotinto Railway passenger services were closed, as well as the "workers' trains" that transported employees to their workplaces. This was due to the widespread use of the automobile as a means of private transportation and the loss-making nature of these services for the owner of the railway. A few years later, in 1978, the branches going to Nerva and Zalamea la Real were closed for good.

In 1974, the route between Las Mallas and Huelva was closed to traffic, leaving the infrastructure inactive. From then on, the trains coming from the mines would reach the Las Mallas complex, where the ore would be loaded onto trucks and later transported from there to Huelva — destined for the new facilities of the Chemical park of Huelva. As a result of the new situation, a year later the Odiel river piers stopped operating, and this infrastructure was also abandoned. Starting in 1975, steam locomotives were definitively removed from traction work on the line, a role that was taken over by diesel locomotives. In May 1975 and April 1979, two new Alco model diesel engines were acquired (No. 911 and No. 912), which ended up performing well.

=== Decommissioning and abandonment ===
During its final years, the railway traffic experienced such a decline that its exploitation ceased to be economically profitable for the owning company. Although several studies were carried out by Río Tinto Minera in order to keep the railway in service, eventually it did not materialize. The line was closed to traffic in February 1984, after the last regular service had been carried out. On 8 February 1984, a train pulled by locomotive no. 911 ran on a route from Las Mallas to Riotinto, in order to remove empty wagons. After the closure of the line, the facilities were abandoned and underwent uncontrolled dismantling, affecting both the railway tracks and the rolling stock parked in the locomotive depot at Zarandas. Many stations on the line were seriously deteriorated, while the historic facilities of Río Tinto-Estación and Huelva ended up disappearing for the most part after being dismantled. In addition, some sections of the old line were largely dismantled, with the removal of tracks and crossties.

=== Restoration for tourist use ===
Since the late 1980s, several initiatives were carried out to recover the railway infrastructures and stop their deterioration. In this context, the company Río Tinto Minera transferred its historical heritage assets to the Fundación Río Tinto (FRT), an entity created in 1987 that carried out many of these tasks. The railway line became part of the heritage of the FRT. A study was carried out in 1990 on the possibilities of using the mining line for tourist purposes, although it was rejected due to its high cost. A second project, dated 1993, foresaw the rehabilitation of the railway line through several phases. Following these postulates, the recovery of the rolling stock and infrastructure was carried out, which included the restoration of the tracks and the rehabilitation of stations such as Zarandas-Naya or Los Frailes. Since the former Río Tinto-Estación facilities had been dismantled, the rehabilitation of the railway Since the former Río Tinto-Estación facilities had been dismantled, the rehabilitation of the trackbed began near the former Talleres Mina, erecting a new railway enclosure in order to accommodate visitors and trains.

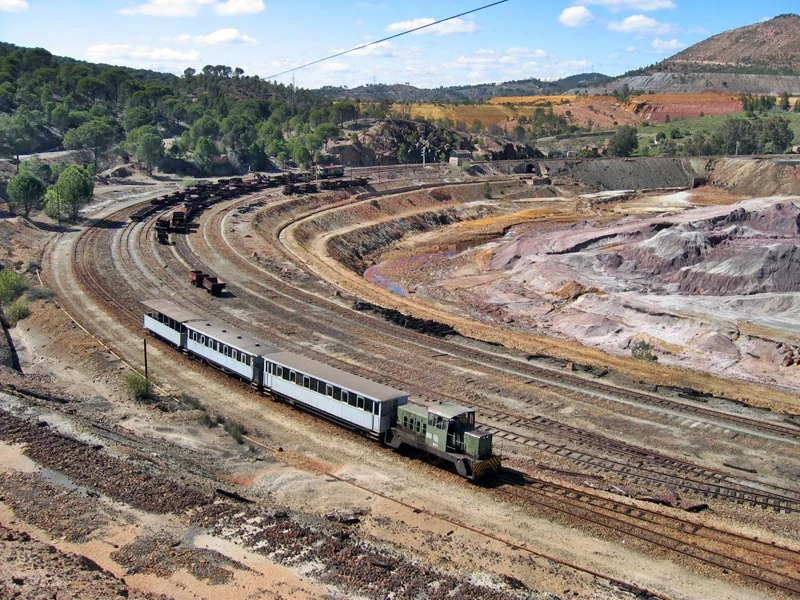
The Tourist Train passing through Zarandas-Naya, in 2007.

These operations allowed the partial reopening of the Riotinto Wailway in November 1994. A small section between Talleres Mina and Zarandas was initially reopened for service; in February 1997, the operating track was extended to Los Frailes station. From the historical rolling stock that was recovered during those years — including two steam locomotives — the Tourist Mining Train was formed, which offers recreational services along the old railway route. In turn, some locomotives and wagons were taken to be exhibited at the Riotinto Mining Museum.

In total, about eleven kilometers of track were restored to service. A very different scenario applied to the rest of the old railway line. The route between Los Frailes and Manantiales remained untouched; although its recovery was initially planned, over the years it has not happened. The track between Las Mallas and Huelva has been dismantled for the most part, although some stations and bridges have remained unscathed. The track between the stations of Manantiales and Las Mallas has also disappeared. Much of this infrastructure dismantling can be attributed to the action of illegal scrap metal dealers, many of which proliferated after its abandonment during the 1980s. It should also be noted that an old section of the railway has been rehabilitated for cycling and pedestrian use, now called Vía verde de Riotinto, which runs between Zalamea la Real and Minas de Riotinto.

== Layout and characteristics ==
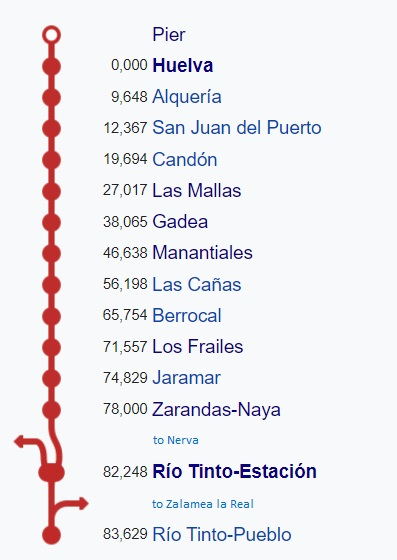
Railway route map (c. 1960)

The Riotinto Railway, which used a metric gauge, came to have a main line of more than 80 kilometers in length. Throughout the route, the single track was predominant, although between Río Tinto-Estación and Marín there was a dual track section due to the intense traffic. The main line ran parallel to the course of the Tinto River, with a winding route and an average gradient of 1.176%, although in its last section it ran over a flat and smooth area. In any case, the orographical difficulties of the area led to the construction of up to 8 bridges and 5 tunnels, as well as numerous trenches.

Initially, a dozen stations or sidings were built to regulate the line's traffic, to which new ones would be added later with the construction of the branch lines. (Note: These were Nerva, Río Tinto-Pueblo, El Valle, El Campillo and Zalamea, which became operative at the beginning of the 20th century.) Among all of them, the Río Tinto-Estación complex stood out, which constituted an important railway junction where the tracks that went to Nerva and Zalamea la Real converged. The general workshops and a large shunting yard were located in Huelva; the traffic of the entire network was also controlled from this station. Several signal cabins were also built along the route to control switches and signals. Currently, only a section of about 11 kilometers between the stations of Talleres Mina and Los Frailes remains operational, while the main railway facilities of the line are located in the complex of Zarandas-Naya. (Note: The Zarandas-Naya area houses the locomotive depot, as well as a good part of the railway rolling stock preserved by the Río Tinto Foundation.)

== Rolling stock ==
The railway's rolling stock was one of the largest of all Spanish railways in its time. Throughout its history, it employed a total of up to 143 steam locomotives, 9 diesel traction locomotives and as many electric locomotives — the latter destined for subsurface travel in the mines. It had about 1,300 wagons of different types and about 2,000 mine cars for the transport of minerals and goods. The RTC also acquired 36 passenger cars for passenger traffic, as well as some railcars. Since 1987, the Río Tinto Foundation has managed to preserve part of the legacy railway heritage. Nowadays, steam locomotives no. 14 and 51, as well as diesel tractors no. 931, 932, and 933 remain in working order.

== See also ==
- History of rail transport in Spain
- Madrid, Zaragoza and Alicante railway
- Rio Tinto Company Limited
- Riotinto-Nerva mining basin
- Tharsis-La Zarza mining basin
- Tharsis railway line
- Buitrón railway
- Tourist Mining Train
- Peña del Hierro mine

== Bibliography ==
- Arenas Posadas, Carlos (2017). "Riotinto, el declive de un mito minero (1954-2003)". Revista de Historia Industrial (in Spanish) (69). Barcelona: Universidad de Barcelona: 109–142. ISSN 1132-7200.
- Amoluc (2012). Huelva, el patrimonio perdido. Seville: ASAF. pp. 31–34.
- Delgado, Aquilino; Campos, Ángel; Fiñana, Francisco (2007). La recuperación del patrimonio ferroviario llevada a cabo por Fundación Río Tinto. Cuenca minera de Riotinto (Huelva). Madrid: Sociedad Española para la Defensa del Patrimonio Geológico y Minero. pp. 19–28. ISSN 1888-8615.
- Delgado, Aquilino; Campos, Ángel; Narbona, Saúl (2009). The Río Tinto railway. Breve reseña histórica (PDF). At: Aquilino Delgado Domínguez. Huelva: Universidad de Huelva. pp. 17–26.
- Delgado, Aquilino; Campos, Ángel (2009). El ferrocarril turístico minero. El renacimiento del Río Tinto Railway. At: Aquilino Delgado Domínguez. Universidad de Huelva. pp. 53–54.
- Delgado, Aquilino; Regalado, María de la Cinta (2012). Catálogo del patrimonio minero industrial de la mina de Peña de Hierro (Nerva, Huelva, España). Madrid: Sociedad Española para la Defensa del Patrimonio Geológico y Minero. pp. 13–27. ISSN 1888-8615.
- Delgado, Aquilino; Rivera, Timoteo; Pérez-Macías, Juan Aurelio; Regalado, M.ª de la Cinta (2013). La catalogación del patrimonio minero industrial de la cuenca minera de Riotinto mediante la aplicación del Sistema de Información Geográfico (SIG). Madrid: Sociedad Española para la Defensa del Patrimonio Geológico y Minero. pp. 83–95. ISSN 1888-8615.
- Flores Caballero, Manuel (2007). Los Rothschild y la venta de las minas de Río Tinto en el proceso de la Ley General de Desamortización de Madoz. Servicio de pub. de la Universidad de Huelva. ISBN 9788416872725.
- Flores Caballero, Manuel (2011). Las fuerzas de la revolución industrial en la fiebre minera del XIX. Editorial Fundación para la investigación Juan Manuel Flores Jimeno. ISBN 9788493768782.
- Flores Caballero, Manuel (2017). La nacionalización de las minas de Río Tinto y la formación de la compañía española (in Spanish). Huelva: Servicio de publicaciones de la Universidad de Huelva. ISBN 9788493768744.
- León Vela, José; Martínez Roldán, Nieves (2001). La reconversión de áreas industriales obsoletas. Vol. I. Universidad de Sevilla. ISBN 9788447206704.
- Márquez Trigo, José (2012). Historia taurina de Minas de Riotinto. Huelva.
- Mojarro Bayo, Ana María (2010). La historia del puerto de Huelva (1873-1930). Servicio de publicaciones de la Universidad de Huelva/Puerto de Huelva. ISBN 9788416621156.
- Paz Sánchez, José Juan de (2018). Entre el puerto y la mina (III). Ocaso del movimiento obrero organizado en Huelva y Riotinto (1916-1923). Servicio de Publicaciones de la Universidad de Huelva. ISBN 9788417066574.
- Peña Guerrero, María Antonia (2006). Guillermo Sundheim y el ferrocarril, un modelo de inversor extranjero en el sector ferroviario español. At: Emilio Romero Macías (dir.). Universidad de Huelva. pp. 51–77. ISBN 9788416061730.
- Pérez López, Juan Manuel (2006). El ferrocarril minero de Riotinto. At: Emilio Romero Macías. Universidad de Huelva. pp. 229–272.
- Pérez López, Juan Manuel; Romero, Emilio; Carrasco, Iván (2006). Patrimonio ferroviario: nuevos usos y puesta en valor. At: Emilio Romero Macías. Universidad de Huelva. pp. 527–548.
- Pérez Macías, Juan Aurelio; Delgado, Aquilino (2012). Paisaje y territorio de Riotinto en época romana. At: María del Mar Zarzalejos Prieto, Patricia Hevia Gómez, Luis Mansilla Plaza. Madrid: UNED. pp. 47–68. ISBN 9788436266719.
- Rábano, Isabel; Manteca, Ignacio; García, Cristóbal (2003). Patrimonio geológico y minero y desarrollo regional. Madrid: Instituto Geológico y Minero de España. ISBN 9788478404971.
- Romero Macías, Emilio; Ruiz Ballesteros, Esteban; Pérez López, Juan Manuel; Aguilera Collado, Elena; Aguilera Carrasco, Rafael (2003). Informe BIC sobre la Cuenca Minera de Riotinto para su declaración como Sitio Histórico. Sevilla: Instituto Andaluz del Patrimonio Histórico. pp. 43–50. ISSN 1136-1867.
