= Riotinto Mining Museum =

Museum in Minas de Riotinto, Huelva, Spain

Coordinates: 37°41′37″N 6°35′48″W

Riointo Mining Museum
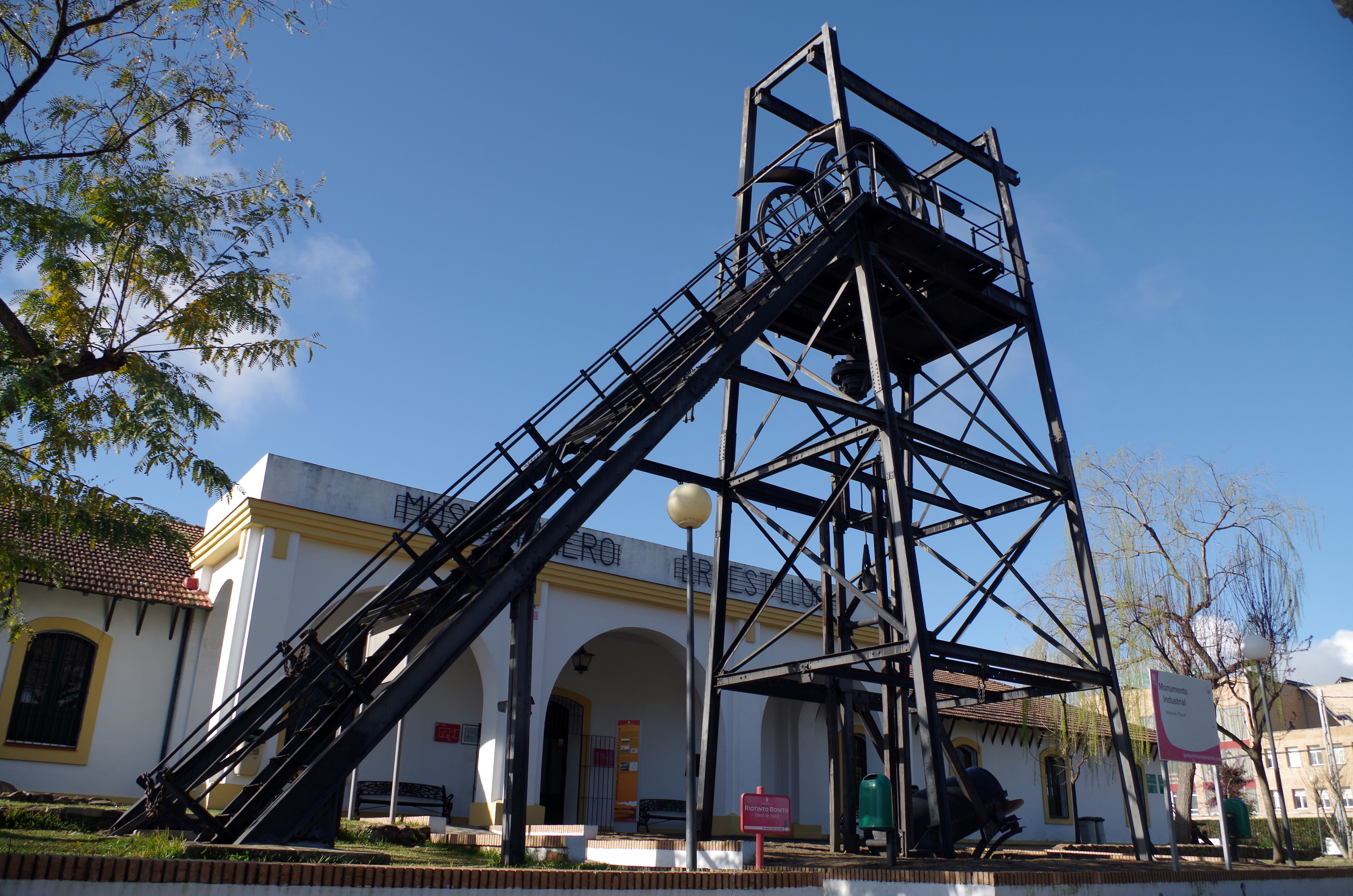
- Riointo Mining Museum
- Established: 1992; 34 years ago
- Location: Minas de Riotinto, Spain
- Director: Aquilino Delgado
- CEO: Río Tinto Foundation

Riotinto Mining Museum is a museum located in the Spanish municipality of Minas de Riotinto, in the province of Huelva, which is dedicated to mining activity in the area and its history. The facilities were inaugurated in 1992 and are managed by the Rio Tinto Foundation. It has an important collection ranging from archaeological pieces to mining machinery and railroad locomotives.

The Museum building is the former mining hospital of the Rio Tinto Company Limited.

== History ==
The building that houses the museum was originally designed in 1921 as a hospital for the Rio Tinto Company Limited (RTC) staff, and was used for that purpose between 1927 and 1983. (Note: At the beginning of 1984, the new Hospital comarcal de Riotinto was inaugurated, which replaced the mining hospital.) In 1970 the south pavilion of the building was converted into social security.

In 1987, the Rio Tinto Foundation was created, whose objectives included the creation of a mining museum. In this context, the Rio Tinto corporation offered to cede the building of the former RTC hospital to house the headquarters of the planned museum. In 1988 the transfer of ownership took place, and two years later the restoration and rehabilitation of the complex began. The transfer of various historical materials also took place. The facilities opened their doors to the public in 1992, as part of a series of initiatives aimed at setting up the so-called Riotinto Mining Park.

== Collections ==
The museum has sixteen thematic rooms whose historical themes range from prehistory to the end of the 20th century, coinciding with the cessation of activity that the Riotinto mines experienced at that time. Among the material on display are various collections of mining instruments and tools, some from the Roman period, archaeological remains, mining machinery, a collection of minerals from the Iberian Pyrite Belt, etc. In the basement of the museum there is a reproduction of a subway mine from the Roman period, in a commitment to interpretation. Another of its rooms is dedicated to the historic Riotinto railway and has on display a variety of material, including several steam locomotives. (Note: In 1973 the Explosivos Rio Tinto group - heir to the former Rio Tinto Company Limited - had already established a railway museum from the rolling stock it owned to commemorate the centenary of the line.8 This museum, located in the locomotive depot of Rio Tinto-Estación (Cocheras Mina), had among its holdings several historic steam locomotives.)

=== Image gallery ===
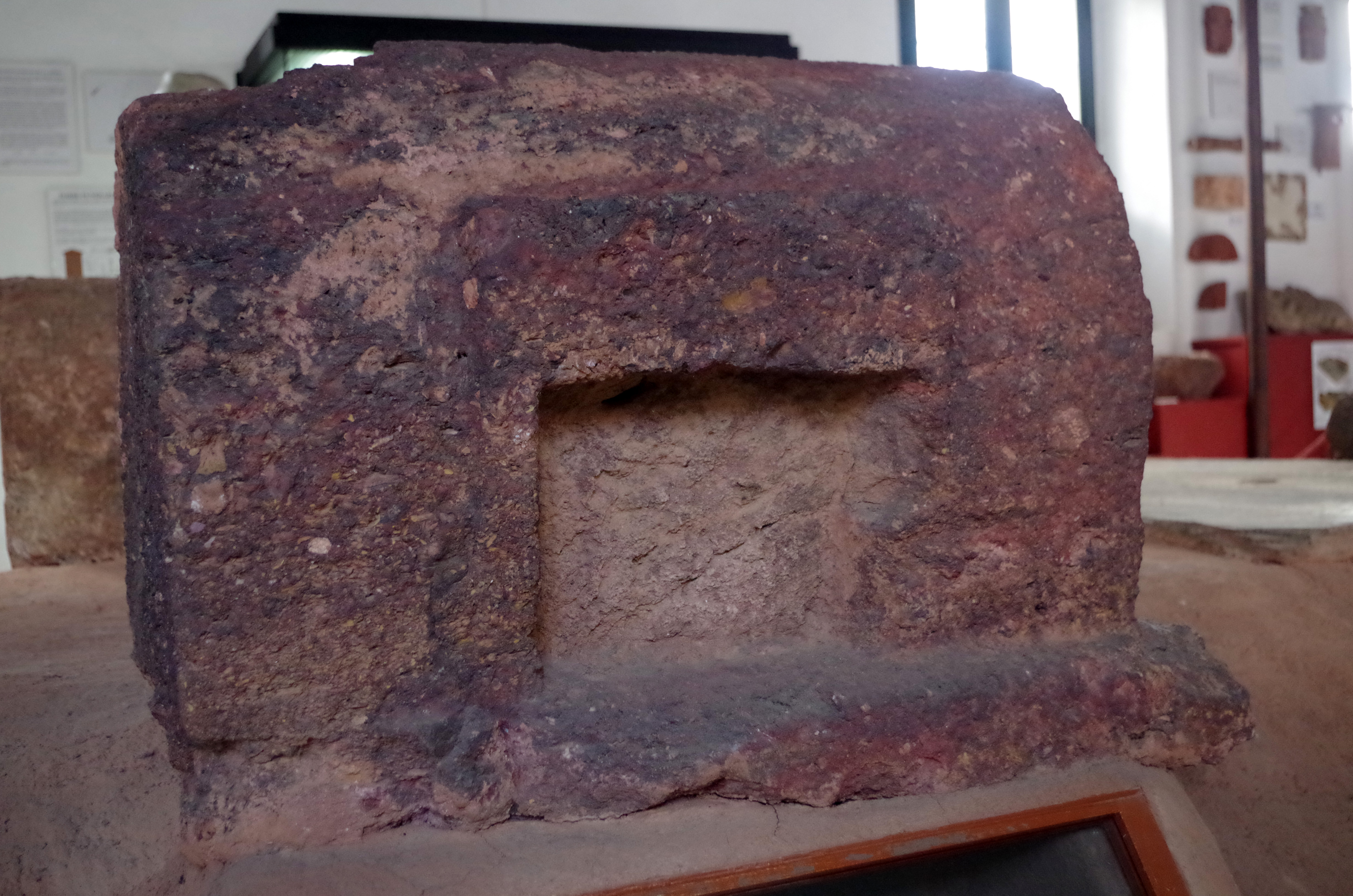

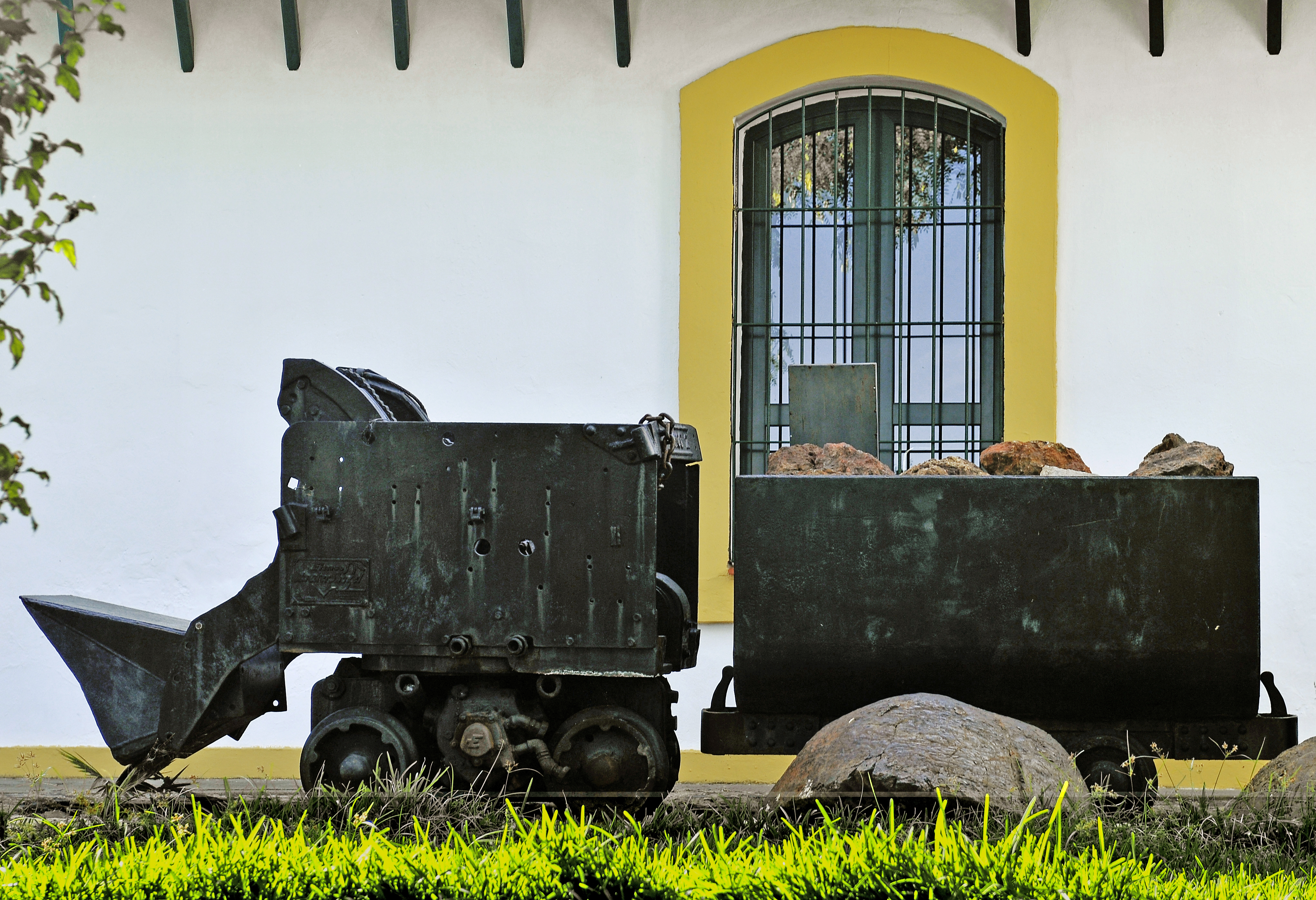

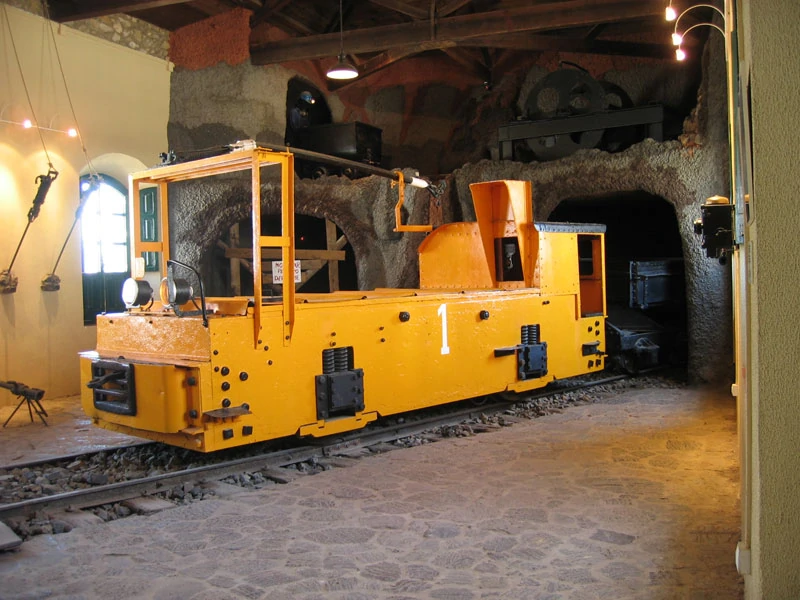

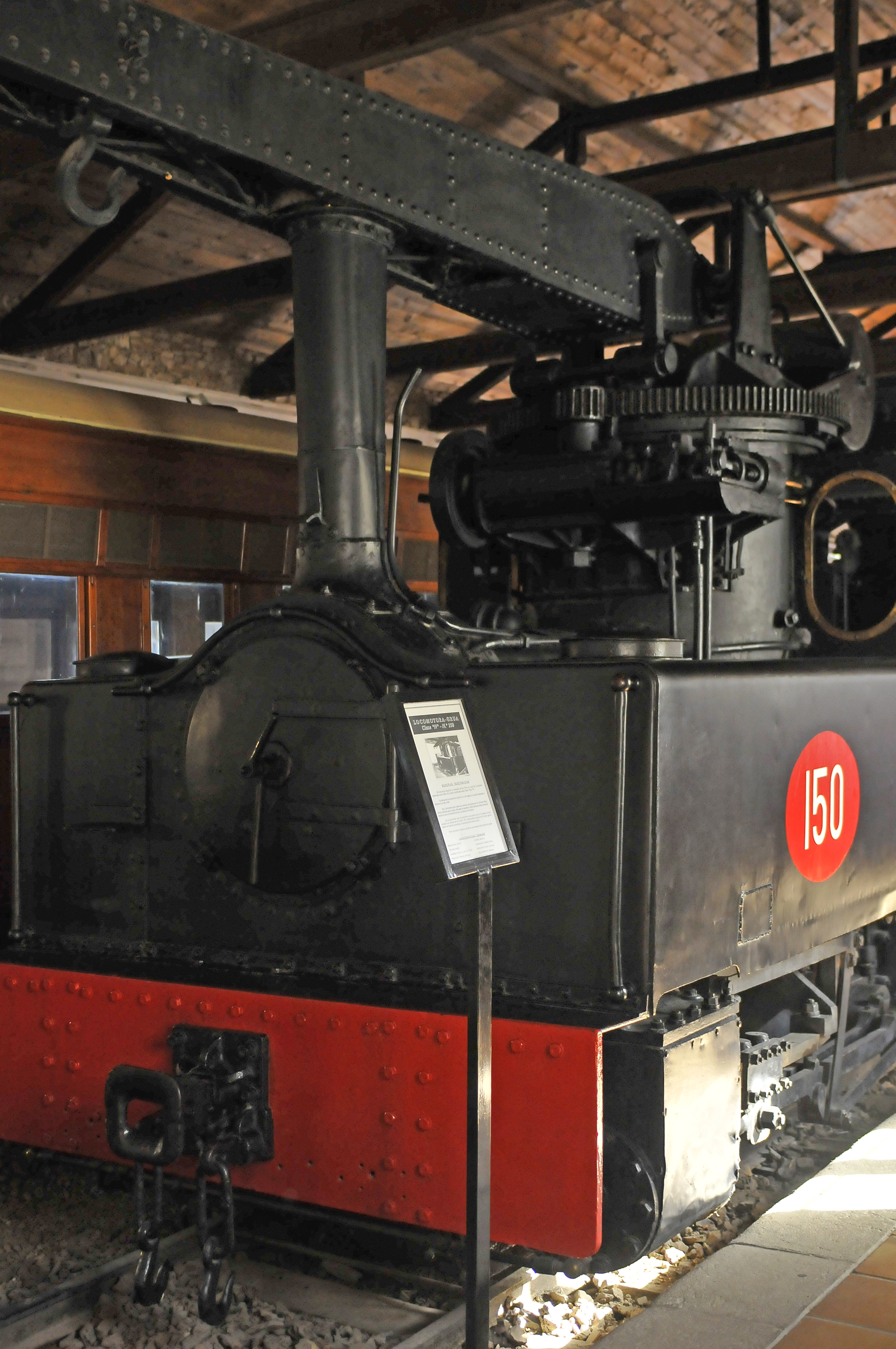

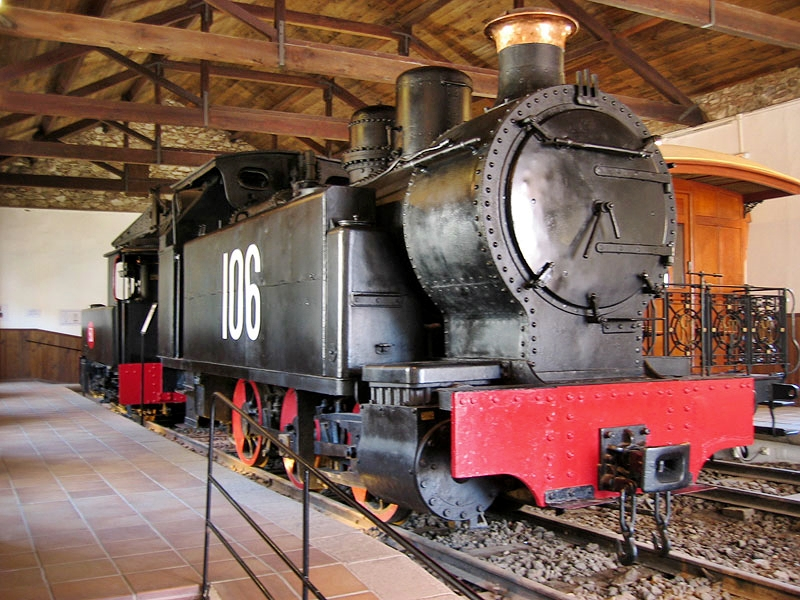

== See also ==
- Compañía Española de Minas de Río Tinto
- Riotinto-Nerva mining basin

== Bibliography ==
- Delgado, Aquilino; Campos, Ángel; Fiñana, Francisco (2007). «La recuperación del patrimonio ferroviario llevada a cabo por Fundación Río Tinto. Cuenca minera de Riotinto (Huelva)». De Re Metallica (8) (Madrid: Sociedad Española para la Defensa del Patrimonio Geológico y Minero). pp. 19–28. ISSN 1888-8615.
- Feria, Diego José; Guerra, José Eugenio (2012). «La enfermería británica y postbritánica en el hospital de Riotinto (1873-1983)». Cultura de los cuidados. Revista de Enfermería y Humanidades (32) (Alicante: Universidad de Alicante). pp. 59–67. ISSN 1888-8615.
- Fernández, G.; Romero, E. (2003). «Museo minero: eje de la protección y puesta en valor del patrimonio arqueológico en la Cuenca minera de Riotinto (Huelva)». En: Isabel Rábano et al. (ed.). Patrimonio geológico y minero y desarrollo regional (Madrid: Instituto Geológico y Minero de España): 549–562.
- García, Francisco Javier; Delgado, Aquilino; Felicidades, Jesús (2013). «El turismo en la cuenca minera de Riotinto». Cuadernos de turismo (31) (Murcia: Universidad de Murcia). pp. 129–152. ISSN 1139-7861.
- Pérez Macías, Juan Aurelio; Delgado, Aquilino (2007). «La metalla de Riotinto en época julio-claudia». En: Juan Aurelio Pérez Macías, Aquilino Delgado Domínguez (eds.). Las minas de Riotinto en época julio-claudia (Universidad de Huelva): 37–184.
