= Tharsis (disambiguation) =

Tharsis is a Volcanic Plateau on Mars, sometimes called the Tharsis Bulge; the name is a greco-roman transliteration of the biblical Tarshish.

Tharsis may also refer to:

== Places ==
=== Mars ===
- Tharsis quadrangle, a quadrangle map of Mars
- Tharsis Tholus, a volcano on Mars
- Tharsis Montes, three large shield volcanoes on Mars

=== Spain ===
- Tharsis-La Zarza mining basin, a Spanish mining area colloquially known as the Tharsis mines
- Tharsis, Huelva, a village in Andalusia, Spain

== Industry ==
- Tharsis railway line, a former industrial railway in Spain
- Tharsis Sulphur and Copper Company Limited, a former British mining company that operated in Spain

== Arts ==
- Tharsis (video game), a 2016 strategy video game developed by Choice Provisions
- Reges Tharsis, a Latin motet and antiphon title

== Zoology ==
- Tharsis (fish), an extinct genus of late Jurassic fish
