= Compañía Española de Minas de Tharsis =

Former mining company of Spain

- Spanish Mining Company of Tharsis
- Formation: 1978
- Type: S.A.
- Purpose: Mining
- Headquarters: Huelva, Tharsis
- Products: Pyrite

The Compañía Española de Minas de Tharsis was a Spanish (Note: It is also cited as the "Compañía Española de Azufre y Cobre de Tharsis" (Sáez, Donaire y Moreno, 2017, p. 99).) company belonging to the mining sector, whose activity was developed mainly in the Tharsis-La Zarza mining basin. It was born as heir to the former British company that had operated the Tharsis mines since the mid-19th century. The company was active between 1978 and 1995, ceasing operations due to the crisis that the sector was going through at that time.

== History ==
=== Creation and early years ===
Since the second half of the 19th century, the Tharsis Sulphur and Copper Company Limited, a British-owned company, had operated a series of mines in the Tharsis-La Zarza mining basin to extract pyrites and other minerals. By 1970 the deposits and facilities in the area began to pass into Spanish domain. In 1972 the company Cros absorbed part of its assets in the Tharsis mines, settling in the region. These changes took place in a context in which foreign capital had mostly left the mining operations in the province of Huelva. In 1978 the "Compañía Española de las Minas de Tharsis" was incorporated. After a complex purchase process, the transfer of assets and properties was not finally closed until June 30, 1979. The new company maintained the traditional operations of mineral extraction and transfer, although in the 1980s it diversified its activities.

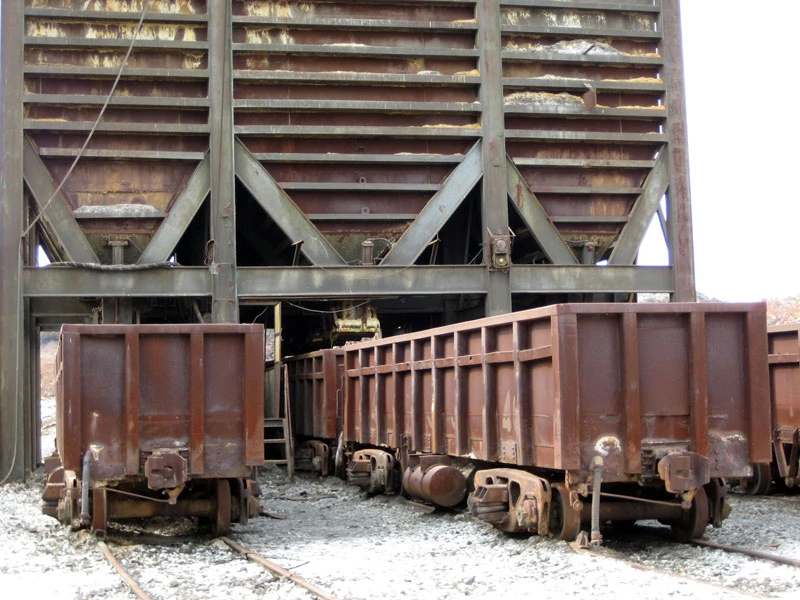
View of the ore loading dock at the old Tharsis station, which served the North Lode.

A considerable part of the pyrite production began to be destined to the Chemical Park of Huelva, where several industrial plants operated, which were abundantly nourished by pyrites. Due to this circumstance, the RENFE company set up a link that connected the Gibraleón-Ayamonte line with the Tharsis railroad and reached the Corrales station. Through this improvised railway route, pyrite shipments could be sent to the Chemical Park in a much more direct way. By 1987 the Tharsis company was the main pyrite seller in Spain, with a 42.7% share of the national market. During those years its main customer was Fosfórico Español, (Note: During 1987, for example, Fosfórico Español acquired 422,303 tons of pyrite from the Tharsis mines (Ferrero Blanco, 2000, p. 260).) although other partners, such as Cros and Empresa Nacional de Fertilizantes, also stood out. The position of the mining company was even greater in terms of exports, since 97% of the Spanish pyrite destined abroad came from Tharsis.

Those years coincided with the decline of the Riotinto mines and other exploitations in the province, as a result of the serious crisis that Huelva's mining industry was going through. The owner of Tharsis was also affected by the situation and had to face several labor conflicts. However, this was not an obstacle for the company to continue diversifying its business. In 1987 it took control of the company San Telmo Ibérica Minera and acquired some mining concessions in the Valdelamusa area. Another initiative of that time was developed in the historic Filón Sur deposit, where there were gossan reserves with a great wealth of gold and silver. The Tharsis company formed a subsidiary company with the British Centurion Corporation to treat the gossan extracted in this area.

=== Final stage ===
At the beginning of the 1990s the company's economic situation had worsened considerably due to external factors such as the fall in prices on the international market. In 1991 the exploitation of the La Zarza deposits ceased. The company's main mining activity was concentrated in the Filón Norte area of Tharsis, while Filón Sur was sold to a Canadian corporation. Since 1993 the mineral was no longer exported by sea to foreign countries, limiting its customers to the companies operating in the Chemical Park of Huelva. The continuous deficits made the business unsustainable, so the company ended up ceasing its activities in December 1995. Compañía Española de Minas de Tharsis was declared bankrupt on April 15, 1996, after which it went into liquidation. The workers formed instead a labor corporation, Nueva Tharsis, which received the necessary assets to continue mining activities.

== Organization and facilities ==
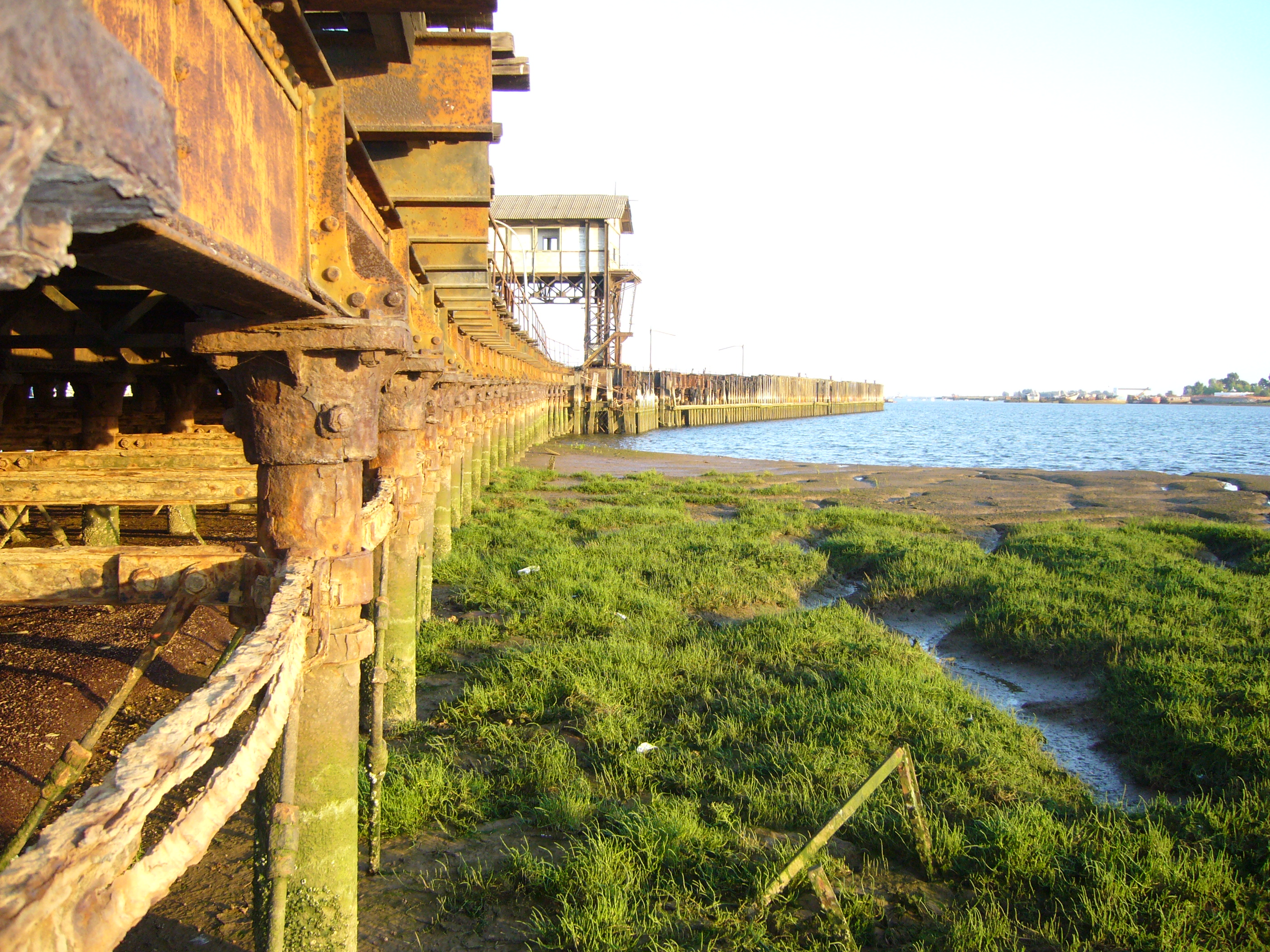
View of the dock on the Odiel River, now abandoned.

The administrative offices of the company were located in the nucleus of the Pueblo Nuevo de Tharsis, which had once housed the British colony. On the other hand, the company had its headquarters in the city of Huelva, located at No. 2, Alameda de Sundheim, while in Madrid it had a branch office.

A part of the company's activities were carried out in the North Tharsis Lode, where there were numerous facilities: workshops, ore loading dock, offices, etc. Another important part of the exploitations was located in La Zarza. The ore for export was exported through the Huelva estuary by means of a dock. All this network of facilities was linked together by a narrow-gauge railway line, the so-called Tharsis railroad, which linked the mines with the Odiel river. An ore crushing plant and a railway classification station were located in Corrales.

== Archive collections ==
At present, the company's documentary collections are under the custody of the Tharsis Mines Historical Archive.

== Bibliography ==
- Carrasco, Iván (1999). "La minería en Andalucía: situación actual y perspectivas". Demófilo. Revista de cultura tradicional (in Spanish) (32). Seville: Fundación Machado: 103–116.
- Ferrero Blanco, María Dolores (2000). "Un modelo de minería contemporánea: Huelva, del colonialismo a la mundialización". Universidad de Huelva (in Spanish).
- Grande Gil, José Antonio (2016). Drenaje ácido de mina en la faja pirítica ibérica: técnicas de estudio e inventario de explotaciones (in Spanish). Universidad de Huelva.
- Llorente Gómez, Emilio (1991). "Minería química". Instituto Tecnológico Geominero (in Spanish). Madrid.
- López Pamo, Enrique (2009). Cortas mineras inundadas de la Faja Pirítica: inventario e hidroquímica (in Spanish). Madrid: Instituto Geológico y Minero de España.
- Pérez López, Juan Manuel (2006). "Ferrocarriles y minas. Los sectores de inversión de los capitales extranjeros". Los ferrocarriles en la provincia de Huelva: Un recorrido por el pasado (in Spanish) (159–176). Emilio Romero Macías (dir.). Universidad de Huelva.
- —— (2017). "Situación de los archivos mineros en España. El archivo histórico minero de Fundación Río Tinto". Patrimonio geológico y minero: Una apuesta por el desarrollo local sostenible (in Spanish). Emilio Romero Macías (dir.). Universidad de Huelva: 579–592.
- Pérez López, Juan Manuel; Romero, Emilio; Carrasco, Iván (2006). "Patrimonio ferroviario: nuevos usos y puesta en valor". Los ferrocarriles en la provincia de Huelva: Un recorrido por el pasado (in Spanish). Emilio Romero Macías (dir.). Universidad de Huelva: 527–548.
- Sáez, Reinaldo; Donaire, Teodosio; Moreno, Carmen (2017). "Geología de la Faja pirítica ibérica: una ventana al infierno paleozoico". Geología de la provincia de Huelva (in Spanish). Reinaldo Sáez, Carmen Moreno, Gabriel R. Almodóvar (eds.). Universidad de Huelva: 87–110.
- Sánchez, Francisco (2006). "El ferrocarril Tharsis-Río Odiel". Los ferrocarriles en la provincia de Huelva: Un recorrido por el pasado (in Spanish). Emilio Romero Macías (dir.). Universidad de Huelva: 207–227.
