= Tharsis-La Zarza mining basin =

Spanish mining area located in Huelva

37°35′23.91″N 7°7′2″W

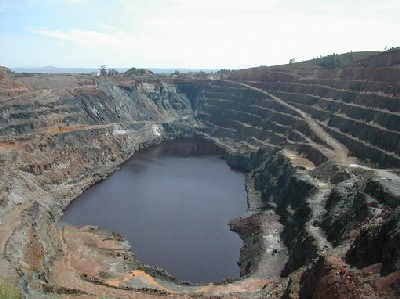
View of the old Filón Norte mines, next to the core of Tharsis

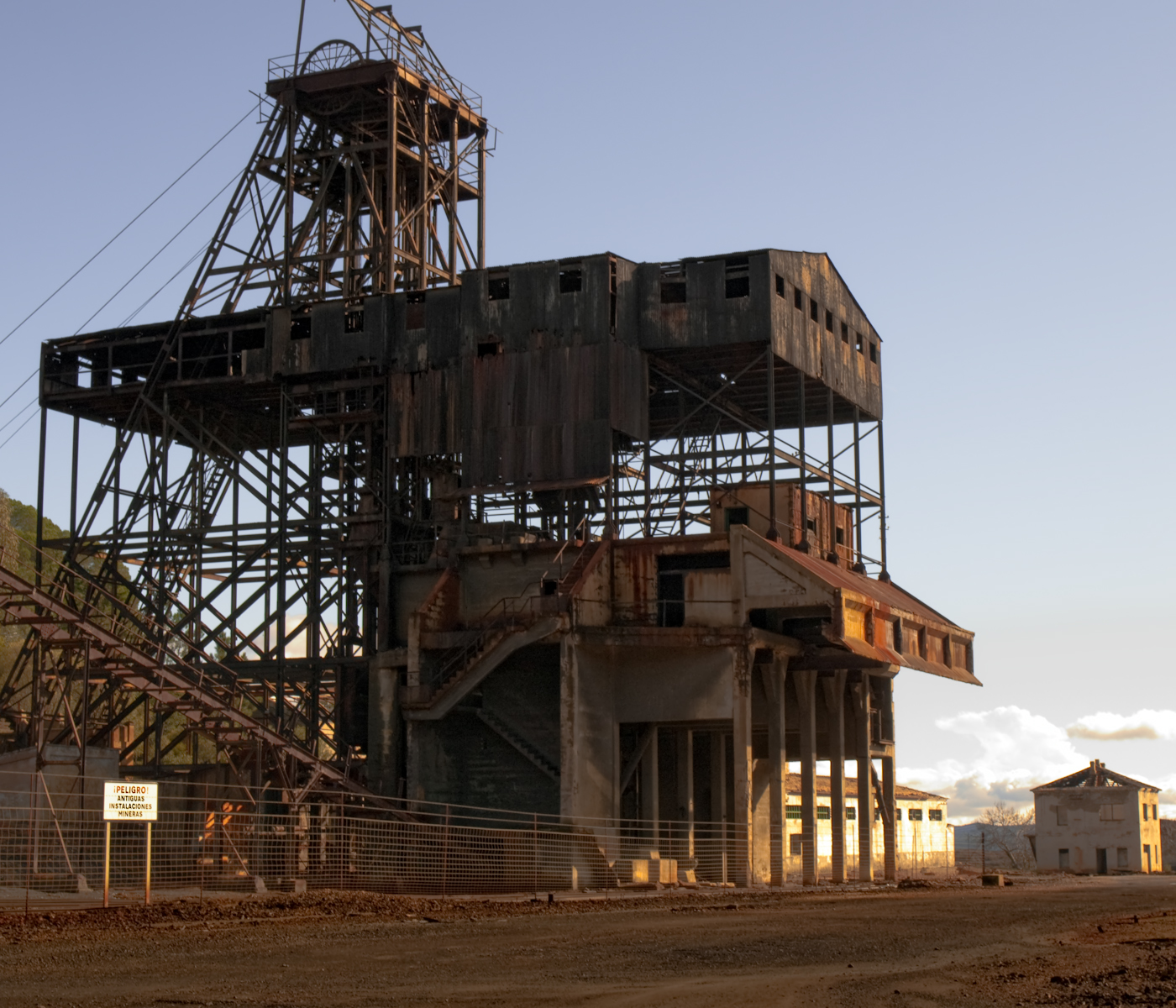
Algaida Well, at La Zarza mine.

The Tharsis-La Zarza mining basin, colloquially known as the Tharsis mines, is a Spanish mining area located in the province of Huelva. Its main centers are in the municipalities of Alosno, Calañas, Cerro de Andévalo and La Zarza-Perrunal. The basin is part of the Iberian Pyrite Belt.

Historically, this area has been exploited for mining purposes, and an important mining-industrial complex has been developed. There is material and archaeological evidence of mining activities throughout various periods of antiquity. However, the peak of exploitation was reached in the course of the 19th and 20th centuries under the management of the British Tharsis Sulphur and Copper Company Limited, which introduced modern methods of extraction and began the exploitation of surface mining deposits through the "cortas" system. During this period, important industrial facilities, railway lines, mining towns, etc. were also built. The Tharsis mines have been considered the second most important in the province of Huelva after Riotinto.

As a result of the activities that have been developed during the late modern period, there is an extensive historical and industrial heritage, especially that which is linked to the British exploitation period. Due to this, in the last decades several initiatives have been launched for its preservation and use for tourism purposes. In 2014, the Tharsis-La Zarza mining basin was declared an Asset of Cultural Interest with the category of heritage area.

== Characteristics ==
The Tharsis-La Zarza mining basin is located in the east of the province of Huelva, within the limits of the Andévalo region, extending to the estuaries of the Odiel and Tinto rivers. The Tharsis basin has been considered one of the most representative mining districts of the Iberian Pyrite Belt, of which it forms part, and constitutes one of the westernmost mining areas within the Sierra Morena mining area. Throughout its history the main activity has been dedicated to the extraction, transformation and transport of pyrite (iron, copper and sulfur). In contemporary times, the main mining centers of the basin were "Tharsis" and "La Zarza", both located within the municipalities of Alosno and Calañas, respectively. In the case of the former, this included the Filón Sur, Filón Norte, Filón Centro, Esperanza, Sierra Bullones and Lagunazo, while the latter included the deposits of La Zarza and Perrunal.

Within the mining district of Tharsis there are up to sixteen masses of massive sulfides, among which stand out Filón Norte, San Guillermo, Sierra Bullones and Poca Pringue in the northern part; Filón Centro, Filón Sur, Esperanza and Prado Vicioso in the central area; Vulcano, Almagrera and La Lapilla in the southern part of the district. The Lagunazo and Pozo San Jorge masses have been closely associated with the Tharsis district, although from a technical point of view they are not part of it. Crude pyrite is the main mining product, although historically sulfur, copper, gold and silver have also been obtained. The precious metals were extracted from the gossan quarries, while the sulfur came from primary mineralization.

== History ==
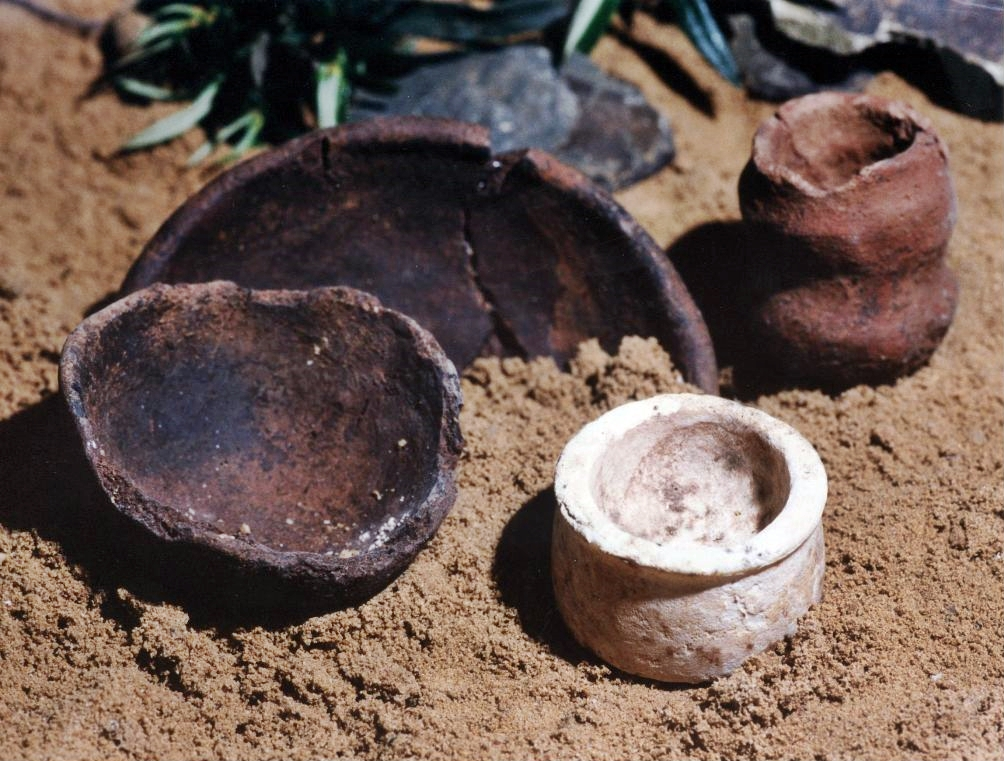
Archaeological pieces from the Cabezo Juré site.

=== From Prehistory to Late antiquity ===
Traditionally, the mining deposits of Tharsis and La Zarza have been considered to be among the oldest in the world. Archaeological evidence suggests that natural resources were already being exploited by man at least as far back as the Copper Age. In fact, the name "Tharsis" has come to be frequently associated with Tartessos, whose culture flourished at the end of that period. In the settlement of Cabezo Juré, located in the municipality of Alosno, excavations in contemporary times have recorded the existence of prehistoric copper smelters. The metallurgical production of this period reached its peak during the 6th and 5th centuries BC, under the influence of the Iberian Peninsula's trade with the eastern Mediterranean territories. (Note: Some authors consider that the Bible mentions the mines of Tharsis. —Sáez, Donaire & Moreno (2017, p. 87)— Biblical texts refer to "Tharsis" as a land of great wealth and its commercial relationship with the East. — de Lope (2003, p. 374))

Under Roman rule, the deposits in the Tharsis area were intensely exploited, especially during the High Roman Empire period. If previously the mining activities had been centered in the "orientalizing" core of Filón Sur, in the Augustus period they extended to the masses of Esperanza, Filón Norte, Filón Centro and Sierra Bullones. The workings reached a high technical level: it is known that the Romans carried out the subway extraction by means of contramina workings, using complex systems of hydraulic wells to move the water inside the galleries. Working conditions were severe for the miners, mostly slaves, due to factors such as dust, high humidity, poor lighting and high temperatures. Contemporary studies of the Roman slag heaps in the area have indicated that silver and copper were the metals of greatest production during this stage.

The Tharsis deposits were probably active at least until the general crisis of the Lower Empire (3rd-4th centuries), and their exploitation was definitively abandoned around the beginning of the Visigothic period. The mining work undertaken in this area during Antiquity was of such a magnitude that it left an important mass of slag heaps and considerably altered the physiognomy of the territory. During the 19th century, numerous engineers and geologists visited the deposits of the Iberian Pyrite Belt, carrying out studies of the old exploitations. As a result of these investigations, it was calculated that there were about twenty million tons of slag that would have been generated during the Ancient Age, 20% of which were located in the Tharsis area.

=== Centuries of inactivity ===
During the 16th century, exploration work was carried out in the area's deposits, but no initiative prospered. It is a fact that the vast majority of mining operations in the Iberian Pyrite Belt remained inactive since the end of the Roman period. It was during the 19th century when the deposits of the Alosno mountains were visited again by mining engineers such as Fausto Elhuyar, Joaquín Ezquerra, Agustín Martínez Alcíbar or Luciano Escobar. In 1850, the latter even outlined a plan for the exploitation of the deposits, a project that he presented to businessmen from Cadiz, Huelva and Seville. However, Escobar's initiative did not find financial support and would end up being abandoned. At the same time, foreign capital also began to show interest in the deposits of the western Andévalo, especially in view of the difficulties encountered in acquiring the Riotinto mines from the State.

=== Reactivation: The Golden Age ===
The activity of the mining basin would be reactivated by the French engineer Ernest Deligny, who showed interest in the area after a visit to the Alosno mountains and the Huelva estuary in February 1853. It was Deligny himself who took the initiative to name the main group of deposits as "mines of Tharsis", as he considered that they should recover the name they had held in antiquity. Various works of rehabilitation of the mines were undertaken by the Compañía investigadora de Tharsis, which would be succeeded in 1855 by the French Compagnie des Mines de Cuivre de Huelva. The Gallic company managed to exploit the deposits, having in the British industrialists the main client for the mining production of pyrites, sulfur, etc. By 1858, some 2500 workers were working in the Tharsis area, with a monthly production of 9000 tons of ore. However, various difficulties and economic problems put a stop to the activities. As a result, in 1866 the French leased the exploitation of the mines to the British Tharsis Sulphur and Copper Company Limited by means of an amicable agreement.

During the last third of the 19th century and the first half of the 20th century, the exploitation of the mining reserves increased considerably and modern methods were introduced. Shortly after starting its activities in Spain, the British company also undertook the construction of a railway line, as well as a pier-dock on the Odiel River to dispose of the extracted minerals. Workshops, ore silos, a power plant, warehouses and dwellings, etc. were also built. In Corrales, an ore crushing plant was set up to manage the production from the Tharsis and La Zarza mines. Within the basin, other deposits of some importance were in operation, such as the Lagunazo mine, which was operated by several companies until its closure in 1902. The Perrunal mine, of subterranean character, also stood out. Initially operated by the Tharsis company, in 1899 it was acquired by the Sociedad Francesa de Piritas de Huelva.

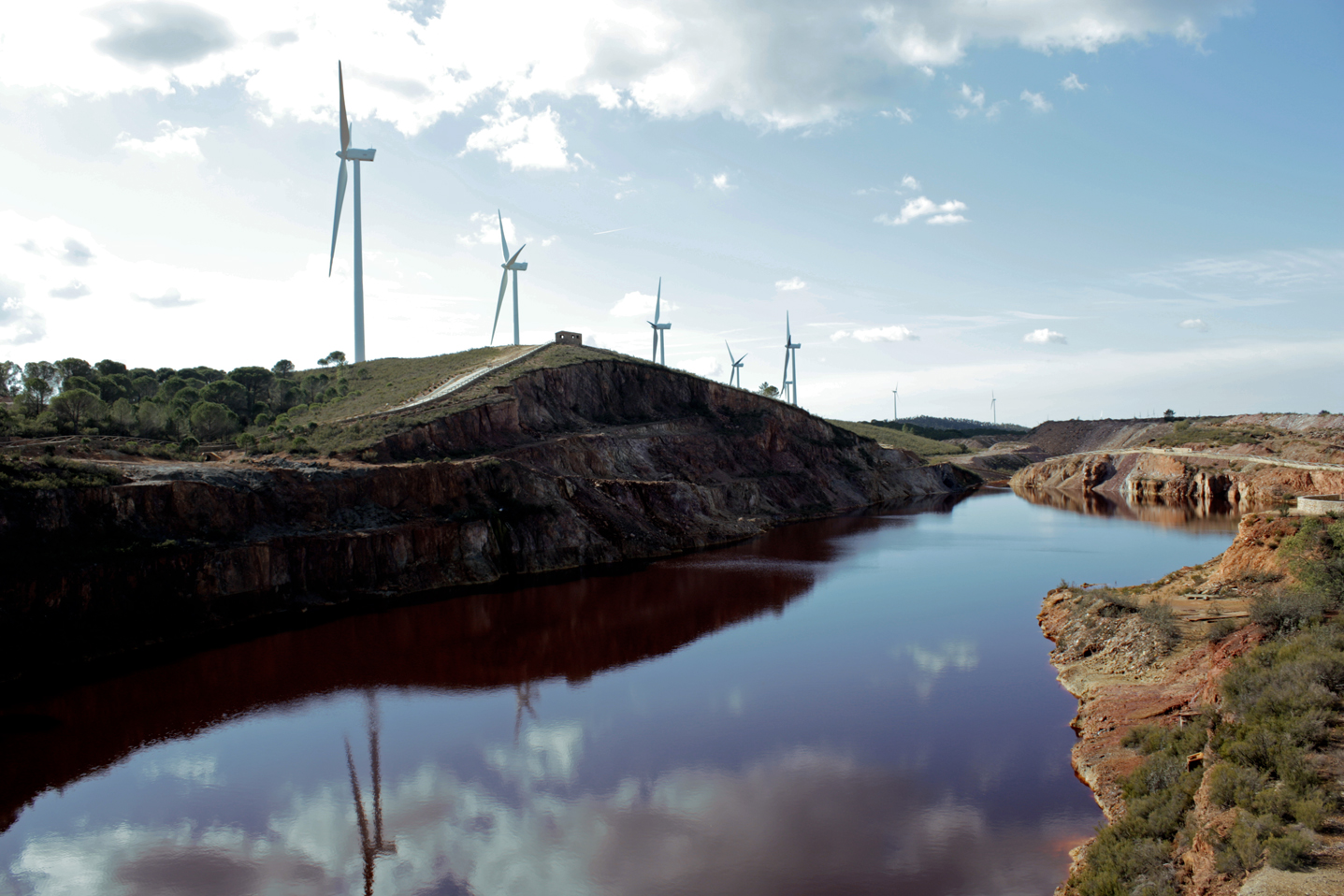
Tharsis Corta Filón Centro.

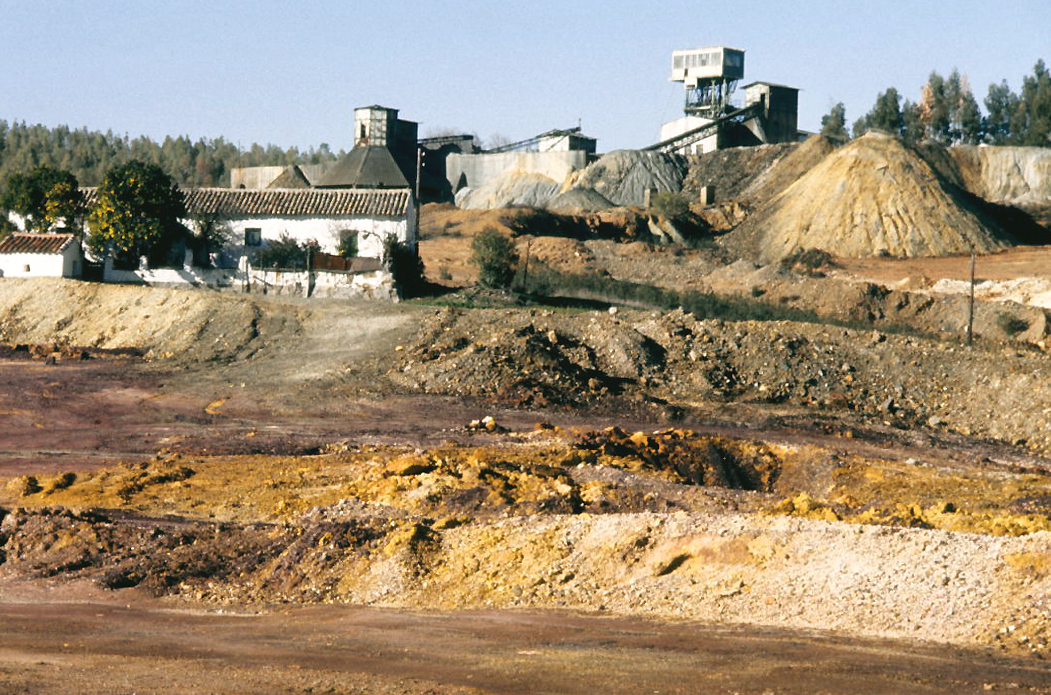
The Tharsis mines in 1986.

In the early days, the traditional system of subway galleries was maintained, although at the end of the 19th century surface mining, the so-called "cortas", began to be implemented. As the mining works progressed, a series of large-scale mines were set up in the basin, among which Filón Sur, Filón Norte, Filón Centro, Corta Sierra Bullones, Corta Esperanza and Corta de los Silos stand out. (Note: At the La Zarza mine, open-pit mining began in 1886, although subway mining continued at the same time. — López Pamo (2009, p. 13)) On the other hand, over the years the reserves of some deposits were depleted, which led to the cessation of activity. This was the case of the Perrunal mine, which was closed in 1969.

The expansion of mining activities meant the need for a greater number of workers, which would eventually lead to a profound change in the demography of the area. In Alosno the population increased from 3214 inhabitants in 1850 to 12,045 in 1887. Something similar happened in Calañas, which went from 1872 inhabitants in 1850 to 9644 in 1887. In this municipality, two workers' settlements were built next to the La Zarza and Perrunal deposits. Within the municipality of Alosno another settlement was built, called Tharsis, to house the workers of the mines. Likewise, there was a small colony of British managers and engineers, who settled in Pueblo Nuevo of Tharsis.

During the 1970s control of the mining basin passed into the hands of Spanish capital after a long and complex purchase process, and the Compañía Española de Minas de Tharsis was formed for this purpose. By then the main activity in the area was around the Tharsis Corta Filón Norte and the La Zarza complex. In the Filón Norte area mining was carried out in open pit and had an annual production of one million tons of ore. La Zarza, on the other hand, had subway counter-mining operations, with an annual production of about 400,000 tons of ore. Another remarkable fact of this period was that, from then on, a considerable part of the pyrite obtained was no longer destined for export and began to be sent to the plants of the new Chemical Park of Huelva. By the early 1980s the mineral reserves of the Tharsis and La Zarza deposits were estimated at 120 million tons. After the closure of Corta Atalaya de Riotinto in 1992, Tharsis remained the only mine in Huelva producing raw pyrite.

=== Current stage ===
From 1990 onwards, the Tharsis mines went through a deep decline due to the crisis that the sector was going through in those years. As early as 1991, activity ceased at La Zarza, whose facilities were abandoned. The Odiel pier-dock was closed to service in 1993, which put an end to the export of the mineral by sea. From then on, the pyritic production of Tharsis was destined almost exclusively to the facilities of the Chemical Park of Huelva, where everything from sulfuric acid to phosphates were produced. The Compañía Española de Minas de Tharsis ceased operations at the end of 1995 due to persistent poor economic results. A labor corporation, Nueva Tharsis, was then formed, through which the workers took over the direct management of the business.

At the end of the 20th century, the progressive fall in the price of copper in international markets made profitable mining unfeasible, which resulted in numerous losses. This crisis eventually contributed to the closure of most of the Tharsis deposits, a process that culminated in 2001. In the Corta Filón Sur, Caledonia Mining maintained gossan mining until 2002. As a result of this process, the railway line was closed and semi-dismantled, while the basin facilities were abandoned. On a social level, the end of what had been the main economic activity for more than a century was a blow to the population of the area. The new situation led public institutions to promote the rehabilitation of the old Tharsis mines for recreational purposes. This work ranged from the construction of trails around the open-cast mines to reforestation work in the old dumps. Another significant initiative was the establishment in 2007 of the Tharsis mining museum, whose collection includes railway material and an extensive collection of documents.

== Historical-industrial heritage ==
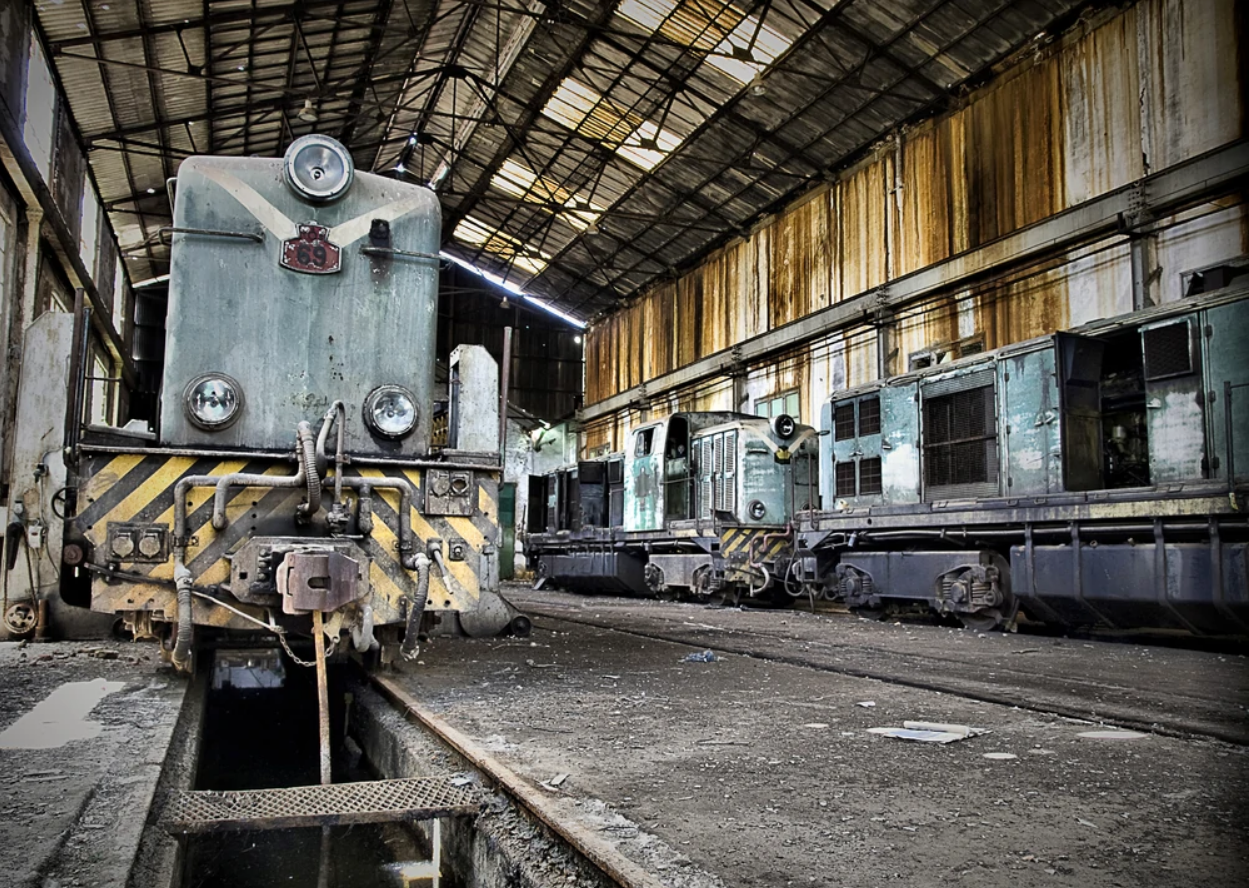
Tharsis workshops, 2009.

Since the reactivation of the basin in the 19th century, several industrial facilities have been built in connection with the extraction and processing of minerals: loading docks, winches, railway tracks, power plants, offices, reservoirs, etc. In the area of Filón Norte some singular constructions stand out, such as the complex of the depot, the ore loading silo, the thermal power station or a railway station with a spacious railway yard. Next to the Tharsis mines, a small exclusive settlement was built where the British technicians and directors of the Tharsis Sulphur and Copper Company Limited lived. Likewise, a series of workers' settlements were built in the towns of Tharsis, La Zarza and Perrunal to house the miners and their families. (Note: In the architecture of the Tharsis-La Zarza mining basin, typologies of Anglo-Saxon origin proliferated, similar to what happened in the minas de Riotinto mining basin. —Romero Macías, Aguilera & Pérez López (2010, pp. 24))

Likewise, in the Tharsis area, facilities such as calcination plazas, factories, workshops and ore warehouses were built. Eventually, channeling systems were also constructed to obtain copper by wet process. The increase in hydrometallurgical activities required a greater need for access to water, a commodity for which there were no large reserves in the area. At the end of the 19th century, TOS (Tharsis Sulphur and Copper Company Limited) built several reservoirs in the basin: Grande, Pino and Puerto León. Another large reservoir was also built at the Lagunazo mine, with a 14 meter high dam and a water reservoir.

Since the cessation of mining activities around the year 2000, the industrial heritage of the area has progressively fallen into a state of ruin and abandonment. Some installations have been dismantled and others have been affected by the plundering of their parts, as is the case of the railway. In the Perrunal mine, the dismantling of heritage has reached even greater heights. In June 2014 the regional administration registered the Tharsis-La Zarza mining basin in the General Catalog of Andalusian Historical Heritage under the figure of Cultural Heritage Monument (Bien de Interés Cultural or BIC in Spanish).

== Railway network ==
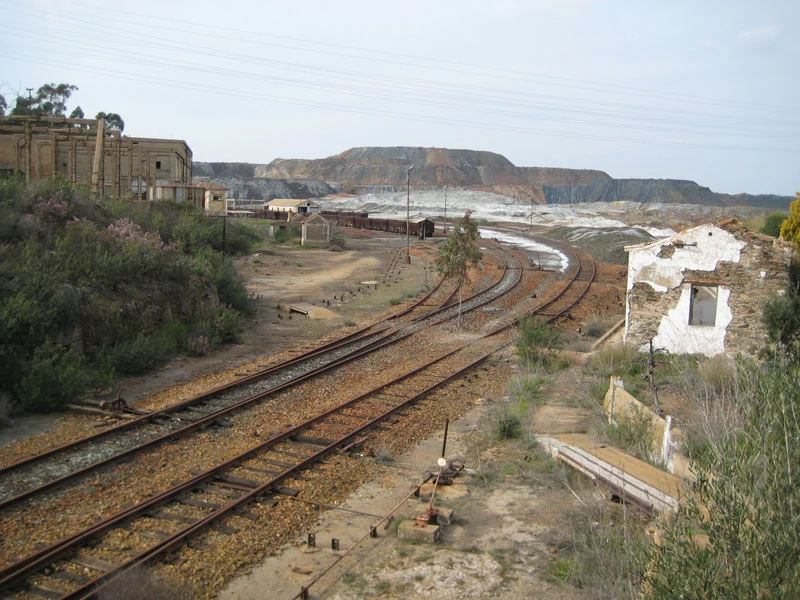
Railway tracks and facilities, Tharsis train station.

Between 1867 and 1870, the engineers of the Tharsis Sulphur and Copper Company Limited built the Tharsis railway, whose layout allowed the linking of the mining basin with the sea through a line. Years later, in 1888, a branch line was added linking the main line with the La Zarza mine. After that, a network of tracks, branches and derivations that linked the deposits and industrial facilities was formed. Over the years, an important railway complex was built in Tharsis, which had a locomotive depot, workshops and a wide track network for the classification of mining trains. Another mining railway, built in 1901, also came to operate in the basin, linking the Perrunal mine facilities with the Zafra-Huelva railway.

== See also ==
- Riotinto-Nerva mining basin
- Empalme-La Zarza line
- Peña del Hierro mine

== Bibliography ==
- Blázquez, José María (1978). Historia económica de la Hispania romana (in Spanish). Madrid: Ediciones Cristiandad.
- Carrasco, Iván (1999). La minería en Andalucía: situación actual y perspectivas (in Spanish). Sevilla: Fundación Machado. pp. 103–116.
- Carvajal, Domingo; González, Arsenio J. (2016). "La Ruta de las Piritas en Huelva, dentro del Proyecto Internacional RUMYS" (PDF). Fundación Río Tinto (in Spanish): 339–364.
- Costa, María Teresa (1983). La financiación exterior del capitalismo español en el siglo XIX (in Spanish). Universidad de Barcelona.
- de Lope, Manuel (2003). Iberia. La puerta iluminada (in Spanish). Barcelona: Random House Mondadori.
- Domínguez, Consuelo (2012). "Historia, patrimonio e identidad: la vida en el poblado minero de Tharsis". Diputación Provincial de Huelva (in Spanish). Huelva: 177–193.
- Flores Caballero, Manuel (2011). Las fuerzas de la revolución industrial en la fiebre minera del XIX (in Spanish). Editorial Fundación para la investigación Juan Manuel Flores Jimeno.
- Grande Gil, José Antonio (2016). Drenaje ácido de mina en la faja pirítica ibérica: técnicas de estudio e inventario de explotaciones (in Spanish). Universidad de Huelva.
- Gonzalo y Tarín, Joaquín (1886). "Descripción fisica, geológica y minera de la provincia de Huelva". Imprenta y Fundición de Manuel Tello (in Spanish). 1. Madrid.
- Gonzalo y Tarín, Joaquín (1888). "Descripción fisica, geológica y minera de la provincia de Huelva". Imprenta y Fundición de Manuel Tello (in Spanish). 2. Madrid.
- López Pamo, Enrique (2009). Cortas mineras inundadas de la Faja Pirítica: inventario e hidroquímica (in Spanish). Madrid: Instituto Geológico y Minero de España.
- Márquez Macías, Rosario; Tornero, Pablo (1986). "Minería, población y sociedad en la provincia de Huelva (1840-1900)" (PDF). Instituto de Estudios Onubenses (in Spanish) (1). Huelva: 379–413. ISSN 1136-6877.
- Mosquera, Clara; Navarro de Pablos, Javier; Navas, Daniel; Mosquera, Eduardo (2021). "La Zona Patrimonial de la Cuenca Minera de Riotinto-Nerva. Trayectoria y retos patrimoniales de futuro" (PDF). Universidad Politécnica de Valencia (in Spanish). I simposio anual de patrimonio natural y cultural. ICOMOS España: 493–503.
- Oyarzún Muñoz, Jorge (2019). Principios de geología y exploración minera (in Spanish). Editorial Universidad de La Serena.
- Paz Sánchez, José Juan (2018). Entre el puerto y la mina (III). Ocaso del movimiento obrero organizado en Huelva y Riotinto (1916-1923) (in Spanish). Servicio de Publicaciones de la Universidad de Huelva.
- Pérez, Juan Manuel (2017). "Situación de los archivos mineros en España. El archivo histórico minero de Fundación Río Tinto". Universidad de Huelva (in Spanish). Patrimonio geológico y minero: Una apuesta por el desarrollo local sostenible: 579–592.
- Pérez Macías, Juan Aurelio; Delgado, Aquilino (2012). "Paisaje y territorio de Riotinto en época romana". Universidad Nacional de Educación a Distancia (in Spanish). Madrid: Paisajes mineros antiguos en la Península Ibérica. Investigaciones recientes y nuevas líneas de trabajo: 47–68.
- Romero, Emilio; Manzano, José Ramón; Membrillo, Francisco (2006). "Ferrocarriles mineros en la línea Zafra-Huelva". Universidad de Huelva (in Spanish). Los ferrocarriles en la provincia de Huelva: Un recorrido por el pasado: 321–334.
- Romero Macías, Emilio M.; Aguilera, Rafael; Pérez López, Juan Manuel. "El Patrimonio minero industrial de Tharsis y su repercusión en la comarca del Andévalo Onubense" (PDF). Sociedad Española para la Defensa del Patrimonio Geológico y Minero (in Spanish) (14). Madrid: De Re Metallica: 23–33. ISSN 1888-8615.
- Sáez, Reinaldo; Donaire, Teodosio; Moreno, Carmen (2017). "Geología de la Faja pirítica ibérica: una ventana al infierno paleozoico". Universidad de Huelva (in Spanish). Geología de la provincia de Huelva: 87–110.
- Sáiz González, J. Patricio (1999). Invención, patentes e innovación en la España Contemporánea (in Spanish). Madrid: Oficina Española de Patentes y Marcas.
- Sánchez, Francisco (2006). "El ferrocarril Tharsis-Río Odiel". Universidad de Huelva (in Spanish). Los ferrocarriles en la provincia de Huelva: Un recorrido por el pasado: 207–227.
- Sánchez Gullón, Enrique; García de Lomas, Juan (2012). "El jardín inglés de Miss Gray en Tharsis (Huelva)" (PDF). Floramontiberica (in Spanish) (10). Bouteloua: 15–24. ISSN 1988-4257.
- Santiago, Antonio (2016). "Posibilidades turísticas de poblados y explotaciones mineras". Universidad de Huelva (in Spanish): 281–298.
- Tejada Hernández, Francisco José (2017). El derecho minero romano ante la ilustración hispanoamericana (in Spanish). Madrid: Editorial Dykinson.
- Vázquez Guzmán, Fernando (1983). Depósitos minerales de España (in Spanish). Madrid: Instituto Geológico y Minero de España.
- Gómez, Daniel (2014). "Tharsis: mucho más que legado histórico". Diario de Sevilla (in Spanish).
