= Buitrón railway =

Spanish railway in Huelva province

Buitrón Railway
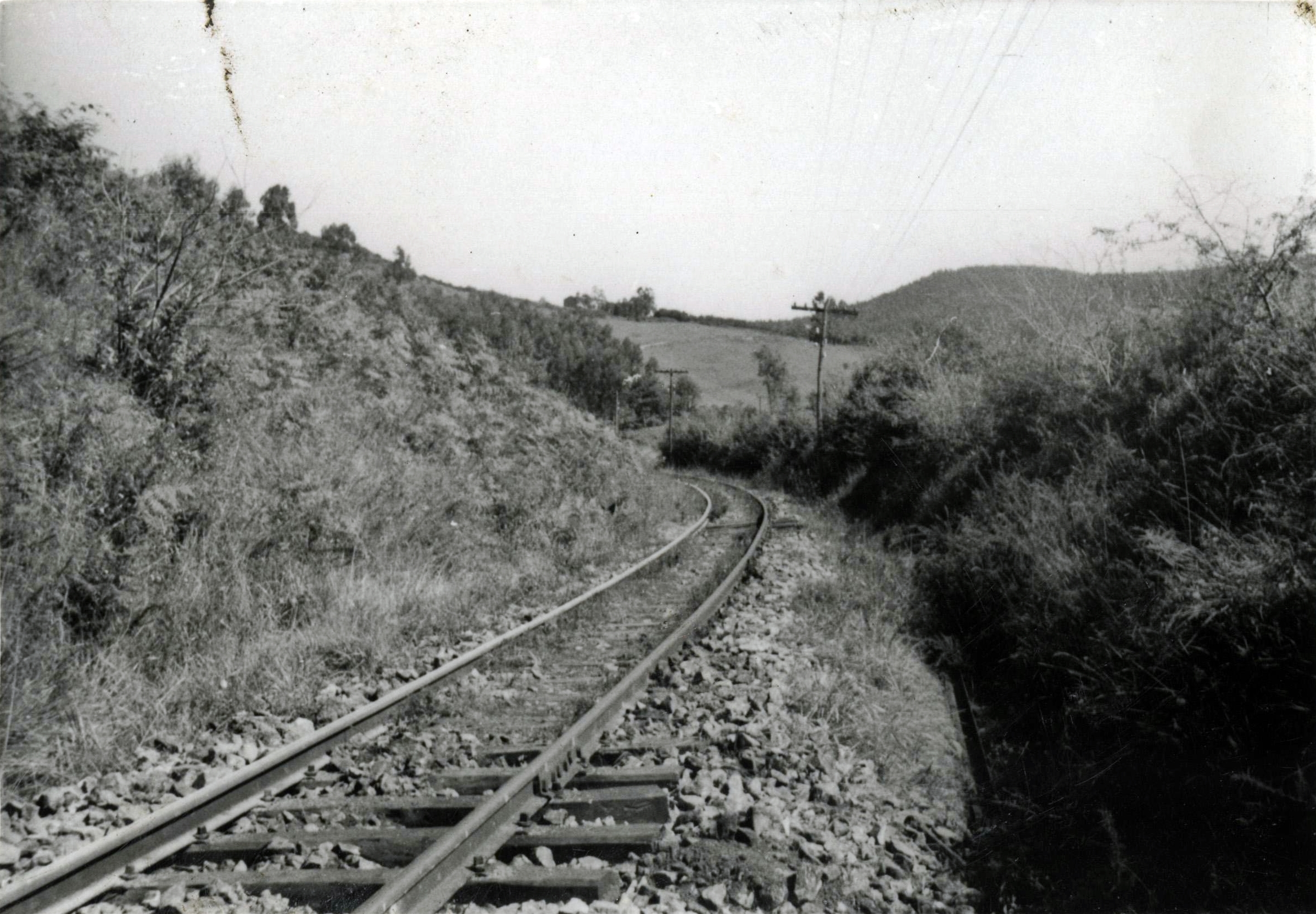
- View of the route, c. 1940 or 1942.

Overview
- Status: Dismantled
- Termini: San Juan del Puerto; Zalamea la Real

Service
- Type: Railway
- System: Narrow-gauge railway

History
- Opened: 1 September 1870
- Closed: 30 April 1969

Technical
- Line length: 90 km (56 mi)
- Track gauge: 1,067 mm (3 ft 6 in)

The Buitrón Railway (Spanish: Ferrocarril de Buitrón) was a Spanish narrow-gauge railway of a mining character, which was in service between 1870 and 1969. Throughout its history, the route was mainly used for transporting minerals extracted from the various deposits in the area.

Considered the first railway built in the province of Huelva, it was inaugurated in 1870 and remained operational for almost a century. During its existence, the railway line served several mining deposits in the area, although it also had passenger services. The operation of the railway passed into state hands after the end of the Spanish Civil War, although operational deficits eventually led to its closure in 1969.

Today, part of the former route has been rehabilitated and forms part of several greenways. Some original infrastructures of the line, such as stations and bridges, have been preserved.

== History ==
=== Origins and construction ===
The line was established with the aim of transporting minerals extracted from the Castillo de Buitrón mines, located in the municipality of Zalamea la Real, to San Juan del Puerto. Although a concession for this purpose was granted by the state in 1859, the initiative did not end well. In 1862, the South Europe Mining Co. Ltd. acquired the mines (Note: Ownership of the mines and the railway later passed to the Buitron and Huelva Railway and Mineral Co. Ltd. However, this company went bankrupt in 1891, after which the mines and railway facilities remained for some time in the hands of its creditors, until 1904–1906.) and a few years later, presented a new railway project; this was approved by the authorities, after which construction work began. The track gauge to be used on this railway was 1067 mm. After several years of work, the line began operations on 1 September 1870.

=== Heyday ===
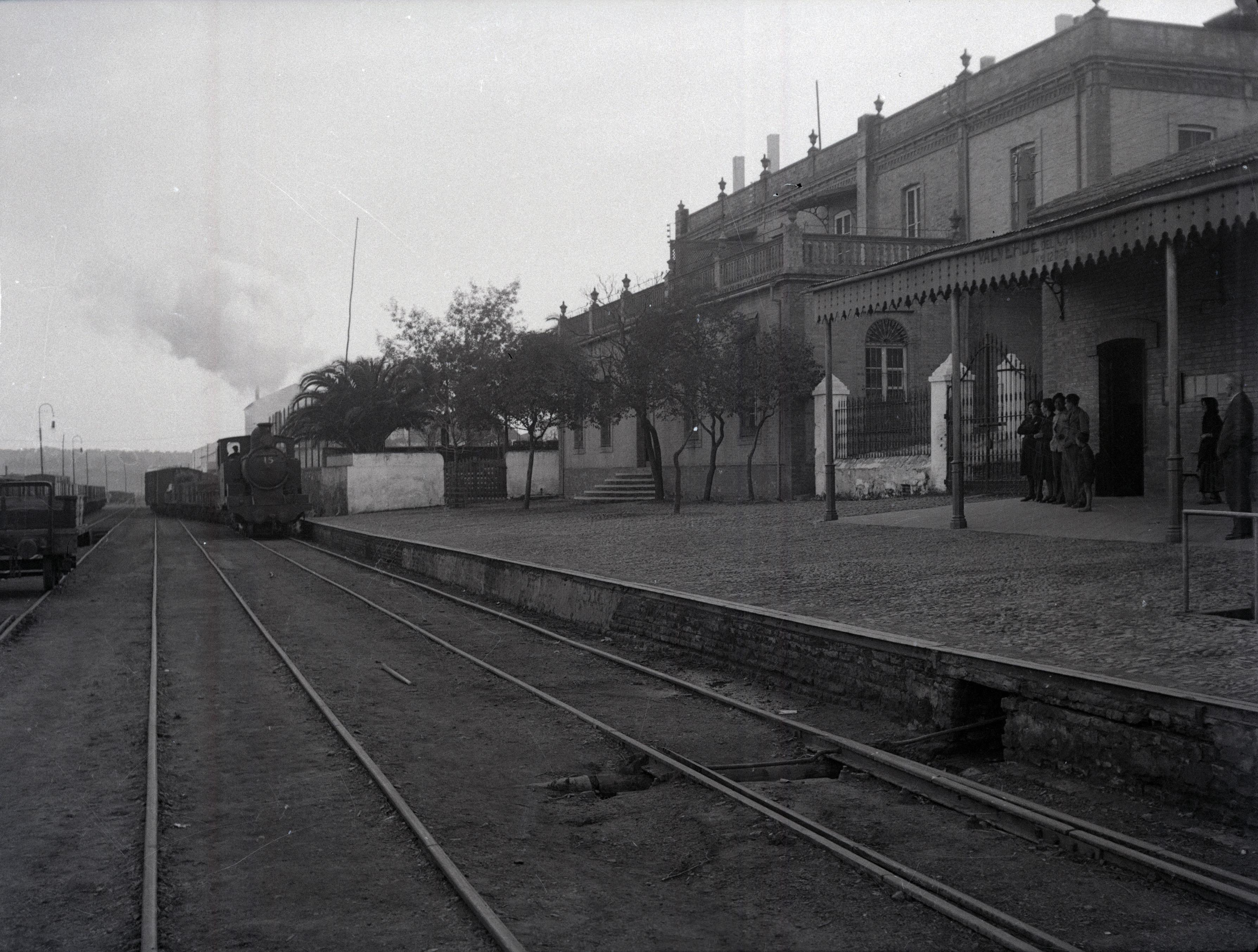
View of Valverde del Camino station and offices, c. 1940–1942.

The original route inaugurated in 1870 initially covered only about 35 kilometres between San Juan del Puerto and Valverde del Camino. This section was later extended northwards, linking with the El Buitrón and Zalamea area via El Empalme station. Thus, over time, new extensions were added to the original route: Empalme–Zalamea or Zalamea–Mina Concepción. Many branches were also built connecting the main line with the various deposits or mining operations. This was the case of the branch that connected the Sotiel Coronada mine with the Buitrón main line through El Cuervo station, built in 1886.

This set of main lines and branches resulted in a network several dozen kilometres long, which had connections with other railways. In the San Juan del Puerto area, various facilities and connecting tracks were built to facilitate both freight and passenger transfers with the Seville–Huelva line, of Iberian gauge. In addition, a branch line ran from San Juan del Puerto station to the Tinto River wharf. In Zalamea la Real, at the beginning of the 20th century, a junction track was established with a branch of the Riotinto Railway. In Valverde del Camino were located the company's headquarters, as well as the locomotive depot and the line's main workshops.

In addition to mining services, the operating company maintained a passenger service between 1875 and 1935.

Between 1904 and 1906, the powerful United Alkali Company acquired the mines and the railway, creating in turn a subsidiary company in Spain —the "Compañía Anónima de Buitrón" (1907)— for the management of the railway line and its branches. Until well into the 1920s, the company went through a prosperous period that translated into great activity for the mining railway. However, the poor economic situation that followed that period —especially after the 1929 Crash— and the situation created by the Spanish Civil War led the owning company to face a difficult horizon, renouncing the railway concession in 1941.

=== State operation ===
The state railway operating agency, Explotación de Ferrocarriles por el Estado, took over the line on 1 January 1942, after the renunciation of its previous owners. The state, which became the owner of the railway, restored passenger services in 1942. Freight services for mineral trains also continued. However, railway operation continued to show negative balances, while mining in the area went into decline, which in the long run would favour its closure. Already by 1957 some sections and branches were closed to rail traffic, although the route between San Juan del Puerto and Zalamea la Real remained open, by then largely reduced to passenger transport. In 1965, administration of the route passed to the newly created FEVE (Spanish Narrow-Gauge Railways). During this period, the rolling stock for passenger services was renewed, with the introduction of diesel railcars, but competition from road transport made the line's operation unsustainable. The still operational route remained in service until its closure on 30 April 1969.

== Current situation ==
After the line's closure, the tracks were lifted and many of the railway facilities were dismantled or abandoned. In other cases, such as in Valverde del Camino, part of the former railway complex has been rehabilitated for other uses. Furthermore, in recent years, part of the former route between San Juan del Puerto and Valverde del Camino has been partially rehabilitated for conversion into the so-called Molinos del Agua Greenway (Vía verde de Molinos del Agua), which is 33.20 kilometres long. In turn, another part of the route has been recovered within the Riotinto Greenway (Vía verde de Riotinto), which runs between Valverde del Camino and Minas de Riotinto. The narrow-gauge branch that connected Zalamea la Real with Mina Concepción has been recovered as the Odiel Greenway (Vía verde del Odiel).

== Route and characteristics ==
The railway came to have an operational network of tracks reaching 90 kilometres in length, with a gauge of 1067 millimetres. The main route was 48.8 kilometres long and originally had five stations: San Juan del Puerto, Trigueros, Venta Eligio, Valverde del Camino and Mina Buitrón. Later, several branches were added to connect with the mines in the area. The branch between Zalamea la Real and Mina Poderosa originally had a gauge of 0.762 metres, although between 1904 and 1906 it was adapted to the 1067 millimetre gauge.

In Valverde del Camino, a railway complex was established consisting of the station, the locomotive depot, the line's main workshops, the railway's headquarters, and housing. In the San Juan del Puerto area, a wharf for loading minerals was built.

In order to overcome the geographical features of the area, several engineering structures were built. Notable are the Chapa Bridge (Puente de Chapa), 112 metres long and belonging to the Mina Concepción branch, or the metal bridge over the Odiel River, 125 metres long and belonging to the Sotiel–El Cuervo branch. The most significant structure on the Empalme–Zalamea la Real branch is the Los Membrillos Tunnel, 129 metres long, whose portals were lined with a double ring of bricks.

== See also ==
- Tharsis Railway
- Zafra–Huelva railway line
