= Tharsis railway line =

Former railway of Spain

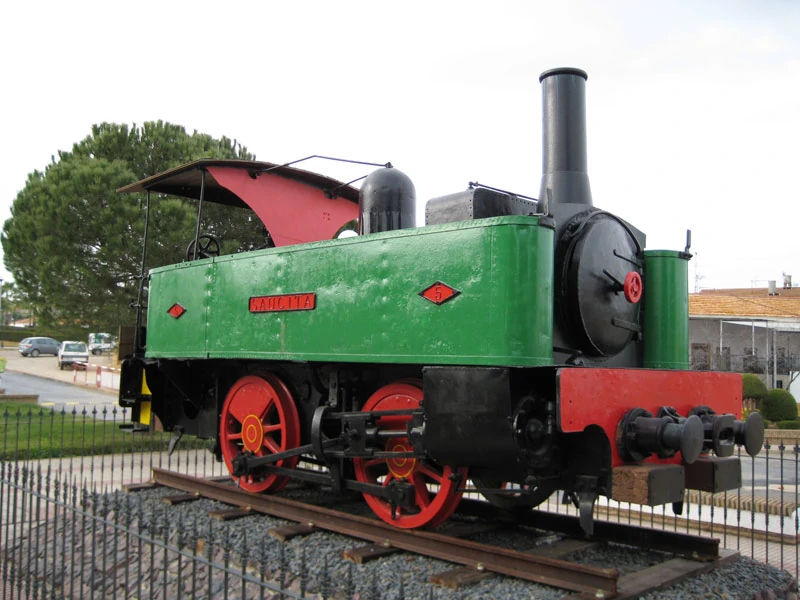
- Saucita locomotive n.º 5, in 2008.

Overview
- Native name: Ferrocarril de Tharsis
- Transit type: Railway

Operation
- Began operation: 6 February 1871
- Ended operation: 1 January 2000

Technical
- System length: 47 km
- Track gauge: 1220 mm

The Tharsis railway line, also known as the Tharsis-Río Odiel railway, was a Spanish narrow-gauge railway of mining industrial nature that operated between 1871 and 2000. It served as one of the most important railroads in the province of Huelva.

The railway line was built in the second half of the 19th century to provide an outlet to the sea for the minerals extracted by the British Tharsis Sulphur and Copper Company from its deposits in the Tharsis-La Zarza mining basin. It opened in 1871 and was among the province of Huelva's first railways. Its tracks had a gauge of 1220 millimeters, which was unique in Spain. The transportation service was operational for over a century until its discontinuation in January 2000. It primarily transported minerals and goods, with some passenger service available for several decades.

Most of the railway has now been dismantled, although a small part of the Tharsis-San Bartolomé section is abandoned and no longer in use. In 2014, some of its infrastructure was added to the Andalusian Historical Heritage Catalog as a good of cultural interest. A portion of the mobile railway heritage has been conserved and presented in various locations throughout the province.

== History ==
=== Origins and construction ===
The Tharsis-La Zarza region has a rich history as a mining basin, yet it wasn't until the 19th century that it became more extensively developed. In the 1850s, French engineer Ernest Deligny requested mining concessions from the State as part of a project that included the construction of a railway line to provide a maritime outlet for the mined minerals.

However, due to financing difficulties, the initiative was ultimately abandoned. The British Tharsis Sulphur and Copper Company Limited, which owned several mines in the Tharsis region of Huelva and had taken over the railway concession from French investors, was eventually commissioned to build the line. The engineers at "Tharsis" company modified the original proposal by introducing several technical changes. In 1867, the Spanish government approved a plan for the construction of the line, and work began shortly thereafter. The line was completed on 9 May 1870, but it wasn't until February 1871 that it opened to traffic. The total cost of the project was 193,382 pesetas at the time.

=== Peak period ===
The 47 km long railway line was the second to be built in Huelva province, following the inauguration of the Buitrón to San Juan del Puerto railway in 1870. The route ran from the Tharsis mines to the port of Corrales, situated on the Odiel River, near Huelva city. The track's gauge of 1220 mm made it unique within the Spanish railway system, since it was a very uncommon gauge. An iron wharf-dock of 809 meters in length was built on the Odiel River, with a single track. Afterwards, additional branches were added to the mainline: in 1881, a 15-kilometer section to the Lagunazo mine, and in 1888, another 30-kilometer branch extending from the Empalme station to the La Zarza mine. Railway complexes featuring multiple tracks and auxiliary installations were built in Tharsis, Corrales, and La Zarza.

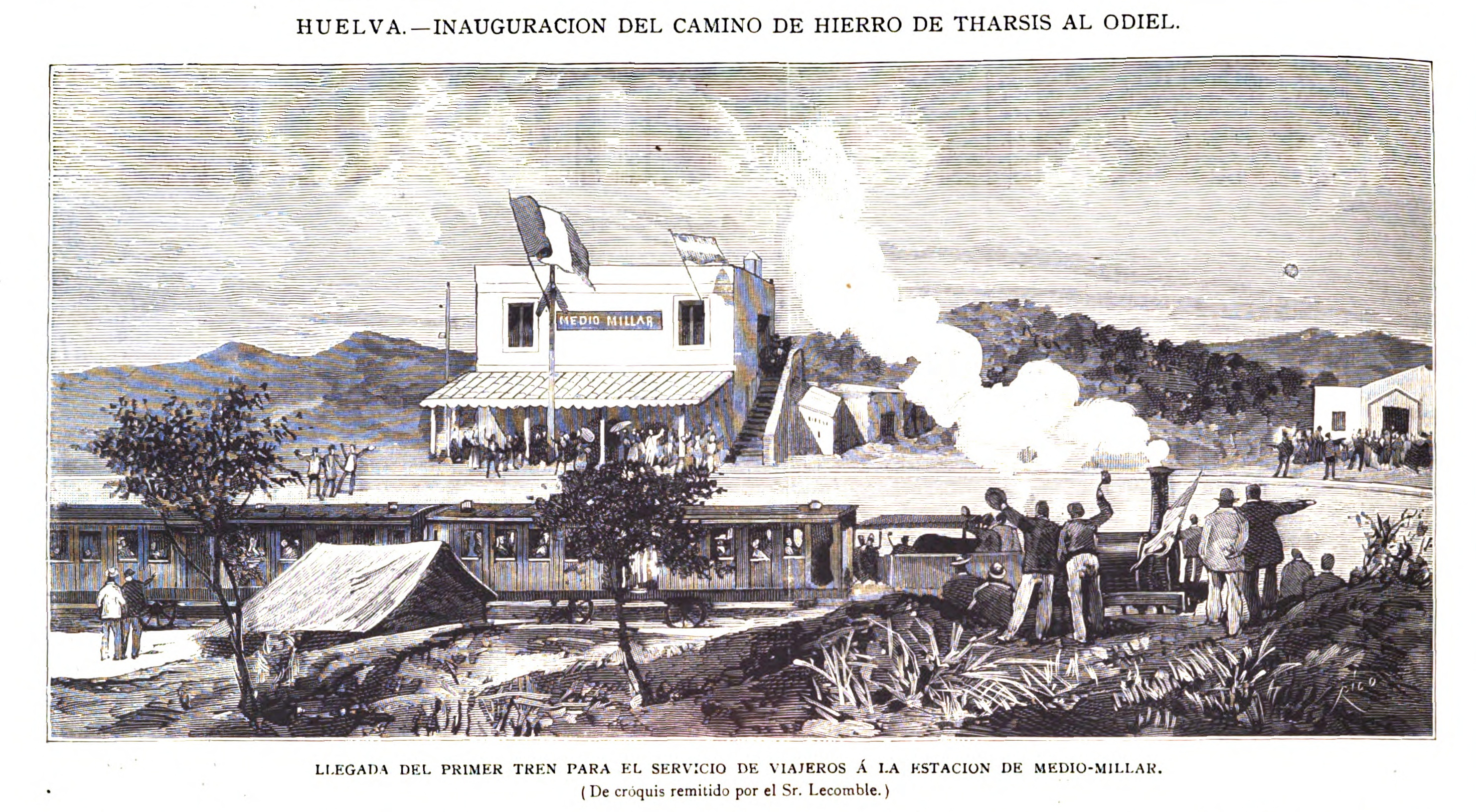
Arrival of first passenger train at Medio Millar station, 1881.

Throughout its existence, the Tharsis railway line had a significant fleet of engines and rolling stock, consisting of over 100 steam locomotives and nearly 1,000 ore wagons. While the primary purpose of the line was always mineral transportation, passenger services began in the late 19th century at the request of local residents. On 19 July 1881 a special train inaugurated the first service between the Corrales dock and the Medio Millar station. Due to a limited passenger service offering, only two trains, one ascending and one descending, covered the route once a week. The company purchased mixed 1st and 2nd class cars, as well as 3rd class cars. In 1884, passenger stations were established at Tharsis, Alosno, and Puntal de la Cruz.

The branch line to La Zarza's inauguration considerably increased mineral traffic. In the 1890s, thirteen trains were authorized to travel in each direction. The outward journey took 2 hours and 23 minutes, while the return journey took 2 hours and 19 minutes. The railway traffic reached its peak in the middle of the 20th century, when almost one million tons of ore were transported annually.

=== Modernization to decline ===
Passenger traffic on the mining railroad continued until 1967 when it was discontinued. Steam traction usage decreased and was fully terminated by 1969. In the 1970s, the railway line passed into the hands of the Compañía Española de Minas de Tharsis, which subsequently continued operating it.

In 1981, RENFE, the state-owned railway company, created a connection between its Gibraleón-Ayamonte line (Iberian gauge) and the Tharsis railway line. The link ran from the La Mezquita station to the Corrales station. To enable Iberian gauge trains (1668 millimeters) to access the Corrales railway complex, RENFE installed a third rail on the original 1220 mm track. Although the Gibraleón-Ayamonte line ceased operation in 1987, the Gibraleón-Mezquita-Corrales route continued to serve ore convoys for a brief period of time.

In May 1991, the Empalme-La Zarza railway branch ceased operations due to the mining crisis and ultimately closed in 1992. Four years later, the railway was dismantled to make way for a new road in the area. Meanwhile, the route from Corrales station to the Odiel wharf-dock remained operational until 1993 when it too was closed down as the Odiel River lacked sufficient draught. The remaining portion of the line continued to operate with Nueva Tharsis SAL taking over administration in 1995.

At that time, the volume of traffic on the railway line had sharply declined compared to previous levels. The fate of the railway was sealed when in 1999, the company FESA-Fertiberia announced that it would not be renewing its purchasing contract for ore from Tharsis. The last train ran on 22 December 1999 and the line was officially closed on 1 January 2000.

=== Recent times ===
After the railway closed, many facilities were abandoned and are now out of service. However, a significant portion of the historic route remains intact, including Tharsis, Empalme, Corrales, and other stations. In 2008, the mayor of Tharsis acquired the railway facilities, marking an initial step in their restoration. (Note: The purchase was made in June 2008 by the liquidation commission of the former Compañía Española de Minas de Tharsis, at a cost of around 300,000 euros. The local government of the area thus obtained the management concession of the old railway until 2069, with the option of using it for other purposes.) Despite various proposals to repurpose the railway for tourist-recreational use, similar to the Riotinto Tourist Mining Train, nothing has been done to date.

== Layout and characteristics ==
The main line spanned about 47 kilometers over mostly flat terrain, with the necessary construction of several metal lattice bridges to cross the ravines of Meca, Medio Millar, Multa, San Bartolomé, and Álamo. The 30-kilometer-long branch line between Empalme and La Zarza was more complex due to difficult terrain. This resulted in the construction of several bridges and viaducts using a gauge of 1220 millimeters, originating from Scotland and differing from the gauges used in most British and European layouts. This makes the Tharsis railway network an exceptional case within the Spanish railway context.

The main stations on the route were Corrales and Tharsis, with the latter housing the offices, workshops, and locomotive depot. Initially, only a set of intermediate stations were constructed, such as Medio Millar, San Bartolomé, and Fuente Salada, primarily intended as sidetracks. In 1884, the Medio Millar station was eliminated and upgraded with a new station in Alosno, located closer to the town bearing the same name.

Several years later, the Empalme station was constructed as a railway complex where the main line and the La Zarza line diverged, making it of significant importance. Notably, it was the singular facility on the entire railway to have a railway roundhouse. Intermediate stations were also outfitted with passenger buildings to offer services along the railway for many decades.

== Vehicle fleet and engine ==
Throughout its history, the Tharsis railway line had a fleet of several dozen steam locomotives responsible for pulling the freight convoys. In later years, the company acquired tractors and diesel locomotives. However, the wagon fleet was much larger. About 1,000 wagons were utilized for transporting minerals and freight, while two first-class wagons, five third-class wagons, five mixed wagons, and seven freight wagons were allocated for passenger services. Only a portion of this entire fleet has survived to the present day, with a few examples preserved in the Tharsis Mining Museum. A few locomotives are on display in the towns of Tharsis and Corrales.

== See also ==
- Compañía Española de Minas de Tharsis
- History of rail transport in Spain
- Riotinto Railway
- Tharsis-La Zarza mining basin
- Empalme-La Zarza line
- Madrid, Zaragoza and Alicante railway

== Bibliography ==
- Carvajal, Domingo; González, Arsenio J. (2016). Pérez Macías, Juan Aurelio (ed.). La Ruta de las Piritas en Huelva, dentro del Proyecto Internacional RUMYS (in Spanish). Universidad de Huelva. pp. 339–364.
- Dávila Martín, José Miguel; Madrona Mojarro, Antonio (2016). "Las estaciones de ferrocarril de la línea de Tharsis: sistemas constructivos y estructurales". I Congreso Internacional de Patrimonio Industrial y de la Obra Pública: Nuevas estrategias en la gestión del Patrimonio Industrial (in Spanish). pp. 303–313. ISBN 9788461756599.
- Flores Caballero, Manuel (2011). Las fuerzas de la revolución industrial en la fiebre minera del XIX (in Spanish). Fundación para la investigación Juan Manuel Flores Jimen.
- León Vela, José; Martínez Roldán, Nieves (2001). La reconversión de áreas industriales obsoletas (in Spanish). Vol. 1. Universidad de Sevilla.
- Llaudaró, Ferrán (1966). Los ferrocarriles mineros de la provincia de Huelva (PDF) (in Spanish). Fundación de los Ferrocarriles Españoles. pp. 21–22. ISSN 1134-1416.
- Luis Rodríguez, Ángel (2006). El ferrocarril minero de Tharsis al Odiel (in Spanish). Fundación de los Ferrocarriles Españoles. pp. 70–71. ISSN 1134-1416.
- Mojarro Bayo, Ana María (2010). La historia del puerto de Huelva (1873-1930) (in Spanish). Servicio de publicaciones de la Universidad de Huelva/Puerto de Huelva.
- Pérez López, Juan Manuel; Romero, Emilio; Carrasco, Iván (2006). Patrimonio ferroviario: nuevos usos y puesta en valor (in Spanish). Universidad de Huelva. pp. 527–548.
- Rábano, Isabel; Manteca, Ignacio; García, Cristóbal (2003). Patrimonio geológico y minero y desarrollo regional (in Spanish). Madrid: Instituto Geológico y Minero de España.
- Sánchez, Francisco (2006). El ferrocarril Tharsis-Río Odiel (in Spanish). Universidad de Huelva. pp. 207–227.
- Introducción (in Spanish). Universidad de Huelva. 2006. pp. 17–28.
