= Nueva Tharsis =

Spanish mining company

- Formation: 1996
- Type: S.A.
- Purpose: Mining industry

Nueva Tharsis is a Spanish mining company based in the town of Tharsis, Huelva, Spain. It is the heir of several of the companies that have been exploiting the deposits of the Tharsis-La Zarza mining basin since the second half of the 19th century.

== History ==
Nueva Tharsis was created in 1996 as a labor corporation by the workers of Compañía Española de Minas de Tharsis to take over its assets and facilities. Initially, the company aimed to maintain the business of the previous company, although the economic context was not favorable due to the low pyrite prices in the market. In 1999 the FESA-Fertiberia plant announced that it would not renew the mineral purchase contract with Tharsis, (Note: This was because the Fertiberia plant at the Chemical Park of Huelva had changed its production method and no longer needed the crude pyrite from Tharsis (Sánchez, 2006, pp. 224-225).) which sentenced the activity of the deposits. As a result, the Tharsis railroad and the main facilities in the area were closed to traffic. In view of the poor state of Nueva Tharsis' finances, in 2002 the company proposed the auction of the mining and railway assets, although this eventuality did not materialize in the end. In fact, the company would end up collaborating with public institutions in the conservation and recovery of the railway heritage. (Note: Several locomotives and passenger cars have been restored, being some of them relocated in the Mining Museum of Tharsis (Carvajal, González, 2016, pp. 353-354).)

Nueva Tharsis has subsequently reconstituted itself as a public limited company and has taken part in various mining initiatives. In 2018 it was acquired by the Andalusian company Magtel, as part of its foray into the mining sector. Nueva Tharsis, owner of the exploitation rights of the Tharsis and La Zarza deposits, became a shareholder in the company "Tharsis Mining & Metallurgy". There are currently several projects aimed at reopening the mining operations in the area.

== Bibliography ==
- Carvajal, Domingo; González, Arsenio J. (2016). "La Ruta de las Piritas en Huelva, dentro del Proyecto Internacional RUMYS". Río Tinto. Historia, patrimonio minero y turismo cultural (in Spanish). Juan Aurelio Pérez Macías et al. (eds.). Universidad de Huelva/ Fundación Río Tinto: 339–364. ISBN 978-84-16621-96-5.
- Giménez, Mar (1999). "La Cuenca Minera del carbón del valle del Alto Guadiato". Demófilo. Revista de cultura tradicional (32). Seville: Fundación Machado: 181–198.
- Sáez, Reinaldo; Donaire, Teodosio; Moreno, Carmen (2017). "Geología de la Faja pirítica ibérica: una ventana al infierno paleozoico". Geología de la provincia de Huelva (in Spanish). Reinaldo Sáez, Carmen Moreno, Gabriel R. Almodóvar (eds.). Universidad de Huelva: 87–110.
- Sánchez, Francisco (2006). "El ferrocarril Tharsis-Río Odiel". Los Ferrocarriles en la Provincia de Huelva: Un Recorrido Por el Pasado. Emilio Romero Macías (dir.) (es ed.). Universidad de Huelva: 207–227.
