= Chemical Park of Huelva =

Industrial complex in Huelva, Spain

37°13′51.04″N 6°56′55.56″W

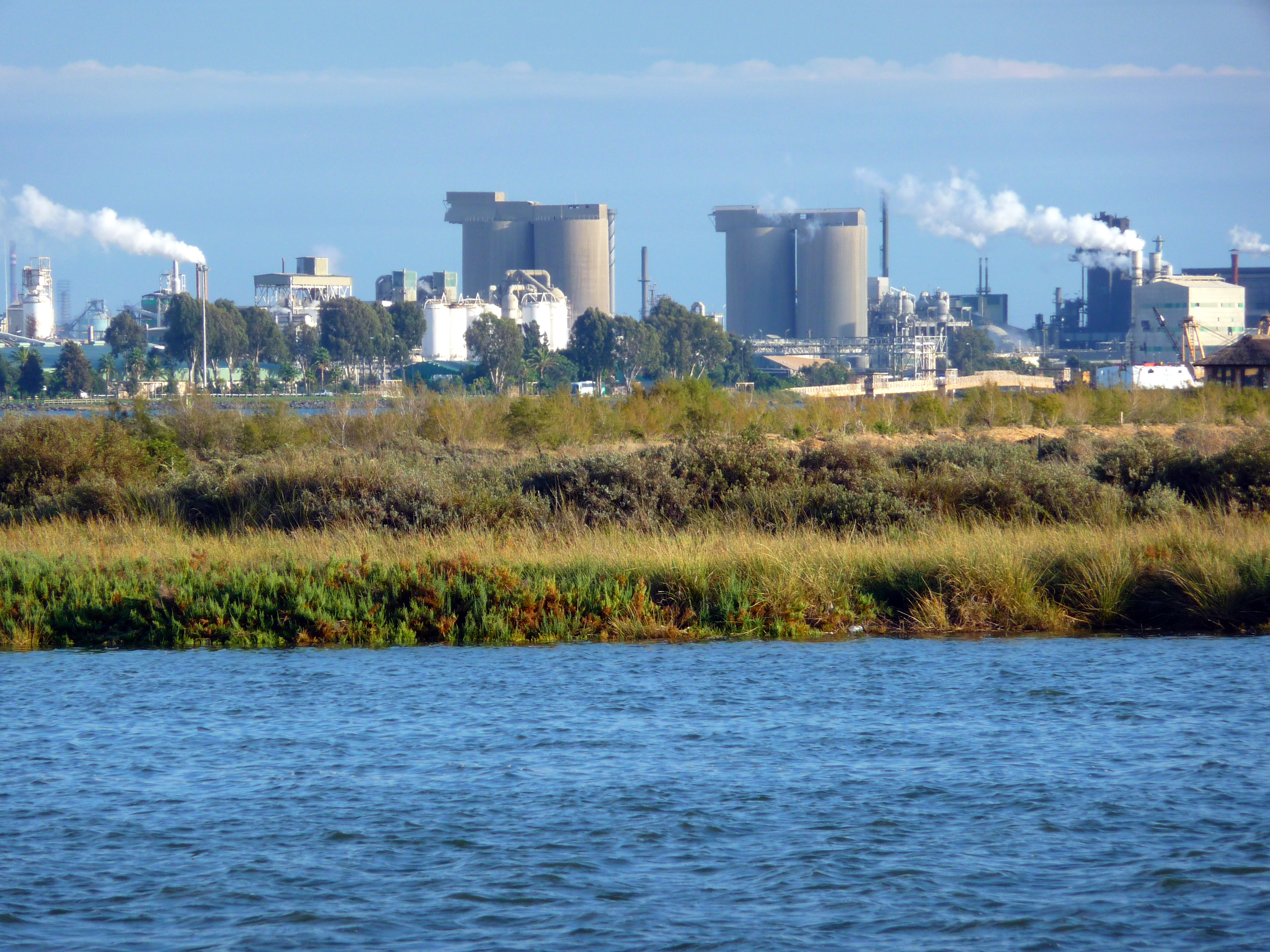
Facilities at Punta del Sebo.

The Chemical Park of Promotion and Development of Huelva (in Spanish: Polo Químico de Promoción y Desarrollo de Huelva), also known simply as the Chemical Park of Huelva or Chemical Pole of Huelva (Polo Químico de Huelva), is the name given to the group of facilities and infrastructures belonging to the petrochemical industry sector located in the province of Huelva (Spain), south of the provincial capital's urban center. The industrial complex was started up during the second half of the 20th century, covering various branches of production.

== History ==
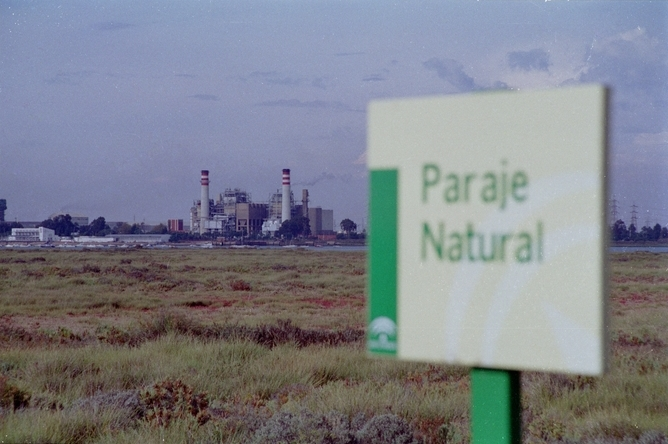
Image of the Chemical Pole from the natural area of Marismas del Odiel.

The province of Huelva has historically been an important mining center, to which was added its natural outlet to the sea through the Huelva estuary. The Riotinto and Tharsis-La Zarza mining basins have been especially important. Therefore, since prehistoric times the transit between the mining areas and the coast, generally through the Tinto River, was frequent. Already in the 19th century different mining companies, such as the Rio Tinto Company Limited or Tharsis Sulphur and Copper Company Limited, promoted a first industrialization in the area but it would not be until the 20th century when the proposals to develop these lands came to fruition.

The first intention to install an important industrial complex in Huelva was proposed in 1870 by José Monasterio Correa. (Note: In a report that the then inspector general of the Corps of Mining Engineers ―José Monasterio― made in 1870, the possibility of turning Huelva into an industrial complex that would exploit the mining resources of the Spanish Southwest was raised. To this end, he proposed the possibility of building a railway line linking Logrosán with Huelva through Mérida and Zafra. This was intended to provide an outlet to the hypothetical industrial center for phosphorites from the Logrosán mines, manganese from various mines in Huelva, pyrites from the Riotinto mines or lime from Niebla (Flores Caballero, 2017, pp. 151-154).) At the beginning of the 20th century, Francisco Montenegro Avenue was opened on the left bank of the Odiel River with the dredging of the same river to allow access to larger ships to the port of Huelva, especially to the mining docks of Tharsis and Rio Tinto. These lands were created as land for industrial use and were offered to the mining companies to develop their processing activity on them, without success initially, since the minerals continued to be exported without being transformed into metals or fertilizers.

It was not until 1964 when the Franco Government - during the mayoralty in the capital of Federico Molina - approved by decree of January 30, 1964 the construction of an Industrial Promotion Pole in these lands, which would change the geography, the population and the politics of the area in many aspects. Its installation in the area was due (among other aspects) to the high degree of underdevelopment and unemployment then existing in the area, and to the need to take advantage of the enormous and nearby mining production, thus making it possible for it to be worked and remain in the country. Companies such as the Compañía Española de Minas de Río Tinto (CEMRT) played an important role in the development of the Huelva Chemical Pole. In fact, CEMRT installed an electrolytic plant in the area to obtain pure copper, (Note: The untreated copper ore came from the Riotinto Mines owned by CEMRT, which was transported by the Riotinto railroad (Delgado, Campos, Narbona, 2009, p. 25).) as well as an oil refinery in the area of Palos de la Frontera, chemical production plants, etc. Years later, the Unión Explosivos Río Tinto (ERT) group, the successor of the former CEMRT, came to exercise an important predominance in the Chemical Pole.

Between the 1970s and 1980s, the Chemical Pole underwent a major expansion, which included the installation of new factories and various facilities. During those years, companies such as Río Gulf Petroquímica, Ertisa, Río Tinto Minera, Foret, Interquímica, Fosfórico Español, Odiel Química, Fertiberia, Derivados del Flúor, etc. were installed in the area. Later, after the industrial reconversion of the years 1980–1990, companies such as CLH, Atlantic Copper, Cepsa, Ence, FMC Foret or Repsol were installed. In the 1980s, the problem caused by pollution began to become evident, since by 1987 the plants of the Industrial Pole were dumping some 50,000 tons of sulfuric acid, 12,000 tons of heavy metals and 700,000 tons of sulfates into the Huelva estuary. Faced with the ecological degradation of the water and the serious environmental problem this caused, in 1987 the authorities drew up a Discharge Correction Plan to reverse this situation.

== Industrial areas ==
The different industrial facilities have ended up covering different spaces in the area:

- Francisco Montenegro Avenue to Punta del Sebo, the natural mouth of the Odiel and Tinto rivers.
- To join the banks of the Tinto River, a bridge was built for road and rail traffic, which at the time was the widest in Spain, from Punta del Sebo (Huelva) to the Outer Port (Palos de la Frontera), making possible the installation of most of the industries in this area.
- Old Seville road, in an area near San Juan del Puerto, where mainly companies related to the manufacture of cellulose were installed.

== Railway network ==
The Huelva Chemical Pole is linked to the Seville-Huelva line by a branch that connects with it through the so-called Las Metas junction (kilometer point 106.750). A short distance from the fork is the Huelva-Mercancías station, which has a marshalling yard for merchant trains. The branch line is of Iberian-gauge and is owned by the Huelva Port Authority. Within the Hub there is a 32-kilometer network of railroad tracks that covers the industrial zones and the outer port of Huelva.

== Economic and social impact ==
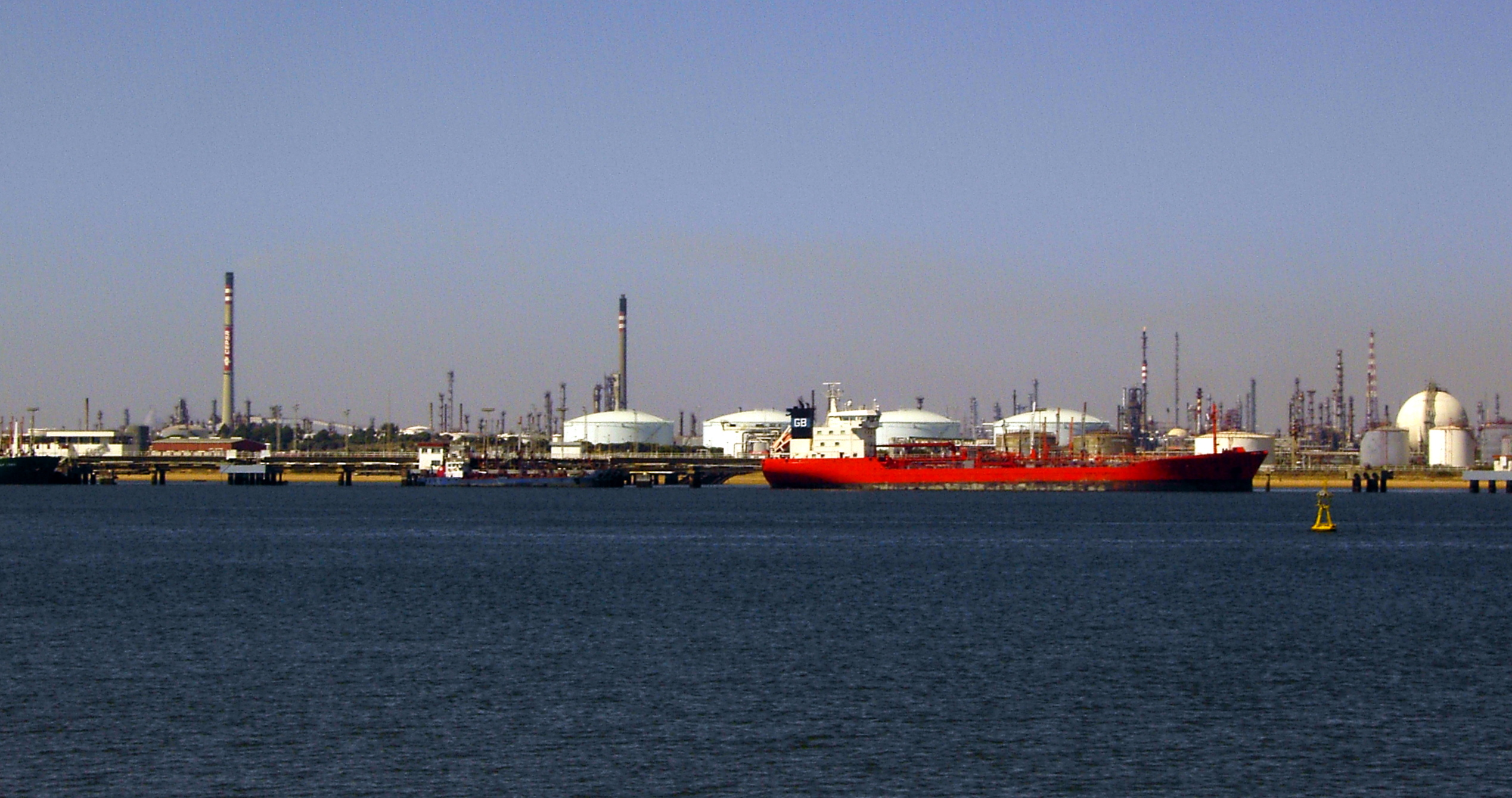
Outer port of the Pole.

Since the Chemical Pole came into service, the city and nearby towns have been linked to the chemical industry, oil refining, natural gas, petrochemicals, biofuels, logistics, copper metallurgy and power plants. At present, the cluster contributes an important part of the provincial GDP and more than 15,000 jobs. With more than 1,500 hectares, it is the second largest industrial complex in the country, with numerous companies installed, most of them grouped in the Asociación de Industrias Químicas, Básicas y Energéticas de Huelva (AIQBE), which generate 6,000 direct jobs.

In another sense, some environmental groups have denounced serious associated diseases, as well as a significant ecological setback in the area, indicating that the province of Huelva is located in the area known as the "triangle of death" or "ground zero". This area is made up of the provinces of Cádiz, Huelva and Seville.

According to the mortality map of Spain, "we see a higher mortality rate in the south than in the north of Spain. This reflects, in part, socioeconomic inequality", a difference that lies in diseases associated with socioeconomic inequalities. Initial studies by the National Epidemiology Center of the Carlos III Health Institute, Greenpeace or the Pompeu Fabra University seemed to indicate that the cancer rate in this province is the highest in Spain, indicating that the risk of cancer is 50% higher than in the rest of Spain. For its part, an initial study by the Huelva Environmental Quality Plan, coordinated by the CSIC, indicated that, due to causes that could be attributed to poverty, food, smoking or pollution, in Huelva there is an excess of cancer mortality in the order of 10% for men and 6% for women, compared to the Andalusian average.

However, subsequent studies show that the incidence of cancer in the province is within the national and regional average, as stated by Health officials of the Andalusian Regional Government and observed in the annual data of the National Epidemiology Center, clarifying that these levels are not attributable to industrial activity.

=== The phosphogypsum ===
As a result of the activities of Fertiberia, and to a lesser extent of FMC Foret, another 1,200 ha are indirectly occupied by the Chemical Pole. These are the phosphogypsum ponds, which are located some 700 meters from the Pérez Cubillas neighborhood in Huelva and two kilometers from the center of the capital, next to which a thousand homes and a commercial park have been built. The phosphogypsum ponds of the Huelva Chemical Pole are made up of less than 80 million tons of this material, compared to the more than 3,000 million tons currently piled up in Europe and the world.

Phosphogypsum is the by-product of the wet production of phosphoric acid in the Fertiberia and FMC Foret plants, which treated phosphoric rock from various places such as South Africa, Israel, Algeria, Tunisia, Morocco, Togo or Senegal with sulfuric acid, obtaining phosphoric acid as a product and gypsum (phosphogypsum) as a by-product. This activity stopped in 2010 and since that date there is no discharge in these ponds, and the company Fertiberia is waiting for the administrative permits to start the works of the restoration project designed following the indications of the National Court and the competent Ministries at the time, which already ruled -in a final judgment- that the phosphogypsum would not be moved to another place.

Greenpeace denounced that the cancer rate in Huelva is the highest in Spain and that the phosphogypsum ponds emit radiation 27 times higher than what is allowed. However, subsequent studies, cited above, show that cancer in Huelva is within the average values for Spain and Andalusia. Regarding radioactivity, the Nuclear Safety Council, in all its studies and reports (including those destined to Congress and the Senate), indicates that there is no radiological risk in Huelva or in the phosphogypsum ponds.

== See also ==
- Port of Huelva

== Bibliography ==
- Delgado, Aquilino; Campos, Ángel; Narbona, Saúl (2009). "The Río Tinto railway. Breve reseña histórica". Ferrocarril turístico minero (in Spanish) (Aquilino Delgado Domínguez ed.). Universidad de Huelva: 17–26.
- Flores Caballero, Manuel (2017). La nacionalización de las minas de Río Tinto y la formación de la compañía española (in Spanish). Huelva: Servicio de publicaciones de la Universidad de Huelva.
- Fourneau, Francis (1980). Huelva hacia el desarrollo: evolución de la provincia de Huelva durante los veinte últimos años (in Spanish). Diputación de Huelva/Instituto de Estudios Onubenses «Padre Marchena».
- Grande Gil, José Antonio (2016). Drenaje ácido de mina en la faja pirítica ibérica: técnicas de estudio e inventario de explotaciones (in Spanish). Universidad de Huelva.
- Jiménez, Miguel (2016). "El Puerto de Huelva y el ferrocarril: del mineral a la intermodalidad" (PDF). Vía Libre, la revista del ferrocarril (in Spanish) (610). Fundación de los Ferrocarriles Españoles: 28–36. ISSN 1134-1416.
- Mojarro Bayo, Ana María (2006). "El ferrocarril y el puerto de Huelva". Los ferrocarriles en la provincia de Huelva: Un recorrido por el pasado (in Spanish) (Emilio Romero Macías ed.). Universidad de Huelva: 439–466.
- Sánchez Domínguez, María Ángeles (2001). Instrumentación de la política económica regional en Andalucía, 1946-2000 (in Spanish). Granada: Universidad de Granada.
- Tamames, Ramón (1992). Estructura Económica de España (in Spanish). Alianza Editorial.

=== Additional bibliography ===
- Menéndez Rodríguez, Constantino (1984). "La Industria en Huelva" (PDF). Boletín económico de Andalucía (in Spanish) (5). Sevilla: Junta de Andalucía: 53–58. ISSN 0212-6621.
