= Empalme-La Zarza line =

Railway branch line in Huelva, Spain

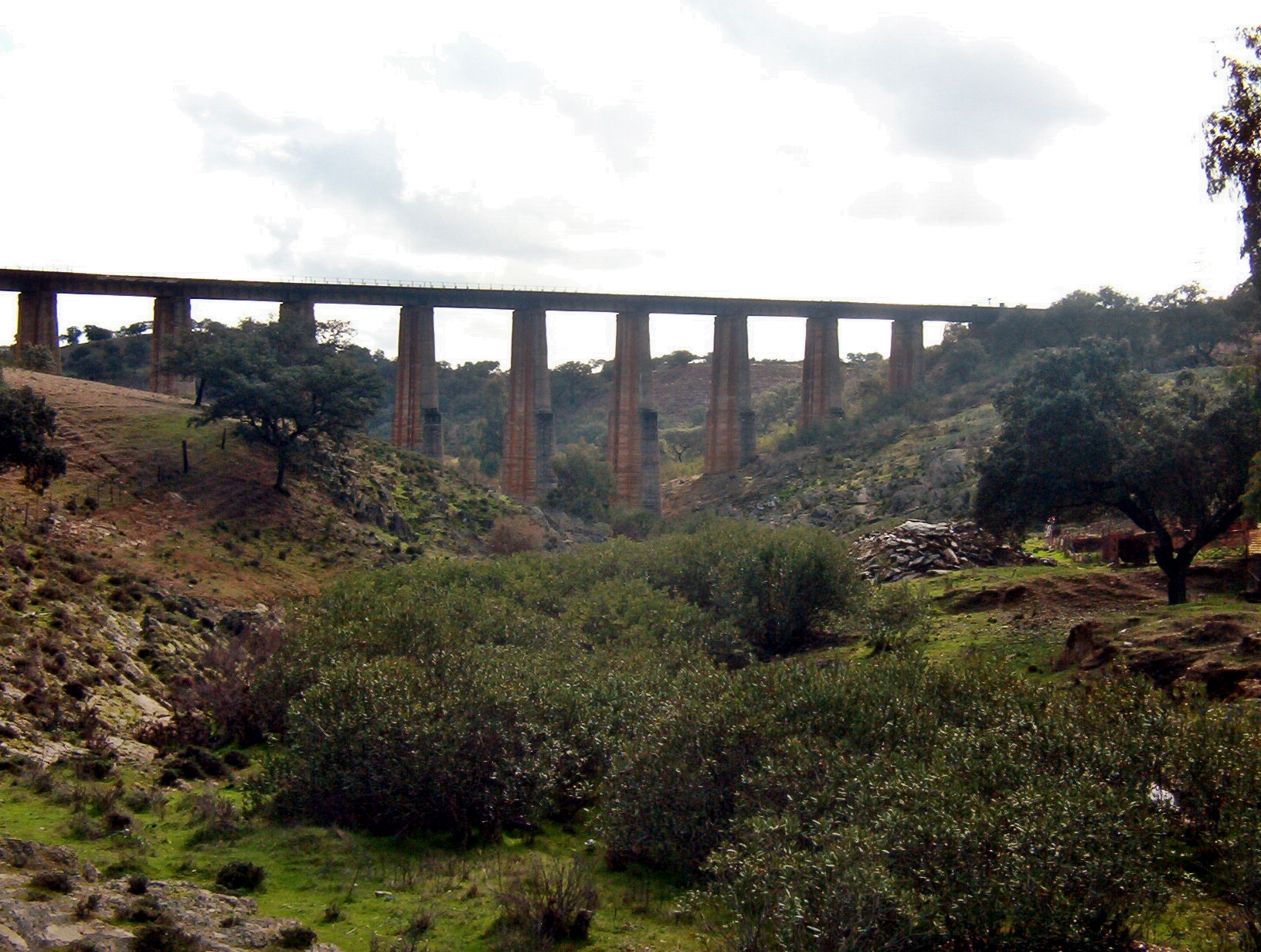
- Cascabelero Bridge, belonging to the branch line.

Overview
- Transit type: Rail transport

Operation
- Began operation: 1888
- Ended operation: 1992

Technical
- System length: 30 km
- Track gauge: 1220 mm; Narrow-gauge

The Empalme-La Zarza line was a railway branch line that connected the facilities of the La Zarza mine to the general track of the Tharsis Railway, in the province of Huelva (Spain). This small railroad was in operation for just over a century, between 1888 and 1992, and its main traffic was freight. The line was about 30 kilometers long and had a gauge of 1220 millimeters. (Note: Although other sources indicate that the branch line had a length of 28 706 kilometers.)

== History ==
In the 1880s, a branch line was built to connect the La Zarza mine to the general Tharsis Railway line to transport the mined ore to the Huelva estuary. The work, carried out by the Tharsis Sulphur and Copper Company Limited, was more complex than the general line due to the geographical features of the region. The new line was inaugurated in 1888. Its commissioning resulted in a significant increase of ore traffic on the entire railway, and the activity on this section was focused mainly on the circulation of freight trains. In May 1991, due to the serious crisis in the mines, the branch line was closed to traffic and in 1992 it was closed again. Finally, in 1996, the line was dismantled to allow the construction of a road in the area.

== Layout and features ==
The line had a hard profile due to the orography of the area, with slopes of up to 22 thousandths, which made it necessary to carry out numerous masonry works and to build sections in trenches. About twenty bridges and pontoons were built, the longest being the viaduct over the Cascabelero stream (136 meters). A series of intermediate stations were built along the line—Villanueva de las Cruces, El Jaroso, La Zarza—whose purpose was to regulate the traffic of passing trains. The connection to the main line was made at the Empalme station, which became a railway junction. The layout used a track gauge of 1220 millimeters, an exceptional case in Spain.

== Bibliography ==
- Flores Caballero, Manuel (2011). Las fuerzas de la revolución industrial en la fiebre minera del XIX [The forces of the industrial revolution in the mining fever of the nineteenth century] (in Spanish). Juan Manuel Flores Jimeno Research Foundation.
- León Vela, José; Martínez Roldán, Nieves (2001). La reconversión de áreas industriales obsoletas [Conversion of obsolete industrial areas] (in Spanish). Vol. I. University of Seville.
- Rábano, Isabel; Manteca, Ignacio; García, Cristóbal (2003). Patrimonio geológico y minero y desarrollo regional [Geological and mining heritage and regional development] (in Spanish). Madrid: Geological and Mining Institute of Spain.
- Sánchez, Francisco (2006). "El ferrocarril Tharsis-Río Odiel" [The Tharsis-Río Odiel Railroad]. Los ferrocarriles en la provincia de Huelva: Un recorrido por el pasado [Railroads in the province of Huelva: A journey through the past] (in Spanish). In: Emilio Romero Macías (dir.). University of Huelva: 207–227.
- Various Authors (2006). "Introducción" [Introduction]. Los ferrocarriles en la provincia de Huelva: Un recorrido por el pasado [Railroads in the province of Huelva: A journey through the past] (in Spanish). University of Huelva: 17–28.
