= Iberian Pyrite Belt =

Geographical area

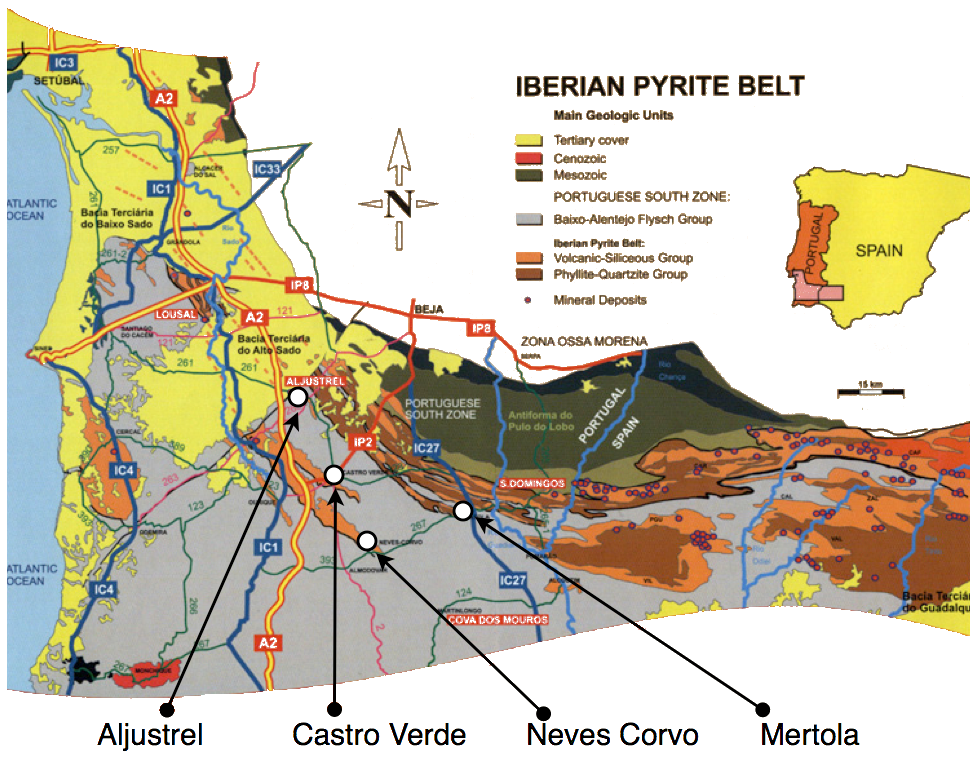
Iberian Pyrite Belt

The Iberian Pyrite Belt is a vast geographical area with particular geological features that stretches along much of the south of the Iberian Peninsula, from Portugal to Spain. It is about 250 km long and 30–50 km wide, running northwest to southeast from Alcácer do Sal (Portugal) to Sevilla (Spain). The mining activity in this region goes back thousands of years.

The Iberian Pyrite Belt has had more than 2000 million tons of ore removed, and still has more than 400 million left to exploit. It is the largest concentration of massive sulfides in the world.

== Formation ==
The Iberian Pyrite Belt was formed 350 million years ago in the Devonian Period, connected to active and hydrothermal volcanism that led to the formation of a volcanic-sedimentary complex. Volcanic activity in the region led to eight giant volcanogenic massive sulfide ore deposits (VMS) associated with polymetallic massive flanks of volcanic cones in the form of pyrite, and also chalcopyrite, sphalerite, galena and cassiterite. The deposits of the Iberian Pyrite Belt are notable examples of volcanic- and sediment-hosted massive sulfide (VSHMS) deposits, which hybrids between the VMS and SEDEX deposits. Over 250 deposits are known in the belt.

== Mining ==
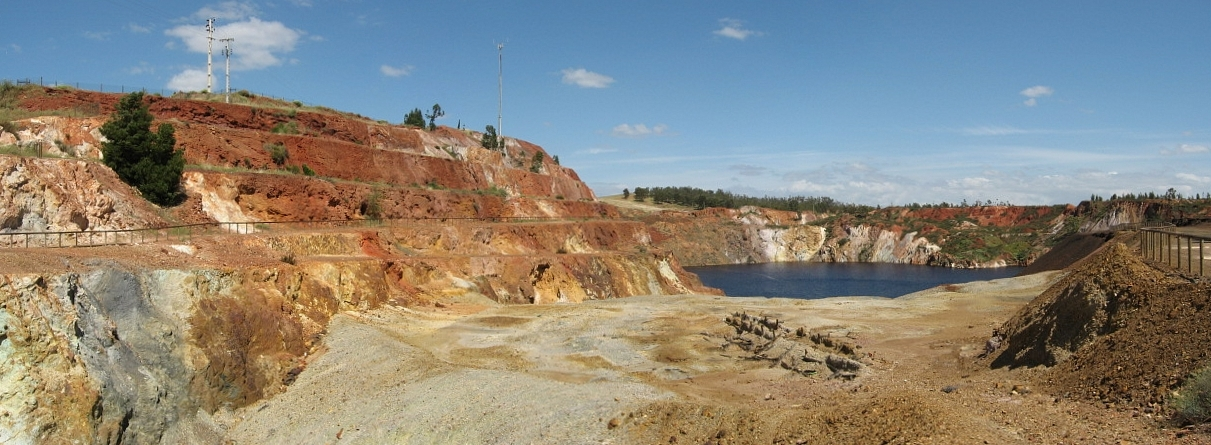
São Domingos Mine

From the eighth century BC, there was mining in the area but it was the Romans who exploited the mines with greater intensity, thanks to its strategic position on the Mediterranean. This southern area of Lusitania, a Roman province for several centuries, was an abundant source of mineral ore which included gold, silver, copper, tin, lead, and iron. Given its mineral riches, the area played a significant role in the expansion of Roman metallurgy. During the Roman period, extensive mining and storage of valuable minerals required protective fortifications and mineral warehouses. This physiographic region contains many areas that contain large concentrations of ore and areas of extreme environmental conditions such as the Rio Tinto River.

=== Small structures ===
There are remains of more than 20 such small structures in the Portuguese Castro Verde territory. A mining transportation route that existed between the mines of Aljustrel 20 km to the north and the port city of Mértola 40 km to the east, is situated on the Guadiana river.

The São Domingos Mine and Riotinto mines accounted for one of the bases of the economy in the area. While in the Middle Ages there was a decline in the mining industry, in the Industrial Revolution it intensified again, especially from the late nineteenth century when dozens of mines operated, primarily producing pyrite. Removal of sulfur remained significant until the 1950s because of its application in the chemical industry (production of sulfuric acid). At present, this mining area is in decline. The economic viability depends on the extraction of copper, zinc, lead and, in some cases, precious metals like gold and silver. The São Domingos Mine is now a deserted open-pit pyrite mine in Alentejo, Portugal.

== See also ==
- Riotinto-Nerva mining basin
- Tharsis-La Zarza mining basin
