= Tharsis, Huelva =

Tharsis
- Village
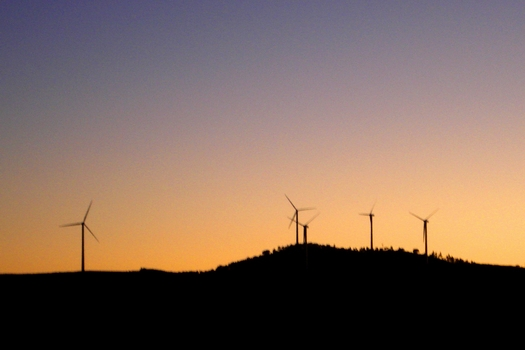
- Wind turbines in Tharsis

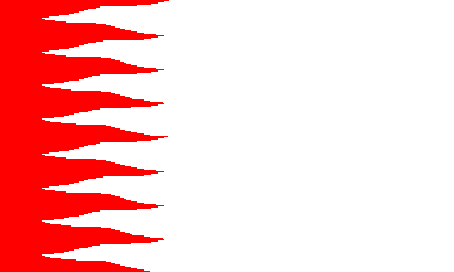
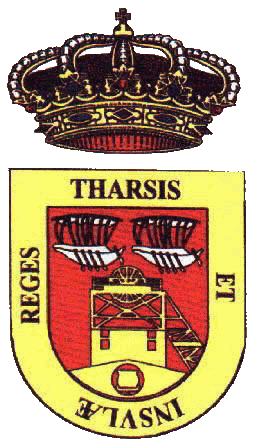
- Flag Seal

- Location in Spain
- Coordinates: 37°35′59″N 7°7′16″W
- Country: Spain
- Region: Andalusia
- Province: Huelva
- Comarca: Andévalo
- Municipality: Alosno

Government
  - Mayor: Lorenzo Gómez Volante (PSOE)
- Elevation: 265 m (869 ft)

Population (2013)
  - Total: 1,840
- Demonym: Tharsileño
- Time zone: UTC+1 (CET)
  - Summer (DST): UTC+2 (CEST)
- Postal code: 21530

Tharsis is a village that is part of the Alosno municipality in the province of Huelva, Spain. According to the 2013 census, the village has a population of 1,840 inhabitants.

== Mining ==
Tharsis is a mining town where the Filón Sur Mine, known for its fine goethite specimens, is located.

=== Filon Sur Mine ===
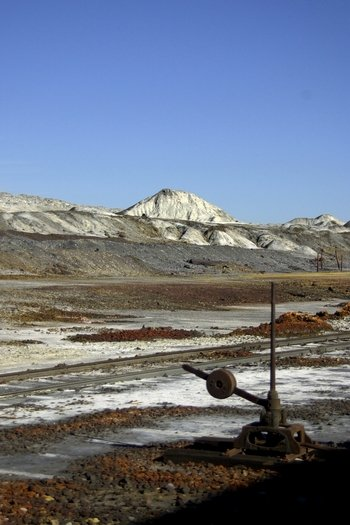

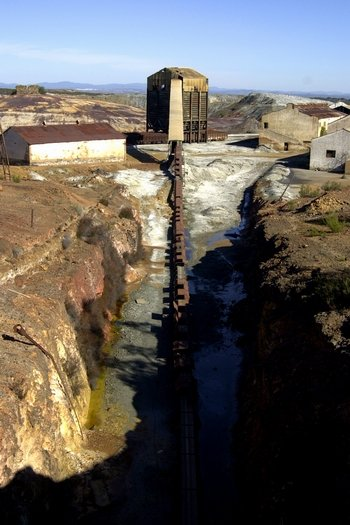

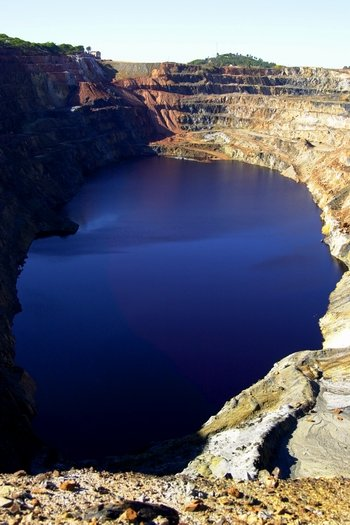
The Lagunazo

== See also ==
- Alosno
- Compañía Española de Minas de Tharsis
- Nueva Tharsis
- Tharsis Sulphur and Copper Company Limited
- Tharsis-La Zarza mining basin
- Tharsis railway line
