= La Zarza mine =

Mine in Andalusia, Spain

Coordinates: 37°42′58″N 6°51′00″W

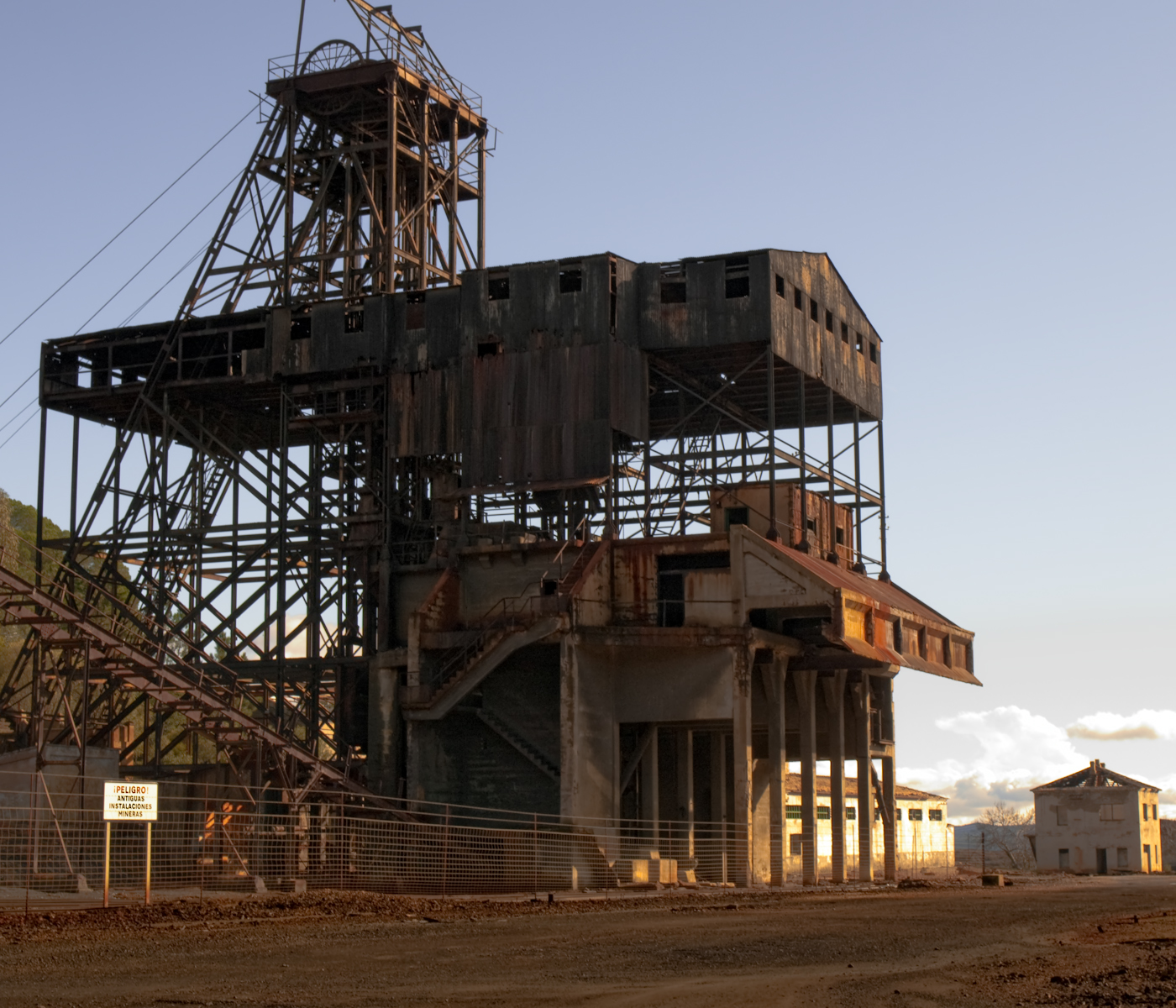

La Zarza mine is an abandoned mine near the town of La Zarza-Perrunal, Huelva, Andalusia, Spain. The deposit is part of the Spanish part of the Iberian Pyrite Belt. The orebody is 2,900 meters long and up to 100 meters thick. Like most of the volcanogenic massive sulfide ore deposit in the IPB it contains significant amounts of copper, zinc, lead, silver and gold.

The first indications for mining go back to 1500 BC. The mine was operated by the Romans from 100 AD till 300 AD. After that time the mining activities stopped and the deposit was rediscovered in the 19th century and the mine was opened in 1853. The ore output in the mid-1970s was 600,000 t/year. The mine closed in 1996 and the underground levels were flooded.

== See also ==
- Tharsis-La Zarza mining basin
- Empalme-La Zarza line
