= Odiel =

River in Spain

Coordinates: 37°16′15″N 6°57′53″W

Odiel River
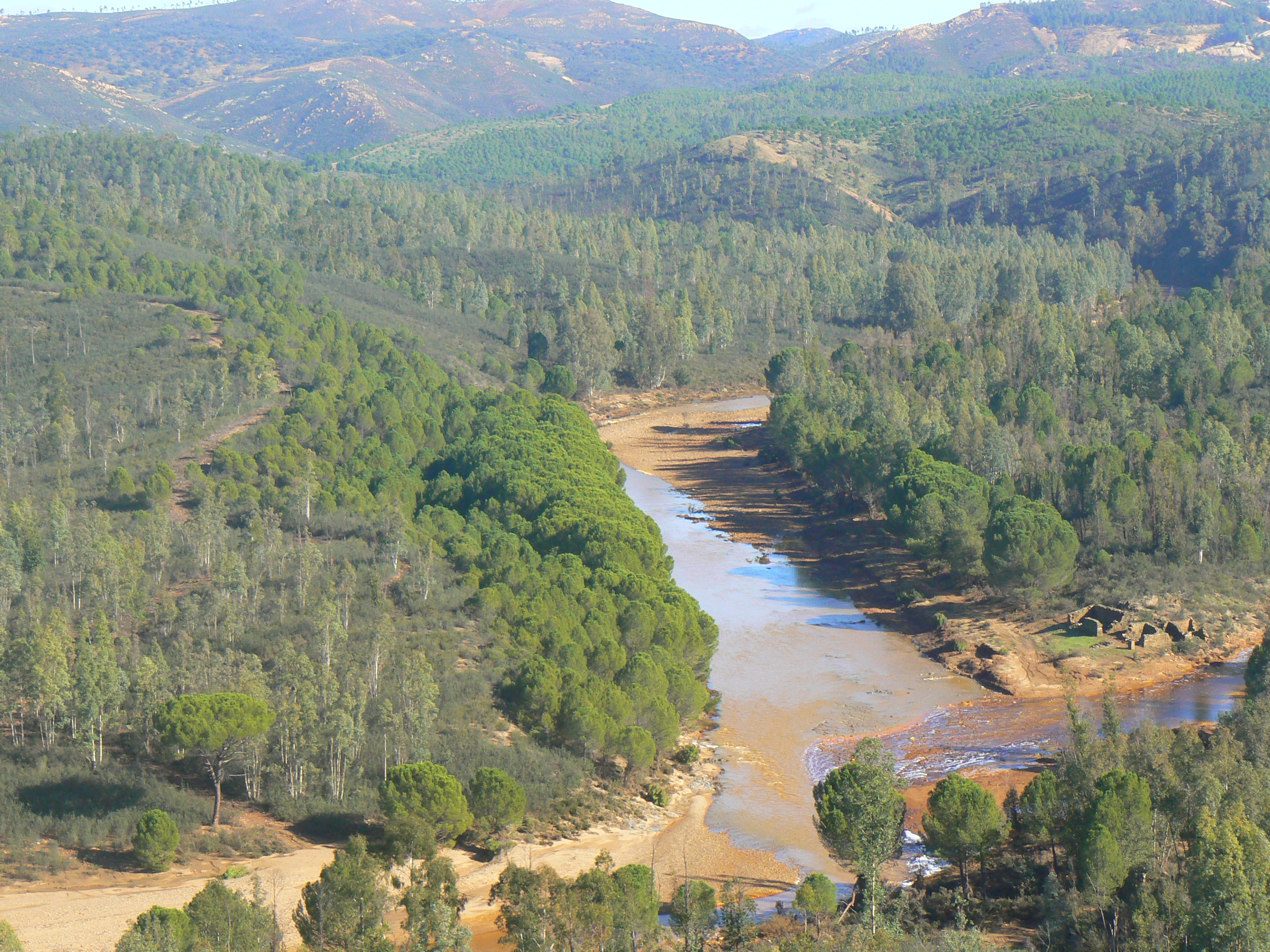
- View of the Odiel River

Location
- Country: Spain

Physical characteristics
- Source
  - location: Sierra de Aracena
  - elevation: 660 metres (2,170 ft)
- Mouth
  - location: Huelva Estuary
  - elevation: 0 metres (0 ft)
- Basin size: Tinto - Odiel

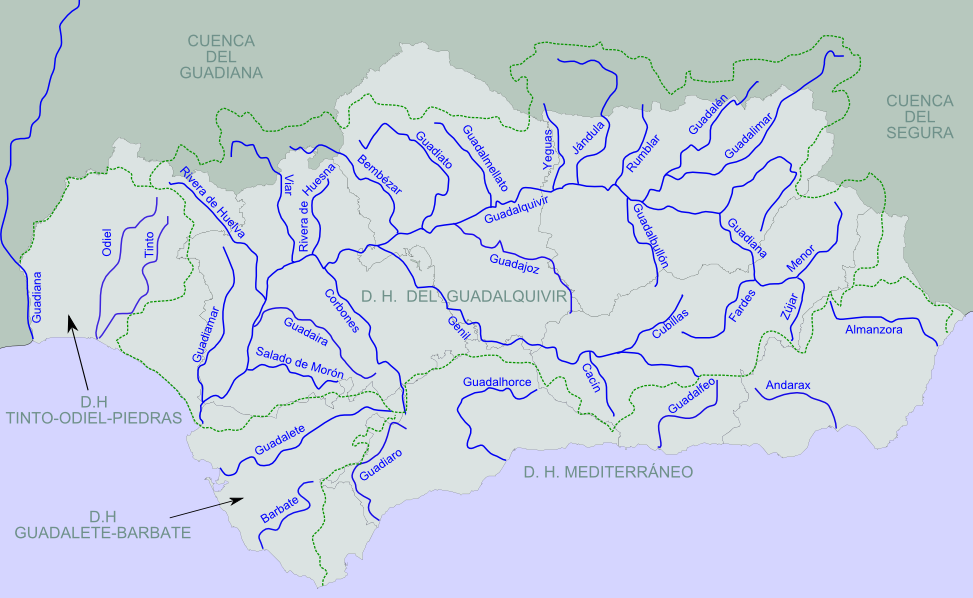
Rivers of Andalusia. The Odiel is near the left, between the Guadiana (along the Portuguese border) and the Rio Tinto.

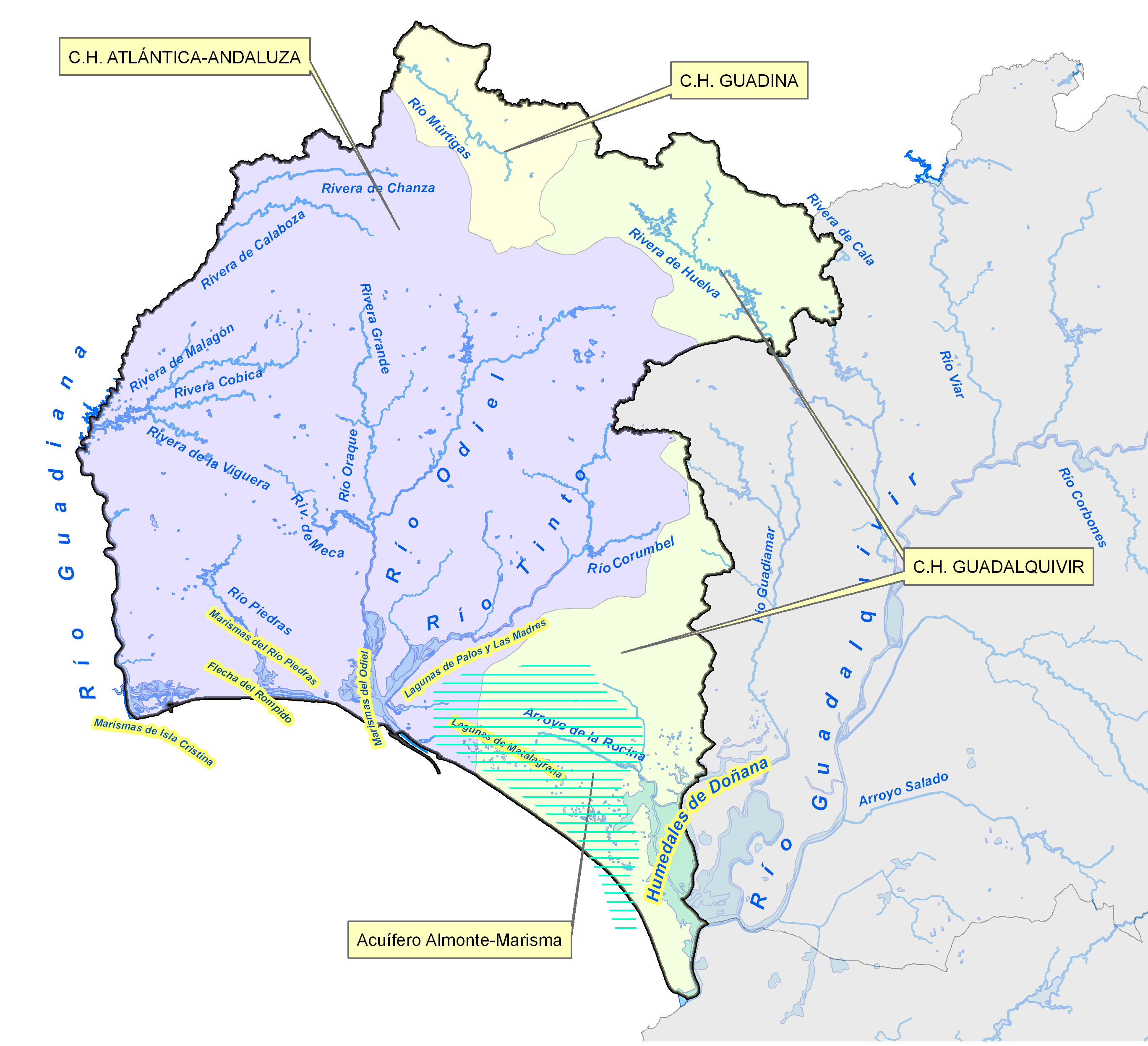
Hydrographic map of the province of Huelva. The Odiel is somewhat left of center, running roughly north-south.

The Odiel (Spanish: Río Odiel) is a river in the Atlantic basin in southern Spain, more precisely in the province of Huelva, Andalusia. It originates at Marimateos in the Sierra de Aracena at an elevation of 660 metres (2,170 ft) above sea level. At the Punta del Sebo, it joins the Rio Tinto to form the Huelva Estuary. Its principal tributaries are the Escalada, Meca, Olivargas, Oraque, Santa Eulalia, and El Villar. Its basin covers 990 square kilometres (380 sq mi).

In Roman times it was known as the Urius, although some scholars have proposed to identify the Odiel with another ancient name normally associated with the Río Tinto (Luxia). Even before the Romans, its mouth was an important place of commerce, as can be seen by archaeological remnants from Phoenicians and Ancient Greeks, known as the "Huelva Estuary Deposit" (Spanish: Depósito de la Ría de Huelva), dated 1000 BCE.

== See also ==
- List of rivers of Spain
