= Tharsis Sulphur and Copper Company Limited =

- Company type: Limited
- Industry: Mining, chemicals
- Founded: 1866
- Defunct: 2006
- Headquarters: Glasgow, Tharsis

The Tharsis Sulphur and Copper Company Limited (TOS) was a British mining company that operated in Spain during the 19th and 20th centuries, dedicated to the extraction and commercialization of pyrites. Throughout its existence, it exploited several deposits located in the Tharsis-La Zarza mining basin.

Established in 1866 by Scottish businessmen, over the years it became one of the main mining companies in the province of Huelva and one of the main pyrite-producing companies in Spain. The TOS owned a railway line that connected the mines with the Huelva estuary, where it built a wharf-pier to facilitate the unloading and transport of the mineral by sea. Likewise, the company had a great influence in the region. In the 1970s, the Tharsis deposits and facilities passed into Spanish hands, although the company continued to operate as one of the main pyrite traders in the West. The company was finally dissolved in 2006.

== See also ==
- Compañía Española de Minas de Tharsis
