= Río Tinto =

River in Spain coloured red

Río Tinto Tinto River
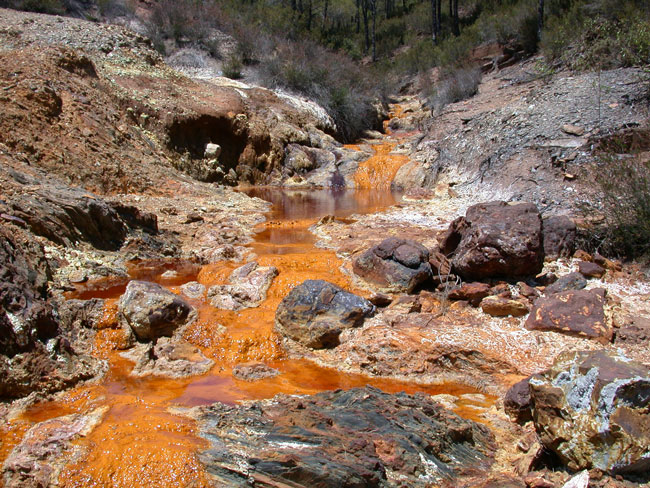
- Rio Tinto

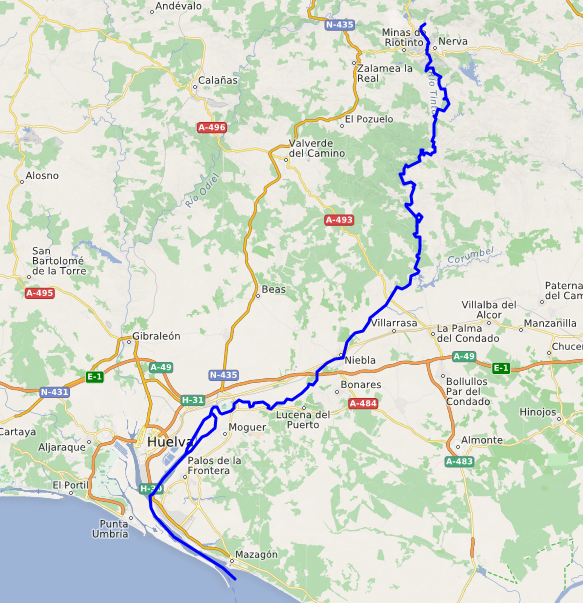
- Course of the Rio Tinto

Location
- Country: Spain
- Region: Andalusia

Physical characteristics
- Source: Sierra Morena
  - location: Andalusia
- Mouth
  - location: Gulf of Cádiz
  - coordinates: 37.21°N 6.938°W
- Length: 100 km (62 mi)
- Discharge
  - location: Huelva

The Río Tinto (Spanish pronunciation: [ˈri.o ˈtinto], red river or Tinto River) is a highly toxic river in southwestern Spain that rises in the Sierra Morena mountains of Andalusia. It flows generally south-southwest, reaching the Gulf of Cádiz at Huelva. The Río Tinto river has a unique red and orange colour derived from its extremely acidic chemical makeup with very high levels of iron and heavy metals. The name río tinto means "coloured river" in Spanish, in contrast to most rivers, which are clear. However, "tinto" is also an expression for red wine in Spain, so it is also related to this second meaning.

The river maintains its colour for approximately 50 kilometres. After 50 kilometres, its unique chemistry appears to slowly subside, along with the odd colouring. The acidic content of the river is altered near the town of Niebla. The acid begins to be neutralized past the town of Niebla as the Río Tinto blends with other streams flowing into the Atlantic Ocean. The river is approximately 100 km (62 mi) long and is located within the Iberian Pyrite Belt. This area has large amounts of ore and sulphide deposits.

The Río Tinto area has had approximately 5,000 years of ore mining, including copper, silver, gold, and other minerals, extracted as far as 20 kilometres from the river shores. As a possible result of the mining, the Río Tinto is very acidic (pH 2) with its deep reddish hue due to iron dissolved in the water. Acid mine drainage from the mines leads to severe environmental problems because the acidity (low pH) dissolves heavy metals into the water. It is not clear how much acid drainage is from natural processes and how much has come from mining. There are severe environmental concerns over the river pollution.

Although the river is a harsh environment, some microorganisms classified as extremophiles do thrive in these conditions. Such life forms include certain species of bacteria, algae and heterotrophs.

== History ==
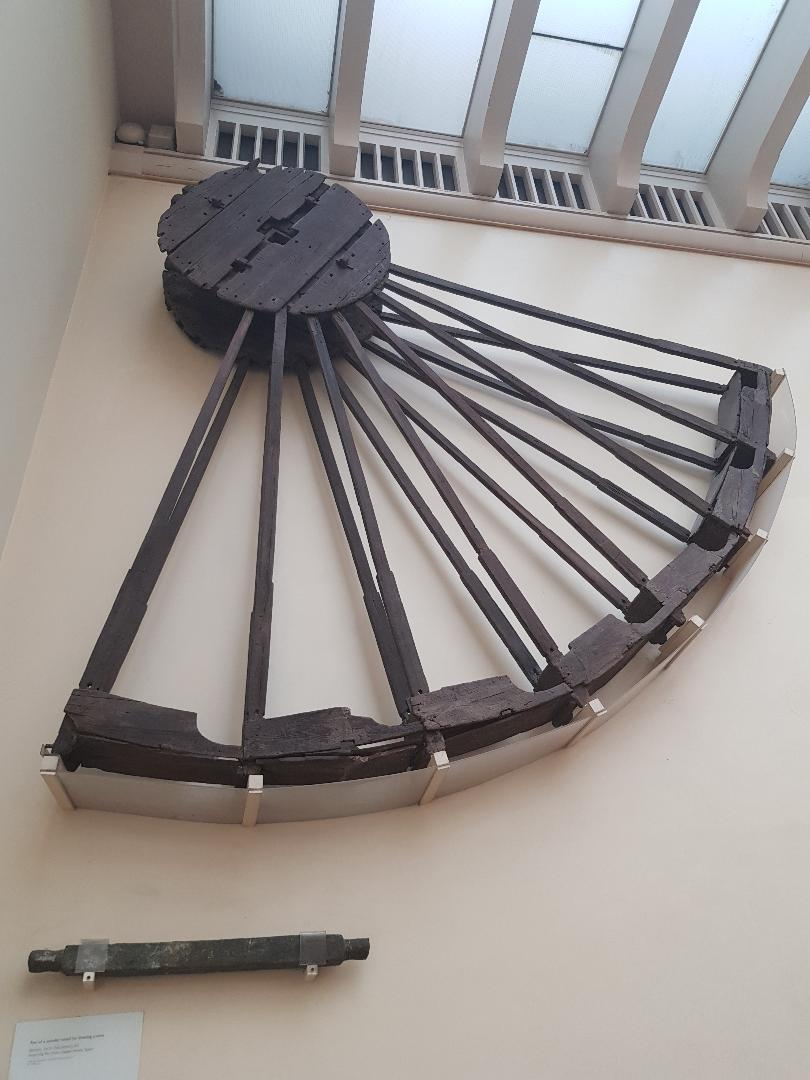
Roman wooden wheel for extracting water from deep Rio Tinto mines and now in the British Museum (1st-2nd Centuries AD)

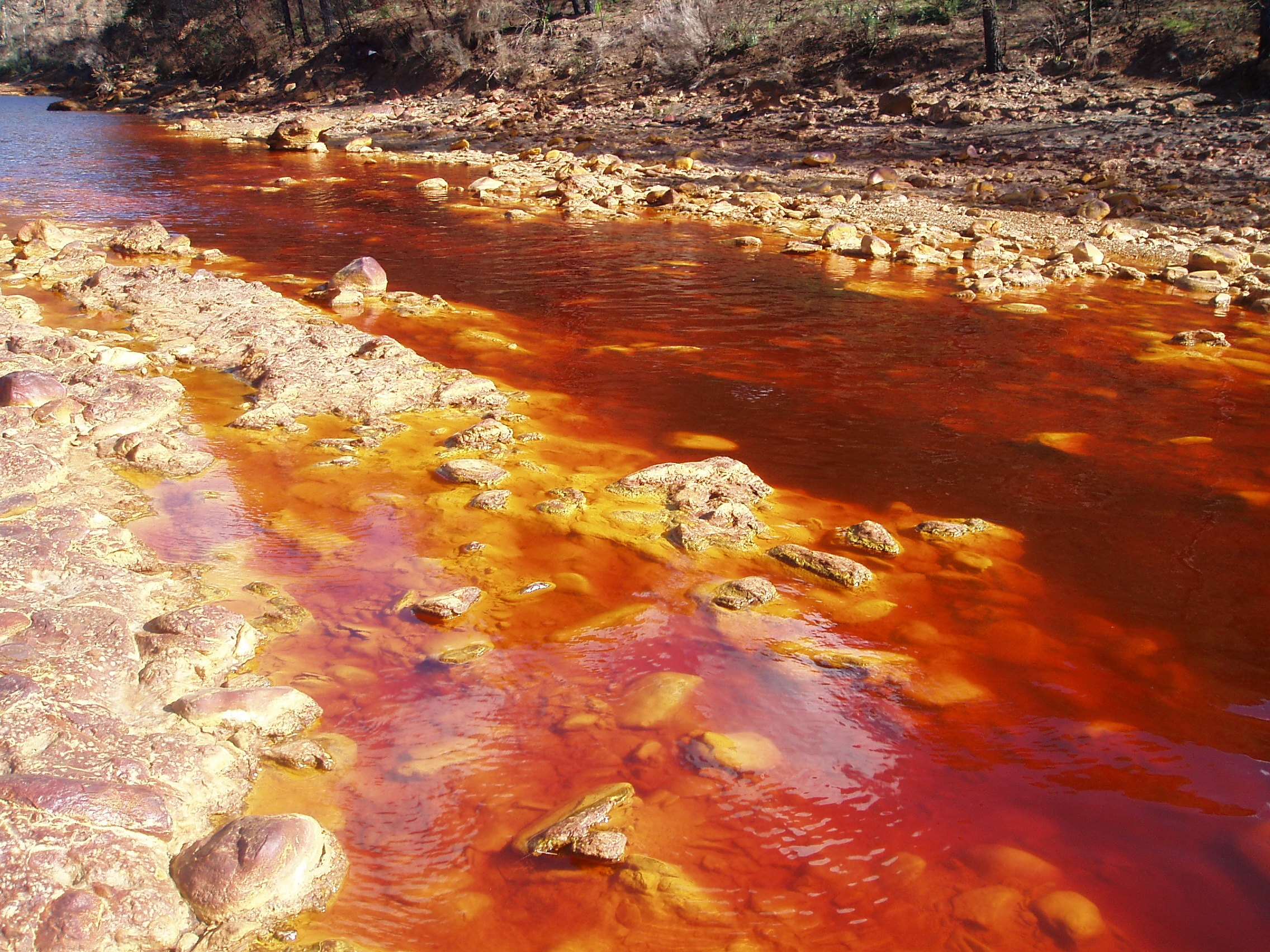
The Río Tinto in 2006

The ore body was deposited during the Carboniferous period (300–350 Ma) by hydrothermal activities on the sea floor. The history of mining in the Río Tinto area traces back to the Tartessans and the Iberians starting mining in 3000 BC, followed by the Phoenicians, Greeks, Romans, Visigoths, and Moors. The Río Tinto region has been the source of approximately 5,000 years of ore extraction, and chemical refinement primarily for copper, silver and gold, and later for iron, manganese and other minerals. This long standing mining activity has vastly modified the topography of the region.

After a period of abandonment and disuse, the mines were rediscovered in 1556 and the Spanish government began operating them once again in 1724. In the 19th century, companies from the United Kingdom started large-scale mining operations. In 1873, the Río Tinto Company was formed to operate the mines. Production declined after the peak of production in 1930, and it ended in 1986 for copper mining and in 1996 for silver and gold mining, with remaining activities completely ceasing in 2001.

Increased copper prices in the 2010s led to efforts by EMED Mining (now known as Atalaya Mining) to reopen the mine, but difficulties in acquiring all necessary property rights, environmental concerns, and obtaining regulatory approval delayed reopening. The mine, which employed as many as 20,000 in the past, would employ 350 people during its startup phase. Environmental concerns are centred on long disused water reservoirs which might not be able to withstand the stress of renewed waste inputs. Despite these issues, the permit was ultimately granted in January 2015 and commercial production of copper restarted in February 2016.

== Origin and ecology ==
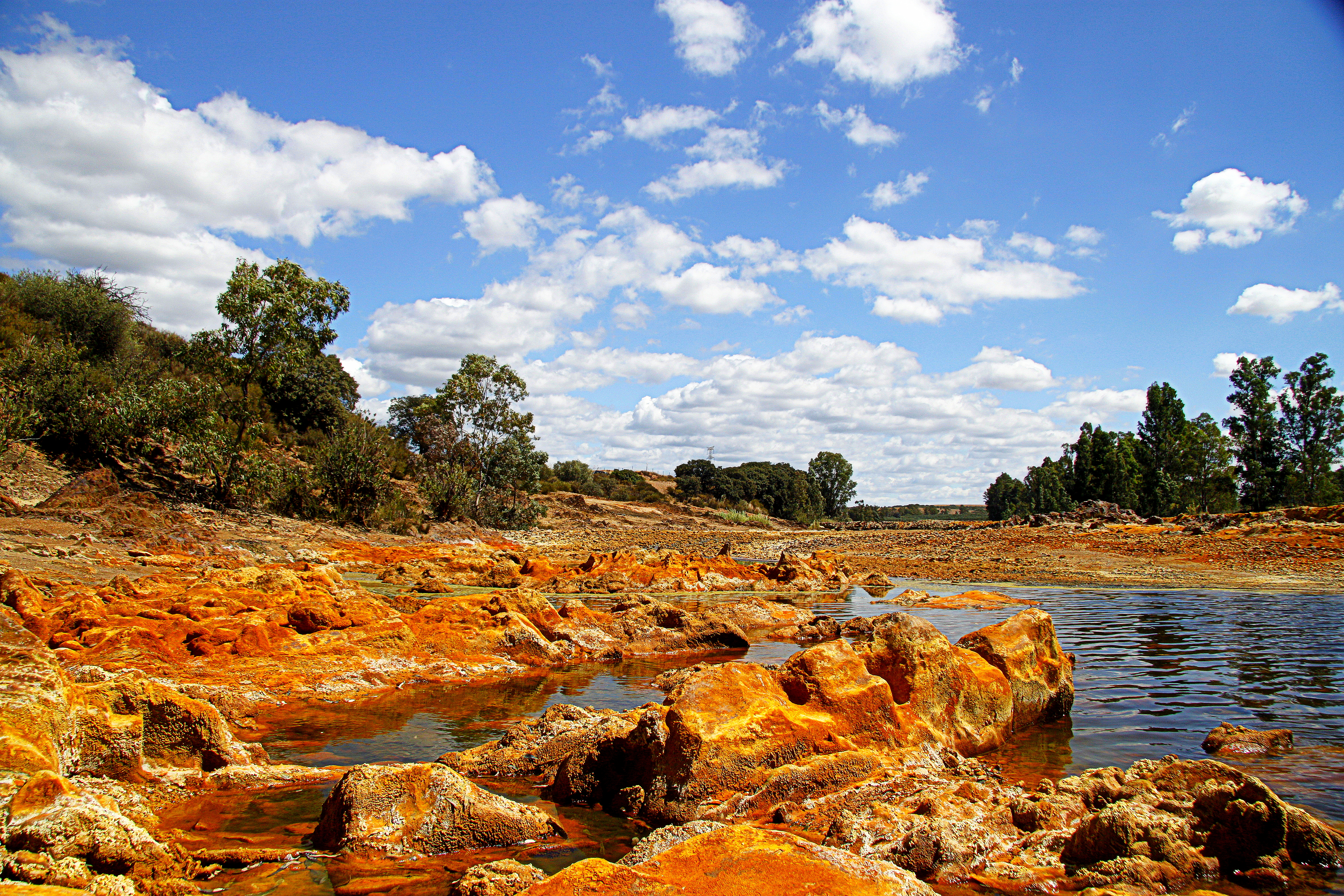
Río Tinto river

Due to the extreme conditions of the river, there is very little in the way of life, with the exception of small amounts of microorganisms, including algae. The presence of anaerobic bacteria in the sediments is thought to contribute somewhat to the river's famously low pH (acidity), that in turn increases the concentration of dissolved heavy metals. The waters from the Río Tinto, high in metal sulphides, provide an ideal environment for chemolithoautotrophic microorganisms, with the sulphides acting as a food source. The product of metal sulphide metabolism through oxidization is ferric iron and secretion of acidic liquid.

The continuation of this process for an extended period of time is thought by some scientists to be responsible for keeping the river's pH between 2 and 2.5 in most areas. Even in the extremely acidic water, both red and green algae have been observed to thrive in relatively high concentrations. Despite algae levels in the Río Tinto accounting for over half of the total biomass in the river, algae is understood to have minimal effects on the characteristics of the complex ecosystem.

The discovery of multiple oxide terraces mediated by microorganisms at up to 60 metres above the current water level, and as far away as 20 kilometres from the current river's path, may suggest that the unusual ecosystem is a natural phenomenon since before human mining activities started in this region. On the other hand, it is known that toxic water emanates from these vast underground and open pit mines and chemical ore refinement that had been active off and on for thousands of years. While it is still undetermined if the unique water chemistry of the Río Tinto developed as a result of thousands of years of mining or by natural causes, it is possible that the river's chemical makeup is due to the combination of both natural causes and acid mine drainage. The river drains an area with huge deposits of sulphides which was formed more than 350 million years ago. When sulphides are exposed to air, water, and microorganisms, drainage from acidic rocks flows into surface and ground water. Mining, however, greatly increases exposed areas.

== Astrobiology ==
This river has gained recent scientific interest due to the presence of extremophile anaerobic bacteria that dwell in the acidic water. The subsurface rocks on the river bed contain iron and sulphide minerals on which the bacteria feed. The extreme conditions in the river may be analogous to other locations in the Solar System thought to contain liquid water, such as groundwater on Mars. Scientists have also directly compared the chemistry of the water in which the Mars rocks of Meridiani Planum were deposited in the past with the Río Tinto. Likewise, the moon Europa contains an acidic ocean of water underneath its ice surface, thus the Río Tinto river is of interest to astrobiologists studying the environmental limits of life and planetary habitability.

== See also ==
- Environmental effects of mining
- List of rivers of Spain
- List of most-polluted rivers
- Tourist Mining Train
