= Maxam Explosives =

Explosives manufacturer

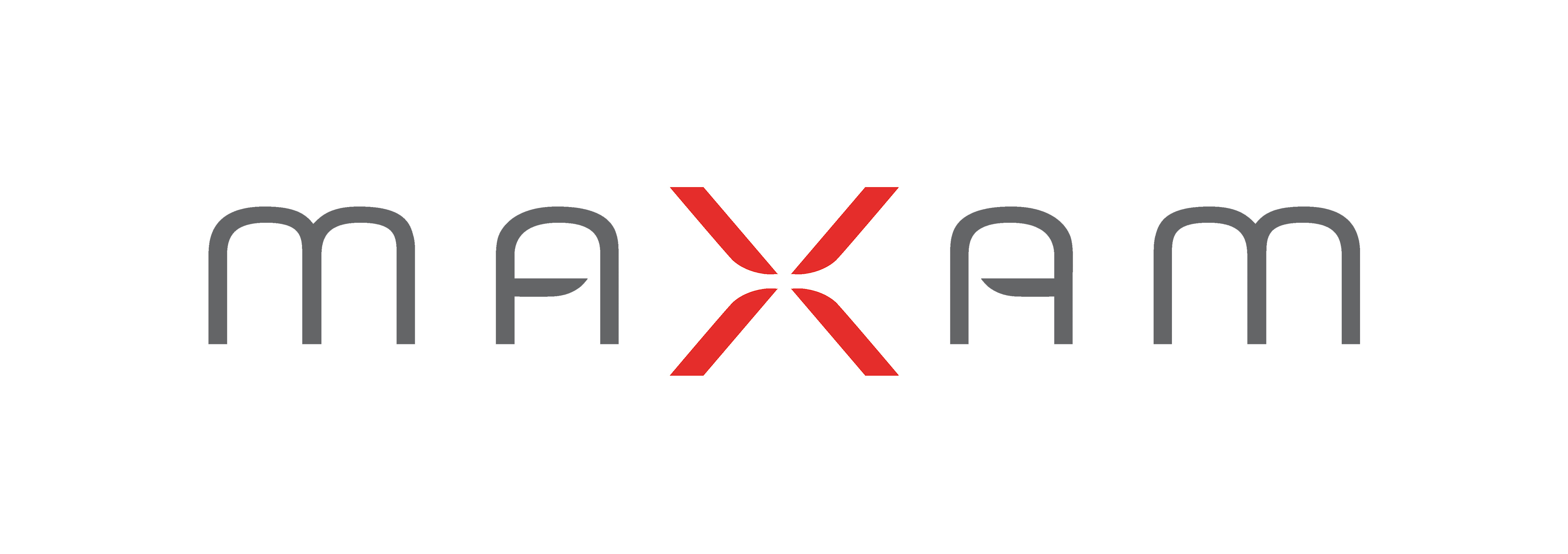
- Headquarters: Madrid
- Website: www.maxamcorp.com

Maxam Explosives is one of the largest explosives manufacturers in the world, with its headquarters in Madrid. In Germany, the plants of the former WASAG belong to Maxam.

The company traces its roots back to the Sociedad Española de la Pólvora Dinamita, founded by Alfred Nobel, which changed its name to Unión Española de Explosivos (UEE) in 1896. In 1970, UEE merged with Río Tinto, creating Unión Explosivos Río Tinto (ERT). ERT was privatised in 1994 and renamed itself Maxam in 2006.

In 2018 Advent International sold its 45% interest in the share capital of MAXAM to Rhône Capital. The remaining 55% is still held by MAXAM's shareholder group.
