= Cerro Colorado mining deposit =

Spanish mining deposit

Coordinates: 37.704°N 6.584°W

Cerro Colorado
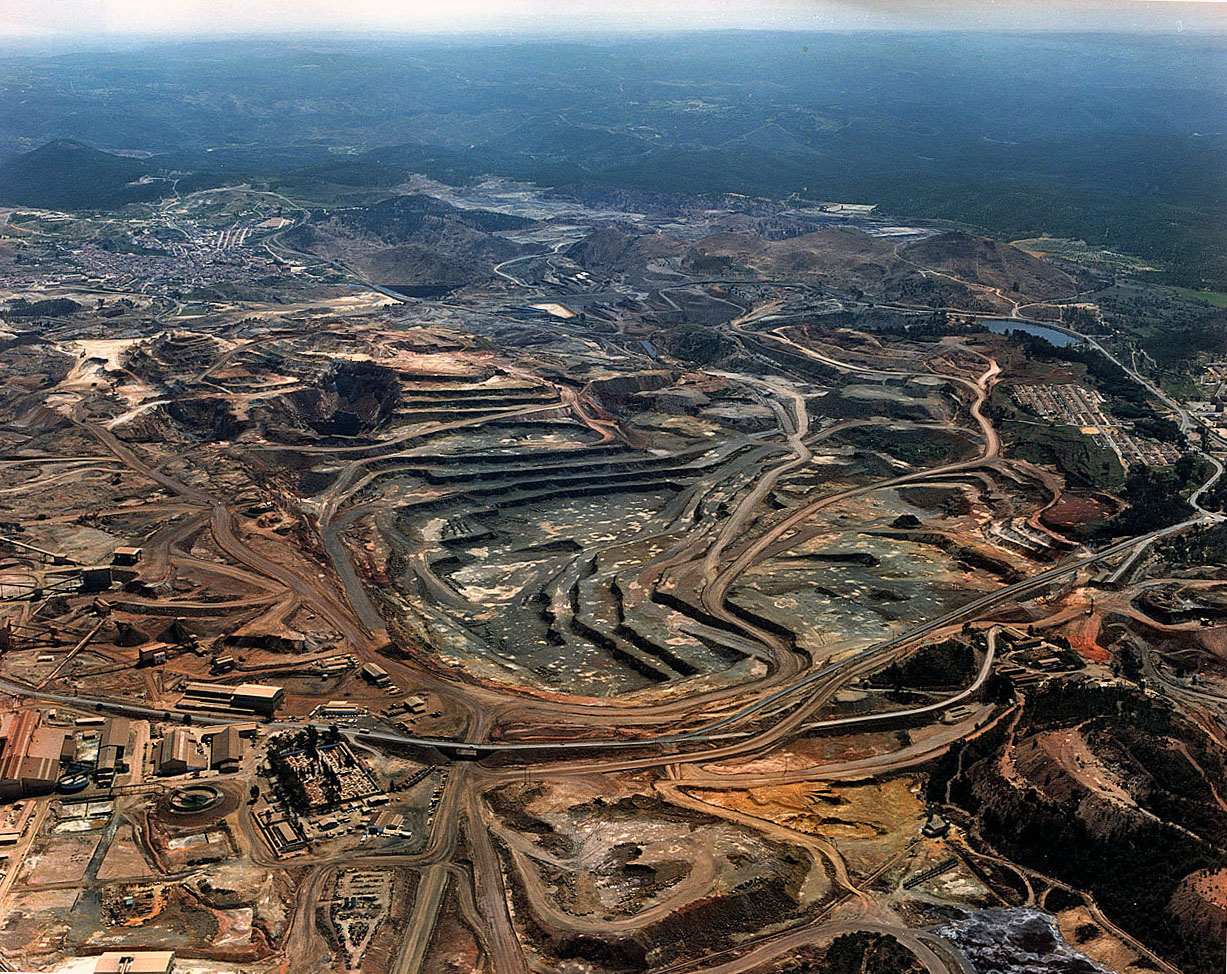
- Aerial view of the Cerro Colorado complex.
- Interactive map of Cerro Colorado
- Location: Minas de Riotinto, Huelva, Spain
- Production: 197 Mt of ore 822 Kt of copper
- Type: Surface mining
- Greatest depth: 230 m
- Opened: 1967
- Active: 1967 - 2001; 2016 - presente
- Closed: 2032 or later
- Company: RTP (1967-1978); RTM (1978-1995); MRT (1995-2001); CYP Atalaya Mining plc

Cerro Colorado, popularly known as Minas del Rey Salomón, is a Spanish mining deposit in the province of Huelva, Andalusia, located in the municipalities of Minas de Riotinto and Nerva. Its main mineral reserve is copper with 822,000 proven tonnes, of which 696,500 tonnes are recoverable with the current market and profitability range of the mine. As of 24 June 2021, with 206,297 tonnes already mined, the copper mineral reserve increased to 702,000 proven tonnes. In addition to some 9.4 million ounces of silver.

The Cerro Colorado deposit began to be exploited in the late 1960s, after the Riotinto mines had been taken over by Spanish capitalists. It soon became one of the main centres of mining activity in the basin, with the construction of several industrial facilities for the treatment of materials. The extraction work continued until its closure in 2001, due to the low economic profitability of its exploitation. However, since 2015 the deposit has been operational again.

== Characteristics ==
=== General description ===
Cerro Colorado is one of the open-pit mines that make up the Minas de Riotinto mining complex, in addition to the Corta Atalaya. It is located within the Iberian Pyrite Belt, in the province of Huelva, about 74 km from Huelva, 65 km from Seville and 500 km from Madrid. Cerro Colorado is one of the largest open pit mines in Europe and has been one of the largest massive sulphide deposits in the world with 500 million tonnes of ore, more than 250 million of which are still unexploited.

=== Dimensions and morphology ===
The Cerro Colorado deposit currently covers an area of 4.2 km^{2}, has a maximum length of 2020 metres, a width of 850 metres and reaches 230 metres at its deepest point. Cerro Colorado is a complex, irregularly shaped mine, which is divided into three cuts composed of up to four concentrations of massive sulphides: Corta Filón Norte (also known as Cerro Colorado Oeste), Corta Filón Sur, Cerro Salomón and Quebrantahuesos (Corta Cerro Colorado Este). In addition to the latter, to the east are two concentrations called Planes and San Antonio, which Atalaya Mining is studying for exploitation. Another large independent adjacent concentration to the west is Masa San Dionisio, which is the unmined part of Corta Atalaya. In total they host some 71 million sulphides (0.77 million tonnes of copper and 1.18 million tonnes of zinc).

=== Resources and reserves ===
In 2016, the Cerro Colorado deposit had a total of 258 million tonnes of ore and 1.02 million tonnes of copper.

Resources	Ore (Mt)	Copper (Kt)	Reserves	Ores (Mt)	Copper (Kt)
Measured	152	593	Proven	128	~525
Indicated	106	424	Probable	69	~304
Total	258	1017	Total	197	822
Inferred	18	90			

== History ==
=== Original exploitation ===
The Compañía Española de Minas de Río Tinto took control of the Rio Tinto mining basin in 1954. Within this area there was an unexploited deposit, Cerro Colorado, whose mass consisted of low-grade copper ores and was covered by a gossan overburden. This ferruginous overburden contained significant amounts of gold and silver, while the stockwork mineralisation had a high copper content. In 1966, the Rio Tinto Patiño company was formed to explore and mine Cerro Colorado, with the first work commencing in 1967. From 1968 onwards, a significant part of the basin's mining and mineralogical activities were concentrated at Cerro Colorado, in contrast to the decline of other deposits.

In 1978 the management of the mines was taken over by Río Tinto Minera (RTM), a subsidiary of the Explosivos Río Tinto group. Cerro Colorado was, in the early 1980s, one of the main copper mines on the European continent. The mineralurgical process was carried out in an industrial unit that was built in the area to obtain gold and silver through the gossan obtained from Cerro Colorado. Copper and gossan were processed in similar units, albeit separately. The copper concentrate obtained was sent by truck to Huelva. The waste resulting from this operation was condensed in order to recover the water, which in turn was redirected to a nearby dam. Over time, the mineral reserves of the deposit increased with respect to the initial estimates due to the research work carried out in old mines in the area, such as Filón Sur, Quebrantahuesos or Cerro Salomón.

During the 1980s, the mining crisis particularly affected the Riotinto basin, which saw many mines closed. The exception was Cerro Colorado. In 1995 the deposit passed into the hands of the labour corporation Minas de Río Tinto (MRT), which kept it in operation for several years. The cessation of activity was due to the then low price of copper on the international markets, which made its profitability unviable. After several years with losses in the millions of dollars, Cerro Colorado ceased operations in 2001.

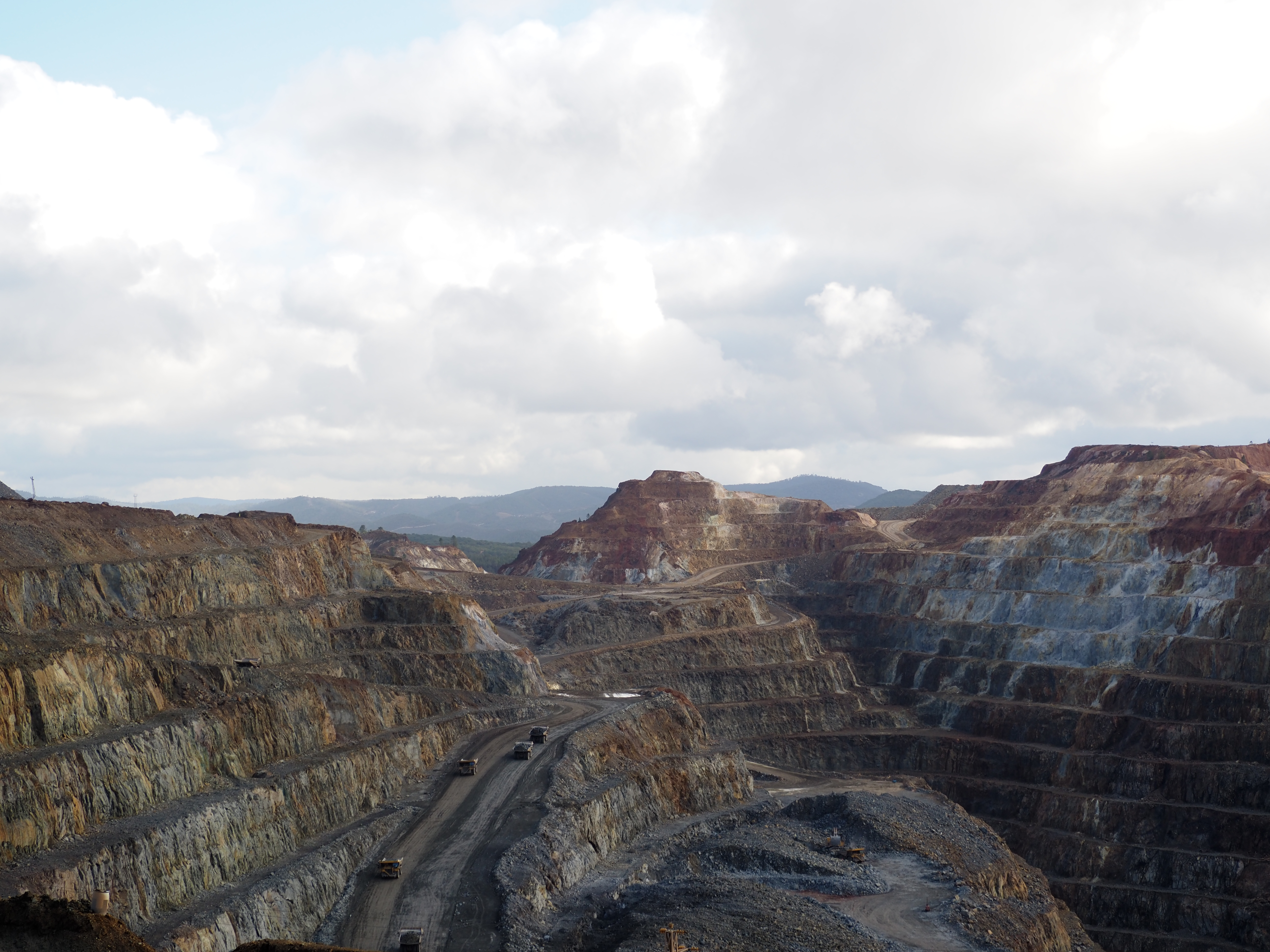
View of Cerro Colorado in full activity, December 2021.

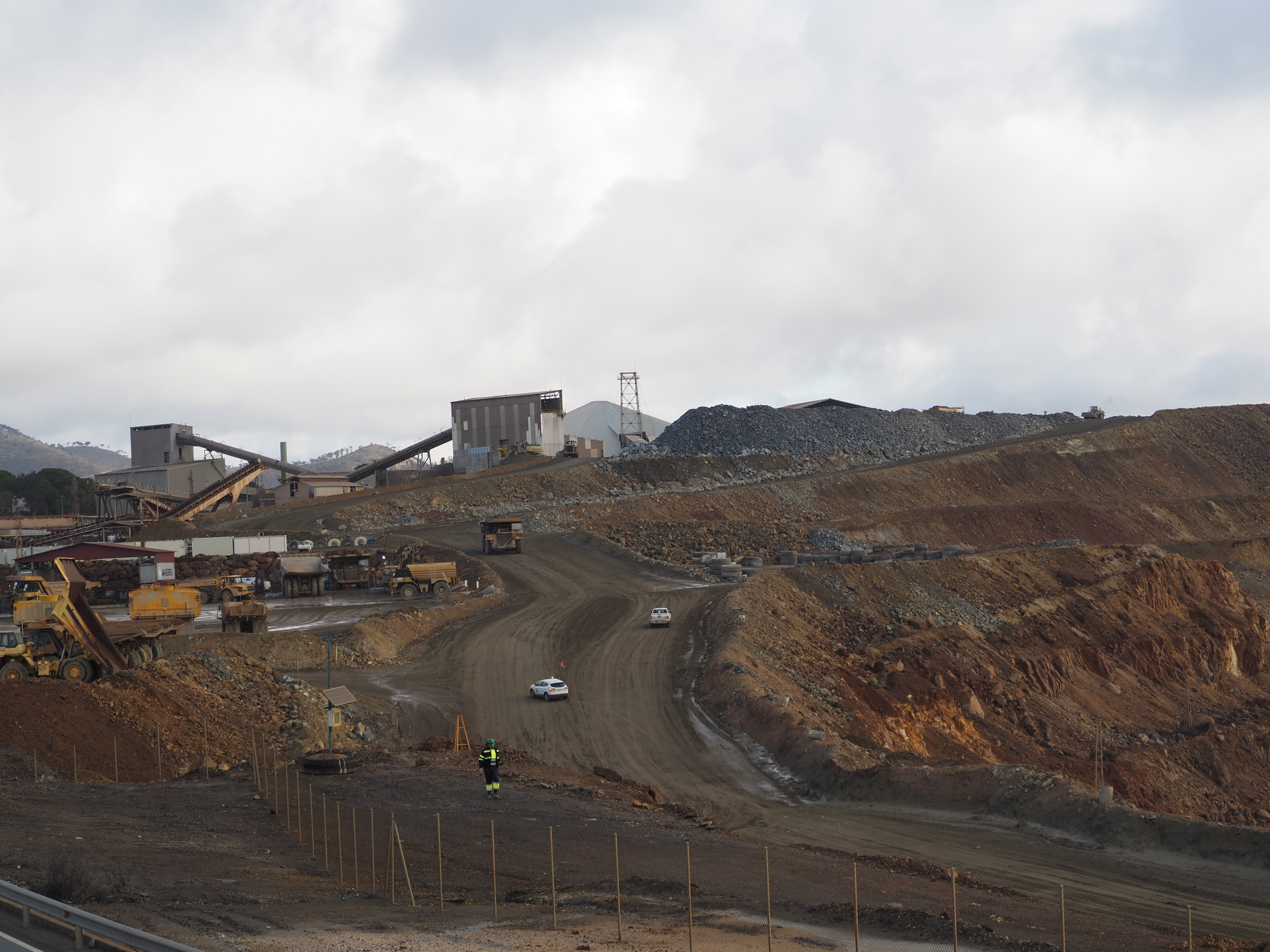
Cerro Colorado vehicles and facilities, December 2021.

=== Current stage ===
The Cerro Colorado complex was virtually abandoned since 2001, with no maintenance work being carried out, and the deposits were flooded. This situation continued for years. At that time, there were several attempts to restart the exploitation, but none of them were successful.

It was not until 2007, due to rising metal prices, that EMED Mining (now known as Atalaya Mining plc) planned to reopen and exploit the site. In 2015, the company was granted a mining permit, and in 2016 it began commercial production and sale of its copper concentrates. The project originally had a 14-year life with reserves of 606,000 tonnes. However, the reserves were subsequently increased to 702,000 tonnes and the project life increased to 16.5 years (13.8 years with the expansion to 15 Mtpa). With the current proven and probable reserves, Cerro Colorado will be 2400 m long, 1250 m wide and have a maximum depth of 335 m when it reaches the end of its life.

== Recent production ==
In the first phase, throughout 2016, the plant had the capacity to treat between 5 and 7.5 million tonnes of ore per year (37,500 tonnes of concentrate). At the end of that year, phase 2 of maximum production was established, some 45,000 tonnes of concentrate to follow during the first three years of operation (2016–2019). From 2020, production is set at 15 million tonnes of ore and 55,000 tonnes of concentrate.

Year	Ore (Mt)	Copper (t)
2016	6,5	26.179
2017	8,8	37.164
2018	9,8	42.114
2019	10,5	44.950
2020	14,8	55.890
2021	15,8	56.139
2022	14,9	52.269
2023	14,9	51.667
Total	96,3	366.372

== Mining equipment ==
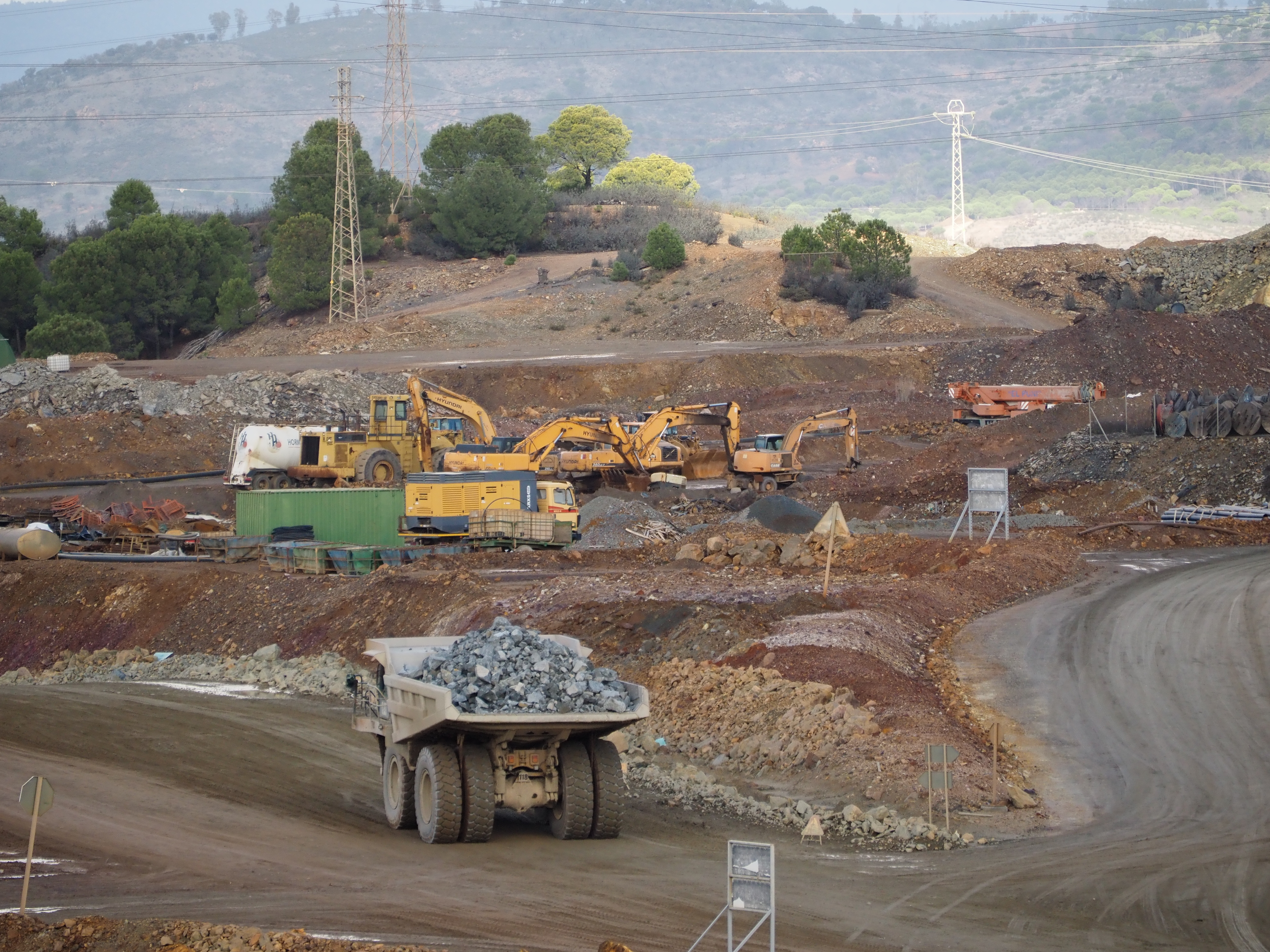
Dumpers and backhoes at Cerro Colorado, December 2021.

The mining stripping equipment consists of the following:

- A total of 53 dump trucks: 4 Komatsu HD605, 10 Komatsu HD465, 40 Komatsu HD785. In addition there is an unspecified number of CAT 777s.
- A total of 15 excavators: 2 Komatsu PC1250, 6 Komatsu PC2000, 1 Hitachi EX1900, 1 Hitachi EX1200, 1 Hitachi ZX890, 3 CAT 6015B and 1 CAT 345b.
- A total of 13 drills: 8 Sandvik Pantera DP1500i, 2 Sandvik Pantera DP1100i, 2 Atlas Copco C50 and Atlas Copco C45.
- One CAT 993K wheel loader.

== See also ==
- Riotinto-Nerva mining basin

== Bibliography ==
- Arenas Posadas, Carlos (2017). "Riotinto, el declive de un mito minero (1954-2003)". Revista de Historia Industrial (in Spanish) (69). Barcelona: Universidad de Barcelona: 109–142. ISSN 1132-7200.
- Delgado, Aquilino; Rivera, Timoteo; Pérez-Macías, Juan Aurelio; Regalado, M.ª de la Cinta (2013). "La catalogación del patrimonio minero industrial de la cuenca minera de Riotinto mediante la aplicación del Sistema de Información Geográfico (SIG)". De Re Metallica (in Spanish) (20). Madrid: Sociedad Española para la Defensa del Patrimonio Geológico y Minero: 83–95. ISSN 1888-8615.
- Vázquez Guzmán, Fernando (1983). Depósitos minerales de España (in Spanish). Madrid: Instituto Geológico y Minero de España.
