= Fernando Carmona =

Fernando Carmona may refer to:

- Fernando Ocaranza Carmona (1876–1965), Mexican surgeon
- Fernando Briones Carmona (1905–1988), Spanish painter
- Fernando Carmona (American football) (born 2002), American football player
