= Compañía Española de Minas de Río Tinto =

Former mining company of Spain

- Abbreviation: CEMRT
- Formation: October 28, 1954
- Dissolved: 1970
- Type: S.A.
- Headquarters: Madrid; Minas de Riotinto
- Location: Spain

Compañía Española de Minas de Río Tinto (CEMRT) was a Spanish company that operated between 1954 and 1970, mainly in the province of Huelva. Dedicated to mining activities in the Rio Tinto-Nerva basin, over the years the company diversified its business into other sectors. After consolidating its position, in 1970 it merged with another company, giving rise to the Unión Explosivos Río Tinto (ERT) group.

== History ==
=== Origins and creation ===
Since 1873, the Rio Tinto mines had been under the control of a British-owned company, the Rio Tinto Company Limited (RTC), under whose management they had experienced a great mining and industrial boom. However, from the end of the 1920s, RTC's business declined due to the economic situation of the time, especially after the crash of 1929 and the subsequent arrival of the Second Republic. Some managers began to look to the mines in Africa, especially Rhodesia, which offered much more favourable prospects. After the Civil War, the company's situation in Spain was very complex, due to the hostility of Franco's authorities, the difficulties arising from the Second World War and the plummeting profits. Faced with this situation, the Riotinto mines were considered to be separated from the RTC business. Between 1945 and 1947 there were reunions with the Cros company, but these were not fruitful.

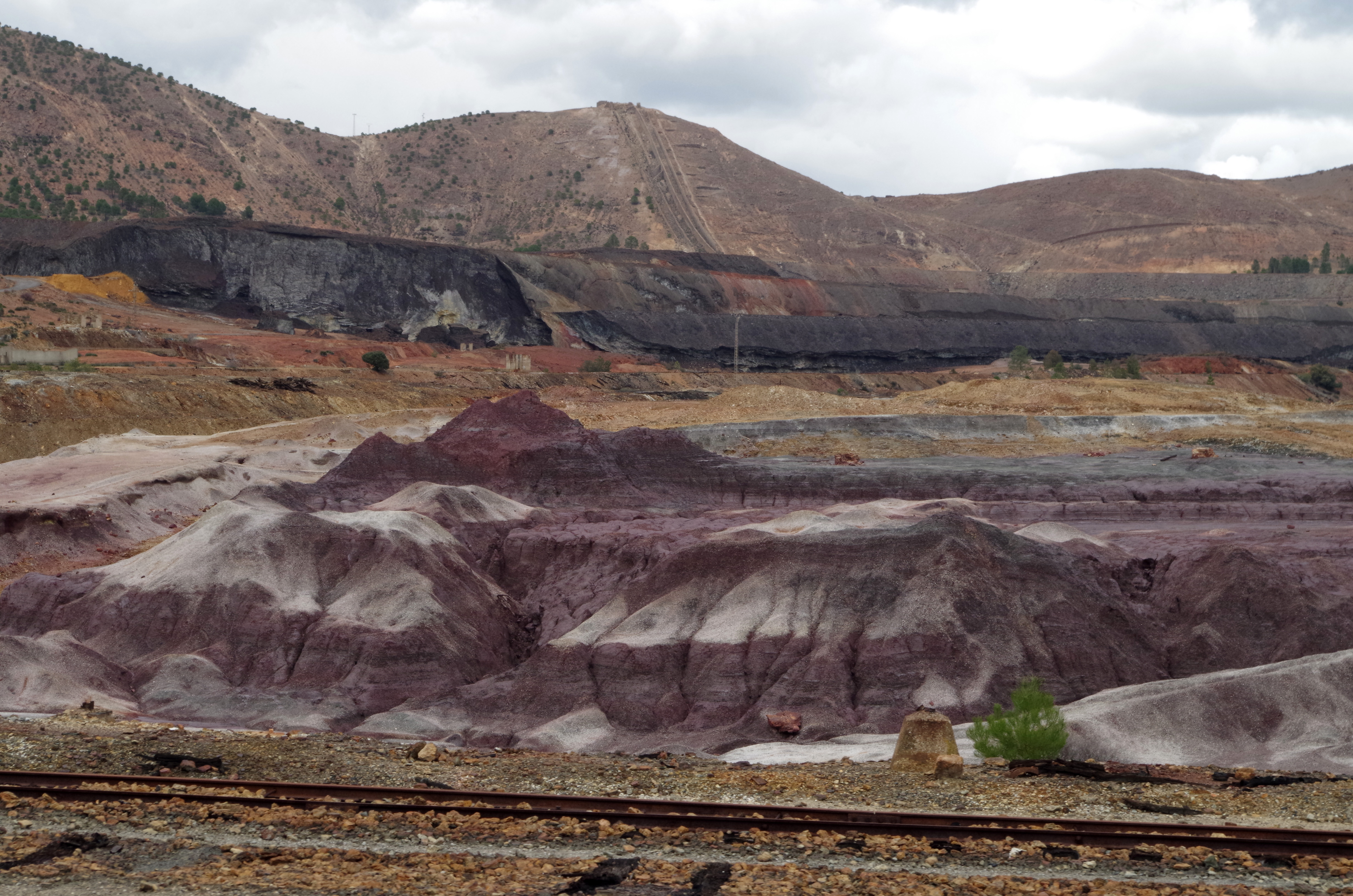
Riotinto mining landscape, in the vicinity of the Naya area.

In June 1954, the Rio Tinto Company Limited began negotiations that would lead to the sale of its assets in Spain in exchange for £7.6 million of pounds and a stake in the new company. Banco Español de Crédito, Banco Hispano Americano and Banco de España were involved in the purchase. (Note: Other financial institutions would also end up participating in the operation: Banco Exterior de España, Banco Central, Banco de Vizcaya, Banco de Bilbao and Banco Urquijo.) Franco's government approved the acquisition shortly afterwards, on 14 August, for which a new company was set up. The acquisition became highly symbolic at the time. For more than eighty years, British control of the Rio Tinto mines had been seen by many as a symbol of the weakness of Spanish capitalism, so the "Spanishisation" of the mines by CEMRT was a symbol reflecting the new situation. For the Rio Tinto Company it also had important consequences, as it would mean further diversification of its business in other parts of the world.

The Compañía Española de Minas de Río Tinto was officially incorporated on 28 October 1954, with its registered office in Madrid. The businessman Joaquín Benjumea was appointed chairman of the Board of Directors of CEMRT, while General Antonio Torres Espinosa was appointed General Manager.

=== Expansion phase ===
The new company took over the management of the deposits on 1 January 1955. CEMRT came to control all the installations in Huelva, the railway line, the pier, the country estates and the mining concessions held by RTC throughout Spain. However, the British maintained their presence in Huelva through their technical consultancy services and by developing the commercial activities carried out by CEMRT abroad. After a period of business consolidation, which included a reduction in the workforce, modernisation of machinery and improved productivity, from 1962 onwards the company implemented an expansion strategy that included an industrialisation plan in the Huelva area. In the Riotinto mining basin it had already started the construction of new facilities, such as an ore crushing plant located in the Zarandas-Naya area or a sulfuric acid plant located near Nerva. From 1964 onwards, the company played an important role in the development of the Chemical Park of Huelva, where it installed an electrolytic plant to obtain pure copper.

Although historically Riotinto's ores had been destined for international export, under CEMRT they began to be destined for domestic consumption. During the period between 1954 and 1971, the company was the second largest seller of pyrites in Spain after Compañía de Azufre y Cobre de Tharsis Limitada, with 38.5% of the market share. By then, a large number of mining operations in the province of Huelva had been closed down, so Riotinto was one of the main ones still in operation. Among the company's most important customers were companies such as Cros, Sefanitro, Repesa, Empresa Nacional Calvo Sotelo, Energía e Industrias Aragonesas, Industrial Química de Zaragoza, Abonos Sevilla, etc. CEMRT was also closely linked to the Sociedad Española de Construcciones Electromecánicas, in Córdoba, to which it supplied copper.

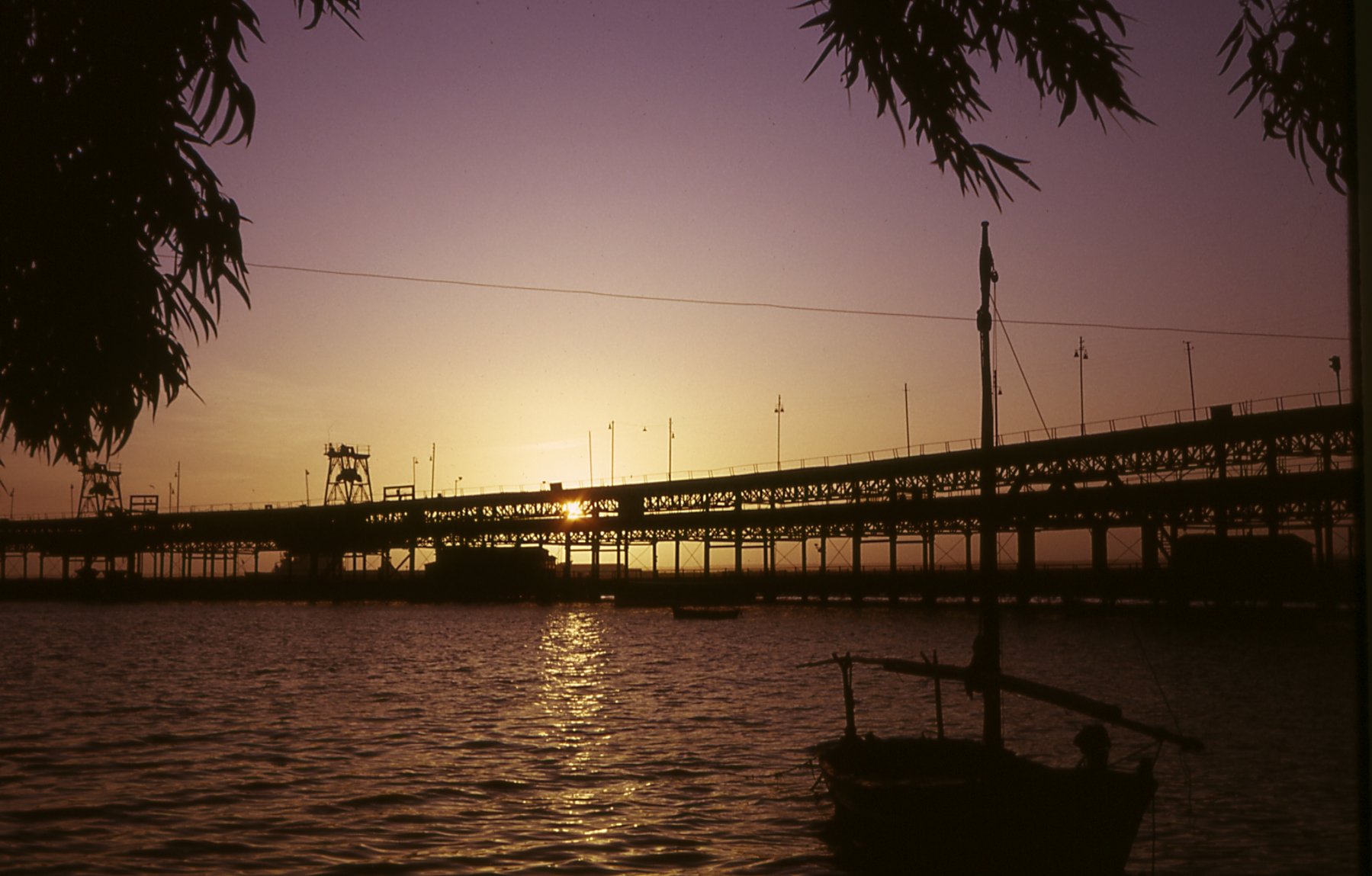
View of the Riotinto pier in Huelva in 1969.

From 1963, under the presidency of Javier Benjumea Puigcerver, CEMRT embarked on a more expansive strategy, taking advantage of both a favourable economic situation and a privileged situation of aid and tax exemptions from the Franco regime. In line with the company's diversification policy, from 1964 onwards it held talks with foreign copper suppliers in order to meet its new chemical-industrial activities. In 1966, the company Rio Tinto Patiño (RTP) was founded by CEMRT, Rio Tinto-Zinc (RTZ) and the Patiño group. Under the agreement, while RTZ and Patiño undertook to supply copper, CEMRT ceded to RTP the exploitation of the copper porphyry deposits at Cerro Colorado.

CEMRT was also behind the construction of the La Rábida petrochemical complex, inaugurated in 1967, which was built in collaboration with Gulf Oil.

The company maintained its pyrite mining activity in the Riotinto basin, seeking new national customers for this mineral. As a result of this strategy, in 1970, CEMRT merged with Unión Española de Explosivos and became Unión Explosivos Río Tinto.

== Archive collections ==
At present, the company's documentary collections are in the custody of the Historical Mining Archive of the Río Tinto Foundation.

== Bibliography ==
- Arenas Posadas, Carlos (2017). "Riotinto, el declive de un mito minero (1954-2003)". Revista de Historia Industrial (in Spanish) (69). Barcelona: Universidad de Barcelona: 109–142. ISSN 1132-7200.
- Calderón, M.C. (2017). "Archivos mineros históricos adheridos al sistema andaluz de archivos. El archivo minero de la fundación Río Tinto: Archivo Histórico Minero de la Fundación Río Tinto AHFRT y Sociedad Francesa de Piritas de Huelva". Patrimonio geológico y minero: Una apuesta por el desarrollo local sostenible (in Spanish). Emilio Romero Macías (dir.). Universidad de Huelva: 459–476.
- Ferrero Blanco, María Dolores (2000). Un modelo de minería contemporánea: Huelva, del colonialismo a la mundialización (in Spanish). Universidad de Huelva.
- Flores Caballero, Manuel (2017). La nacionalización de las minas de Río Tinto y la formación de la compañía española (in Spanish). Huelva: Servicio de publicaciones de la Universidad de Huelva. ISBN 9788493768744.
- Fourneau, Francis (1983). La provincia de Huelva y los problemas del desarrollo regional (in Spanish). Diputación de Huelva/Instituto de Estudios Onubenses «Padre Marchena».
- Gil Varón, L. (1996). "Renacimiento, esplendor y crisis: Rio Tinto, 1725-1990". Actas del II Congreso de Historia de Andalucía-Andalucía Contemporánea (in Spanish). Córdoba: Caja de Ahorros de Córdoba. pp. 223–240.
- Gómez Mendoza, Antonio (2016). "La españolización de las minas de Riotinto". Río Tinto. Historia, patrimonio minero y turismo cultural (in Spanish). Huelva: Universidad de Huelva/ Fundación Río Tinto.
- Harvey, Charles E. (1981). The Rio Tinto Company. An economic history of a leading international mining 1873-1954 (in Spanish). Alison Hodge.
- Romero Macías, Emilio M. (2006). Los Ferrocarriles en la provincia de Huelva: Un recorrido por el pasado (in Spanish). Universidad de Huelva. ISBN 978-84-16061-73-0.
- Ruiz Ballesteros, Esteban (1998). Minería y poder: antropología política en Riotinto (in Spanish). Diputación provincial de Huelva.
- Tamames, Ramón (1992). Estructura Económica de España (in Spanish). Alianza Editorial.
