= Corta Atalaya =

Open-pit mine in Andalusia, Spain

Coordinates: 37°42′12″N 6°36′10″W

Corta Atalaya is an open-pit copper mine in the city limits of Minas de Riotinto in the province of Huelva, autonomous community of Andalusia, Spain. It was actively mined until 1992. It is now owned by Atalaya Mining, formerly EMED Mining, through its 100%-owned subsidiary, EMED Tartessus SL.

== History ==
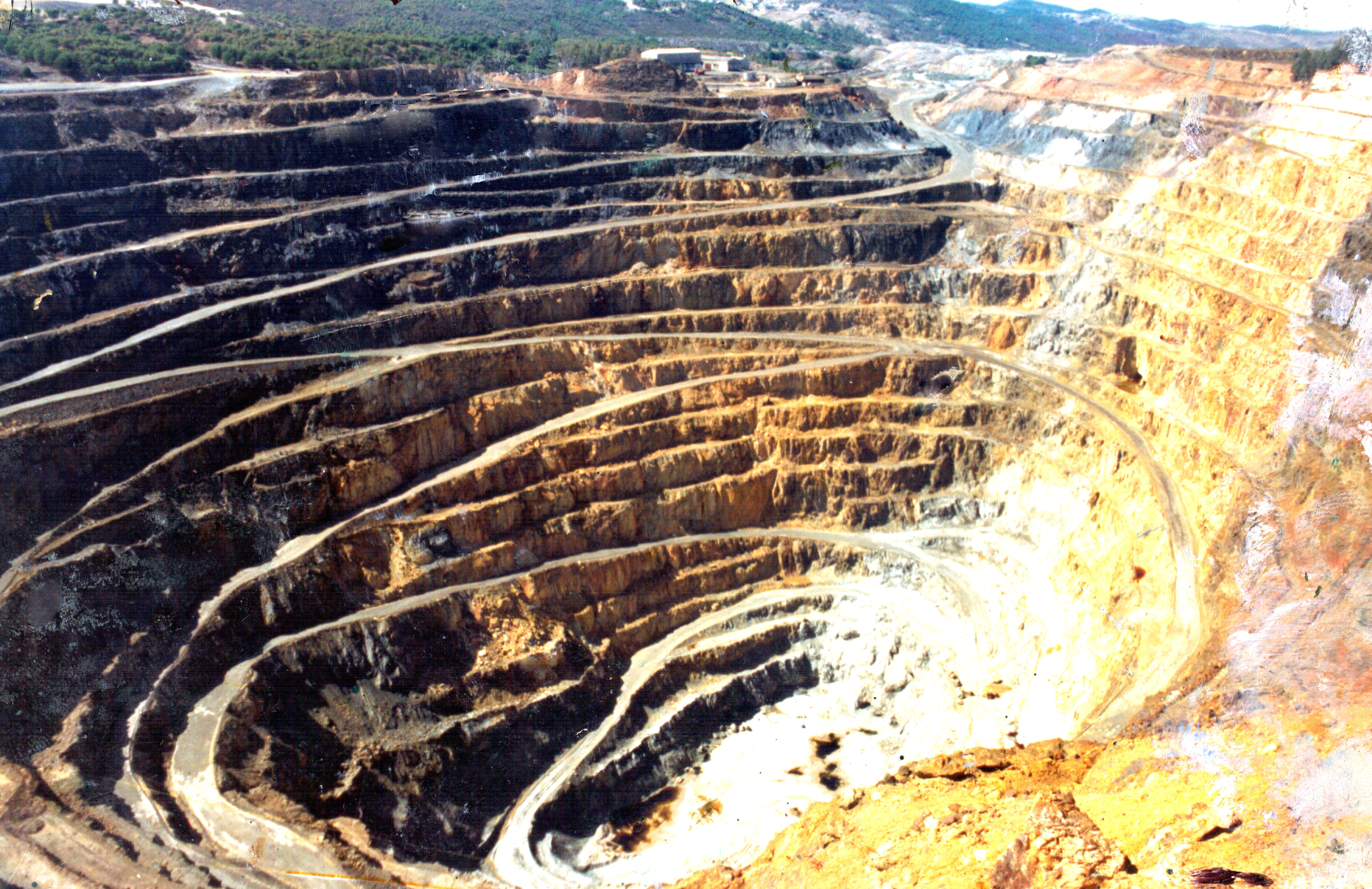
Corta Atalaya the 1980s, before closure and inundation.

In 1873, Rio Tinto Company, later Rio Tinto Group, acquired the mines of Riotinto. This open-pit mine in the western part of the Masa San Dionisio was begun in 1907 after major subsidence in some of the higher-altitude parts of the area two years earlier. At its peak the mine employed 2,000 workers mining copper. It was nationalized in 1954 and closed in 1992.

Atalaya Mining, formerly EMED Mining, acquired 100% of the mine, through its 100%-owned subsidiary, EMED Tartessus SL, in October 2008. Although mining activity has not re-commenced at Corta Atalaya, the company re-started commercial production of copper further east at Cerro Colorado in February 2016.

Two films have used the former mine as a locale: El corazón de la tierra, directed by Antonio Cuadri and based on the novel of the same name by Juan Cobos Wilkins, a political-historical film about the Rio Tinto mines; and the science fiction film Proxima, written and directed by Carlos Atanes, which used the mine as an otherworldly landscape.

== Geology ==
Corta Atalaya is a mine in western part of the Iberian Pyrite Belt. It is part of a zone of volcanogenic massive sulfide ore deposits of Silurian to Carboniferous age which has produced significant copper, zinc, lead, gold and silver. It is roughly elliptical in shape, 1,200 metres (3,900 ft) long, 900 metres (3,000 ft) wide, and 350 metres (1,150 ft) deep. Since at least 1994 it has been flooded up to the 16th ring.

== The village of La Atalaya ==
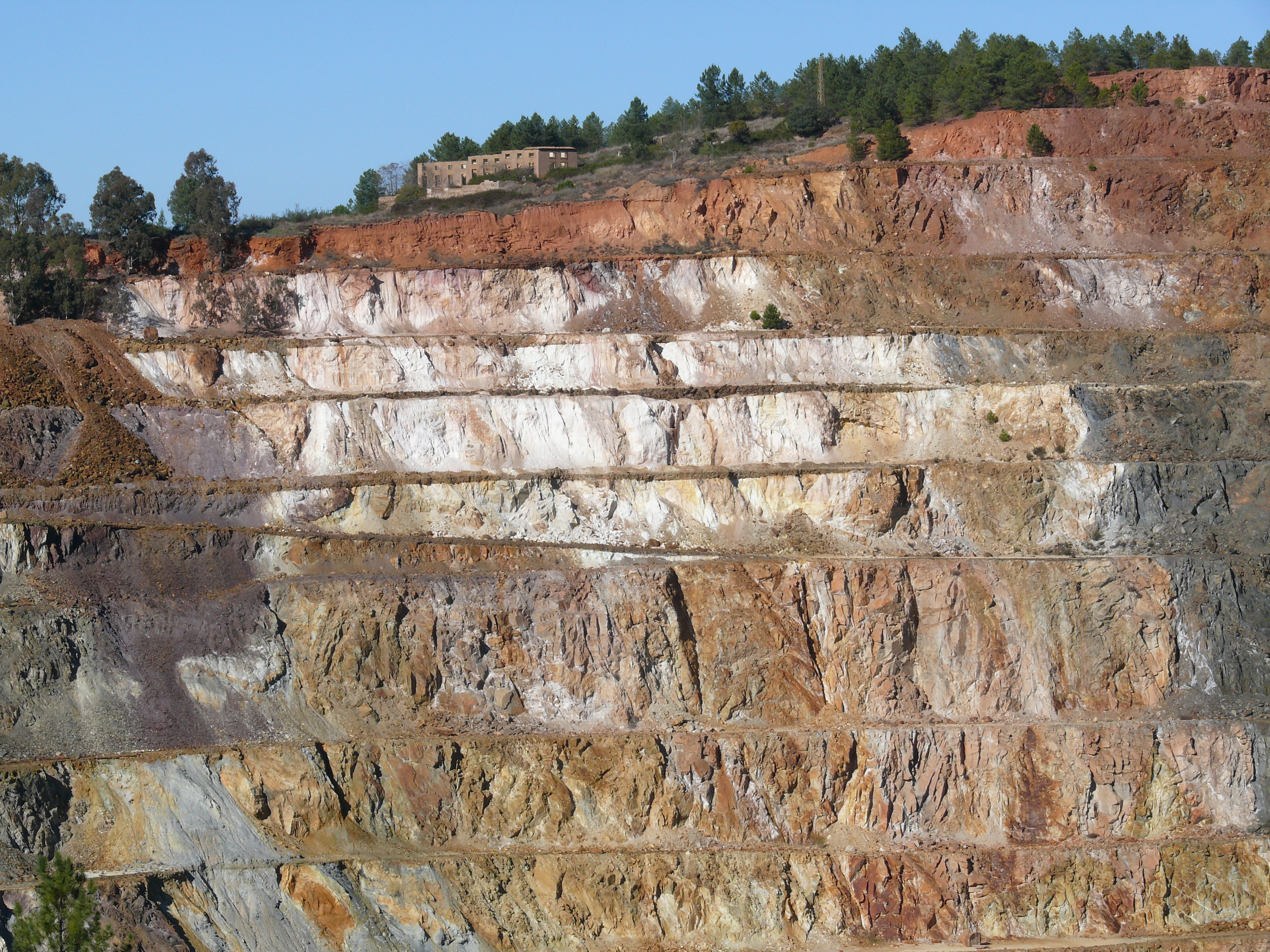
Remnants of the former village of Atalaya on the edge of the cut.

The village of La Atalaya was founded in 1883.

Year	1888	1900	1910	1920	1930	1940	1950	1970
Population of La Atalaya	823	1,272	1,472	1,105	1,238	1,009	662	823

In 1970, La Atalaya had 257 buildings and a population of 823. That year, approval was received to enlarge the pit; in 1971, La Atalaya was destroyed because it was in the path of the mining. La Atalaya was not the only townsite sacrificed to the mine. Earlier, the original location of Minas de Riotinto lay in the path of the mine; the town was moved to its present site.

The nearby golf course Club de Golf Atalaya has grass only on its putting greens. Originally the North Lode Golf Club, founded in 1890, it was Spain's oldest, but was abandoned to the growth of the Corta Atalaya pit. It reopened in 1992 under its current name and configuration.

== Gallery ==
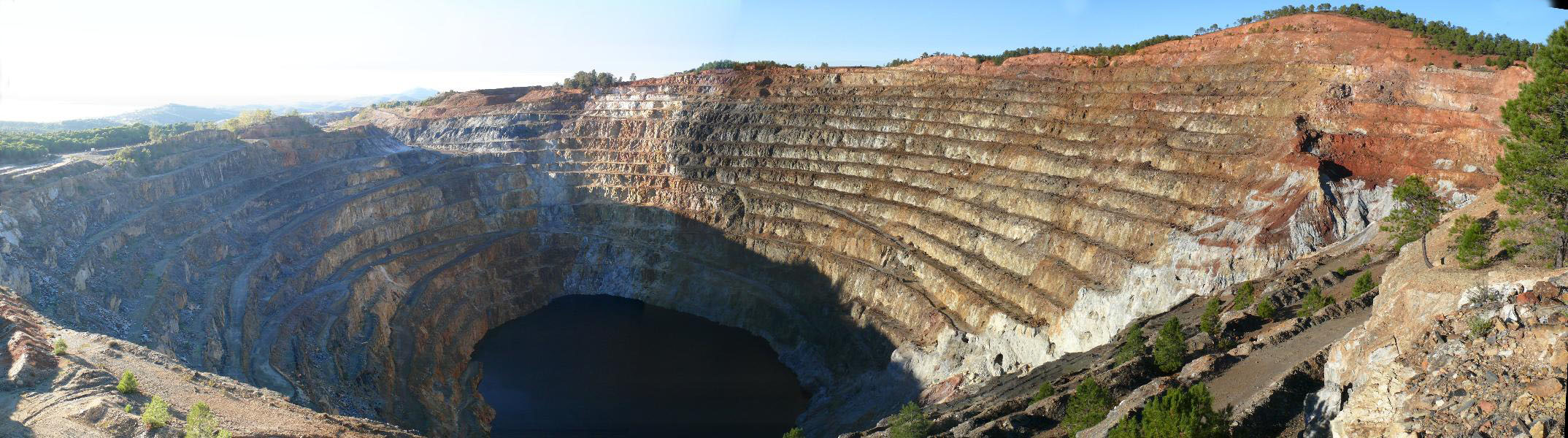
Panorama of Corta Atalaya.

The following images help to give a sense of the scale of the mine.

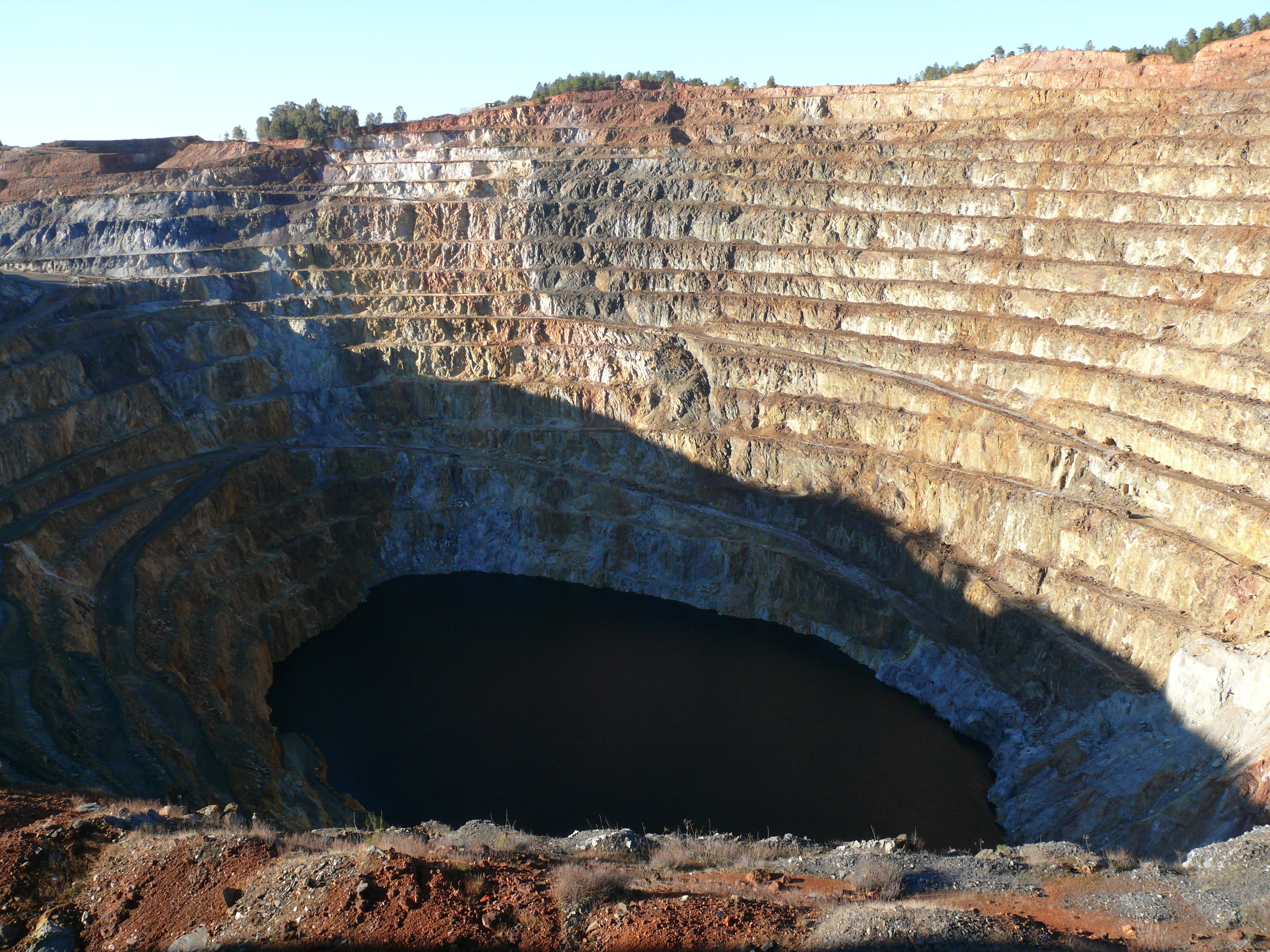
Near the right of this image, in the fourth ring from the bottom, you can see an object.

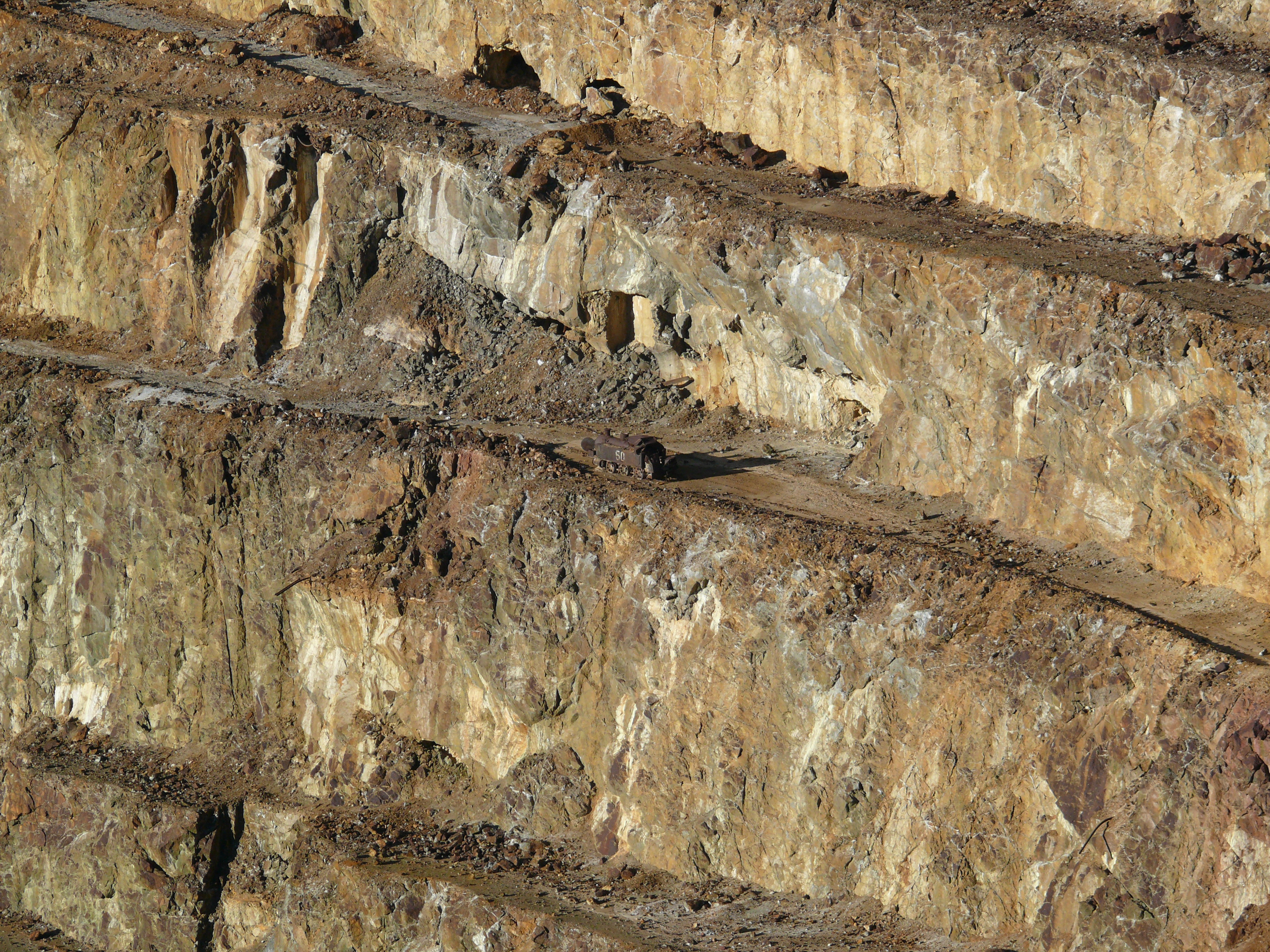
Here, we zoom in, so the object can be made out a bit more easily.

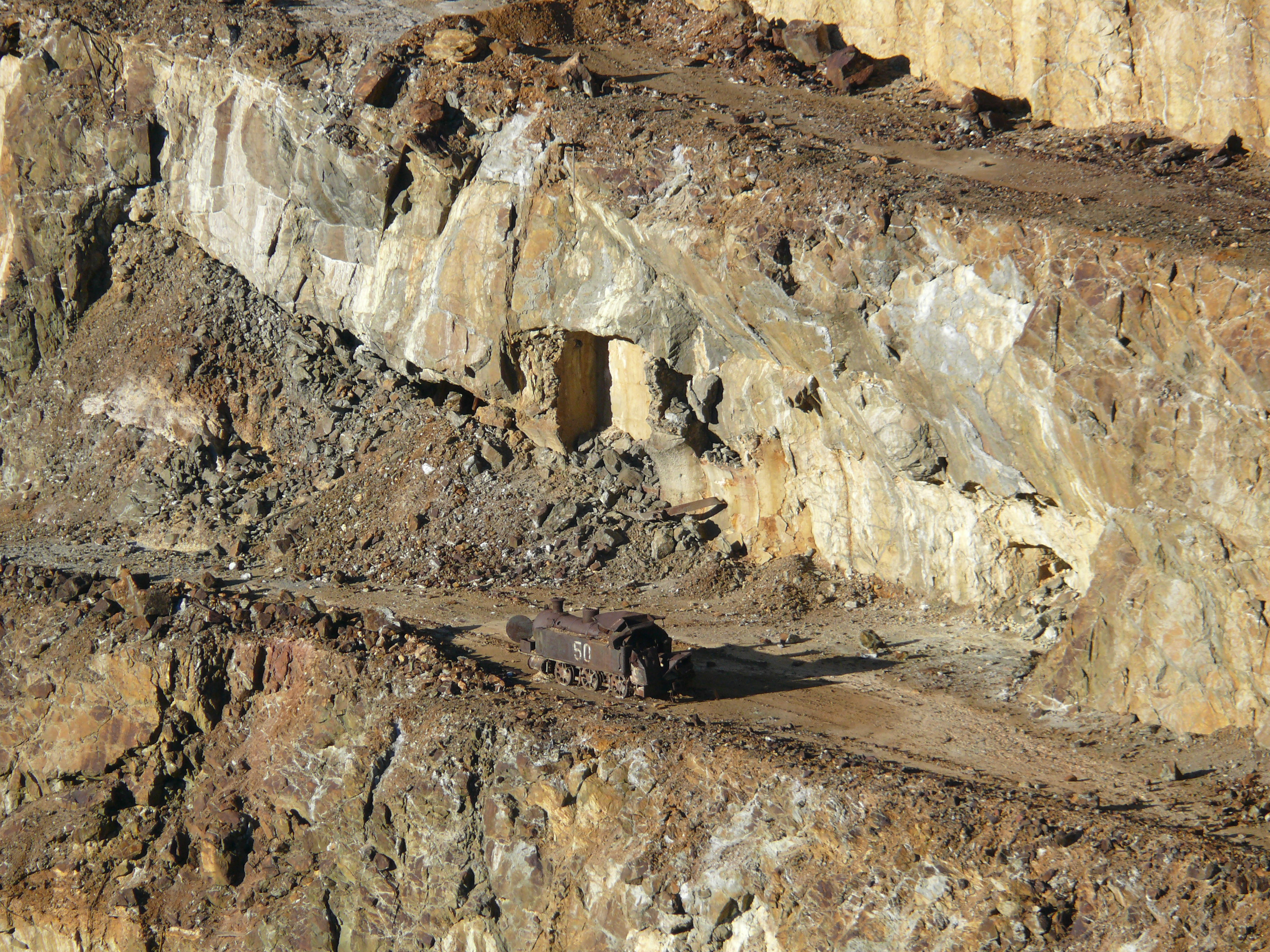
Zooming in further, one can see that the object is an abandoned steam locomotive. (Click through for a larger image.)
