= Fernando Briones Carmona =

Spanish painter (1905–1988)

Fernando Briones Carmona (April 30, 1905 – July 28, 1988) was a Spanish painter. He was born in Écija and died in Madrid, where he spent most of his life.

== Childhood and early years ==
At the age of 14, he moved to the capital to enter the Real Academia de Bellas Artes de San Fernando. He prepared his accession exams drawing and copying sculptures in the Museo Nacional de Reproducciones Artísticas. At fifteen, he succeeded to enter the Academy and enrolled in oil painting, encaustic, tempera, etching, watercolour and sculpture. He completed the five years in the Academy and then remained two more years, developing teaching activities, to finally achieve a master's degree.

== Artistic education ==
His teachers in the Academy included Cecilio Plá and José Benedito (painting), José Moreno Carbonero and Julio Romero de Torres (drawing) and Francisco Esteve Botey (etching). Between 1924 and 1927, he was awarded with a fellowship from the Fundación Molina Higueras and also twice obtained a scholarship to join the Artist's Summer Residence in el Paular (Madrid). His work, presented in a common exhibition with other resident artists, was accredited with a diploma with honours. He also obtained two residence scholarships to visit during the summer the Artist's Residence of the Alhambra (Granada). At the closing exhibition hosted by the residence, he met Federico García Lorca, Manuel de Falla and Daniel Vázquez Díaz, who highly praised his paintings. In 1930, the Junta para la Ampliación de Estudios e Investigaciones Científicas awarded him a scholarship to visit Paris and its drawing academy. In 1932, he participated for the first time in the Exposición Nacional (National Exhibition) and was awarded the Bronze Medal for his work "Portrait". In the same year, he presented a colour aquatint at the International Exhibition of Venice. In 1933, he obtained a position as a drawing teacher in a high school in Elche, but he resigned after only one year and returned to Madrid. In 1934, he won the Silver Medal in the Exposición Nacional for his picture "Chinese mannequin", painted in the Museo Arqueológico de Madrid. In 1935, he was appointed head of studies in the Escuela de Artes Aplicadas y Oficios Artísticos de Madrid, in the graphic design section.

== The Spanish Civil War years ==
During the Spanish Civil War, he joined the teachers' union FETE-UGT and the Alianza de Intelectuales Antifascistas (Alliance of Antifascist Intellectuals) which included among its leading figures the poet Rafael Alberti. During this period, graphic artists contributed to the war effort producing signs, notices and placards for the Republican Army. As public servants enlisted in the popular militias, he joined the Quinto regimiento (Fifth Regiment). He was a comrade of great poets, such as the forgotten and much admired by him Antonio Aparicio (later forced into exile) and Miguel Hernández. During these years, he carried out an intense artistic activity. In 1937, he participated in the Paris International Exposition with a painting featuring the shooting of Federico García Lorca. This canvas, later displayed in the Centro de Arte Reina Sofía in an exhibition commemorating the Spanish pavilion of the International Exposition, was hosted by the Museo de Arte Moderno of Barcelona. In 1943, the Real Academia de San Fernando awarded him the Conde de Cartagena fellowship.

== Plenitude ==
In 1946, his work "Portrait" received the First medal in the Salón de Otoño (Madrid). The following year, he was awarded the Second prize in the National Painting Contest and, in 1948, he won the First prize with his work "Bathers". In 1950, he obtained a faculty position as art lecturer on drawing in the Escuela de Artes Aplicadas y Oficios Artísticos de Madrid and was awarded the first prize in the national competition organised by the Unión Española de Explosivos for his painting "The Sorcerer". That year, commissioned by the Unión Española de Explosivos, he painted the rock salt mines of Cardona (Barcelona). In 1951, his painting "Sleeping Dancer", later purchased for a private collection in Mexico, received the second prize in a public vote organised during the Primera Bienal Hispanoamericana de Arte (Madrid). In 1952, he was awarded the second medal for etching in the Exposición Nacional de Bellas Artes (National Exhibition of Fine Arts). In 1954, he received a scholarship to develop pedagogic studies about drawing in France and Italy. In 1955, he received the first prize in the Fine Arts Exhibition of Linares (Jaén). In 1958, he participated in a competition to design the tapestry cartoons intended for the Valley of the Fallen National Monument, in Cuelgamuros (Madrid), obtaining the first prize. In 1962, he was appointed director of the Escuela 7ª de Artes y Oficios Artísticos de Madrid.

He worked in his artist's studio in the Madrilenian street of Hortaleza, where he took full advantage of the particular light and orientation of his penthouse, which became a sort of magic box that produced his still lifes and figures, all painted from life.

In 1942, he married in Llanes (Oviedo) his wife Isabel Fernández-Pola, a member of a family of Llanes intellectuals. Many of his works are nowadays hosted in different private collections. In 1968, the cessation of the National Exhibitions and the Salones de Otoño and his bad relationship with art critics, especially embittered after the publication of his article "I, a Spanish painter" – which included a ferocious criticism of contemporary pictorial movements – drove him to withdraw from all public exhibitions and motivated his refusal to sell any painting in Spain. In fact, most of his production was thereafter sold in the United States. Nonetheless, he continued painting assiduously until his last days. In 1975, he retired from the Artes y Oficios Artísticos de Madrid. A street named Pintor Fernando Briones was dedicated to him in his birthplace, Écija (Sevilla).

== Individual exhibitions ==
- 1943 – Salón Cano.
- 1945 – Sala Vilches.
- 1946 – Salón Cano.
- 1949 – Salón Dardo.
- 1949 – University of Oviedo.
- 1952 – Salón Dardo.
- 1955 – Salón Dardo.
- 1957 – Sala Vilches.
- 1962 – Salón Cano. A No-Do (news and documentaries newsreel) featuring his work was filmed in his studio.

== Collective exhibitions ==
- 1924 – Palacio de Biblioteca y Museos, Fellows of the Residence of el Paular (Madrid).
- 1925 – Salón de Exposiciones del Museo de Arte Moderno, "Landscape and Figures by the Fellows of the Residence of el Paular and Asturias".
- 1927 – Ateneo de Granada, "Landscape’s Exhibition by the Fellows of the Residence of la Alhambra (Granada)".
- 1932 – Exposición Nacional, bronze medal.
- 1933 – Círculo de Bellas Artes, exhibition of paintings and sculptures.
- 1934 – Exposición Nacional, "Chinese mannequin" and "Women brushing their hair", silver medal.
- 1942 – Salón de Otoño, "Flora".
- 1943 – Sala Vilches, New modern painters.
- 1944 – Salón de Otoño, "Country girls".
- 1945 – Exposición Nacional, "Melancholic Pierrot". Museo Nacional de Arte Moderno, Vases and Still lifes by the Association of Painters and Sculptors, "Children portraits".
- 1946 – Sala Macarrón, Collective Exhibition by the Association of Painters and Sculptors, "Women portraits". Salón Cano, Artists Exhibition.
- 1947 – Sala Kebos, Paintings and Drawings by the Association of Painters and Sculptors, "Composition with figures". Sala Greco, bullfighting scenes, National Contest, second prize (encaustic).
- 1948 – Ministerio de Agricultura, Mural painting National Contest, first prize.
- 1949 – Círculo de Bellas Artes, Annual Grand Prix Exhibition, National Exhibition, "Painter", "Dancer" and "The Truth".
- 1950 – Unión Española de Explosivos Grand Contest. First prize in the National Exhibition, "Fernandito and Maribel" and "The Musician Angel".
- 1951 – Morocco and Colonies, Paintings of Africa, Bienal Hispanoamericana de Arte, Madrid.
- 1952 – Association of Spanish engravers, Goya and the Spanish etching in America. Sala Los Sótanos, three painters.
