= George Barclay Bruce =

British civil engineer

- Born: 1 October 1821; Newcastle upon Tyne, Tyne and Wear
- Died: 25 August 1908 (aged 86); St. John's Wood, London
- Education: Percy Street Academy
- Spouse: Helen Norah Simpson
- Children: One son and four daughters
- Engineering career
- Discipline: Civil
- Institutions: Institution of Civil Engineers (president), Institution of Mechanical Engineers (member)
- Projects: Royal Border Bridge
- Awards: French Legion d'honneur (officer)

Sir George Barclay Bruce (1 October 1821 – 25 August 1908) was a British civil engineer. He was primarily a railway engineer who worked for many railway companies in Britain, Europe, Asia and South America. He was closely involved with the Institution of Civil Engineers, serving at various times as a member, council member, vice-president and president. He received a knighthood from the British Government and was made an officer of France's Legion of Honour in recognition of his services to construction. Bruce was a Presbyterian and committed himself to spreading the church in England and to improving public education, to which end he gave his time and money generously.

== Early life and career ==
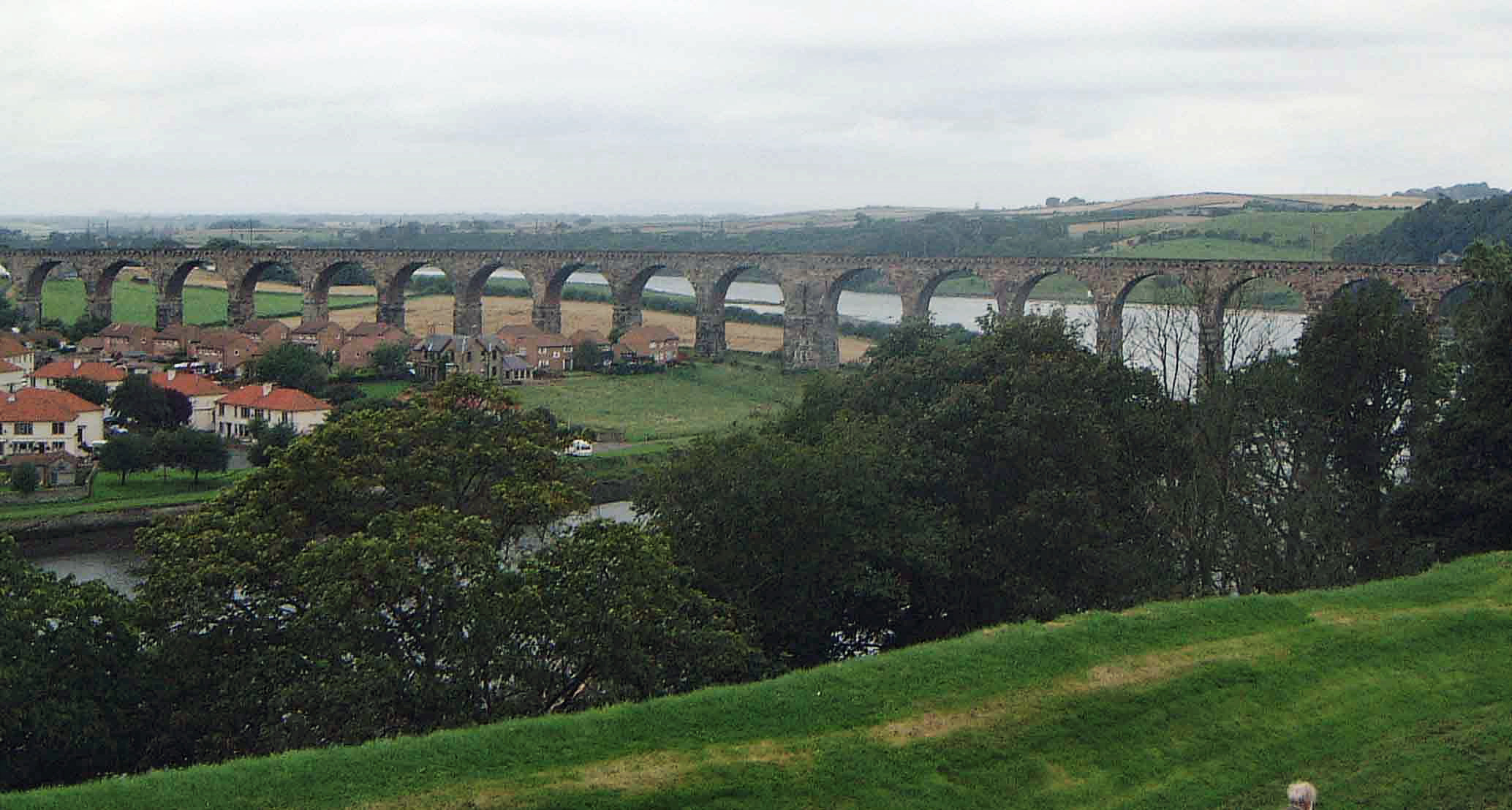
Royal Border Bridge

Bruce was born in Newcastle upon Tyne to John Bruce, the founder of Percy Street Academy. Amongst his father's pupils at the academy was Robert Stephenson, the railway engineer, to whom George was apprenticed for five years from 1836. He then spent two years working on the construction of the Newcastle and Darlington Railway, followed by two years as resident engineer on the Northampton and Peterborough line. Stephenson then appointed him to work on the Royal Border Bridge, after it opened in 1850. Bruce presented an account of his time there to the Institution of Civil Engineers, for which he received a Telford Medal in 1851. Following this, Bruce was primarily concerned with the construction and maintenance of railways in India. He was engaged by the East Indian Railway and the Madras Railway until ill health ended his time in India in 1856.

== Consultancy ==
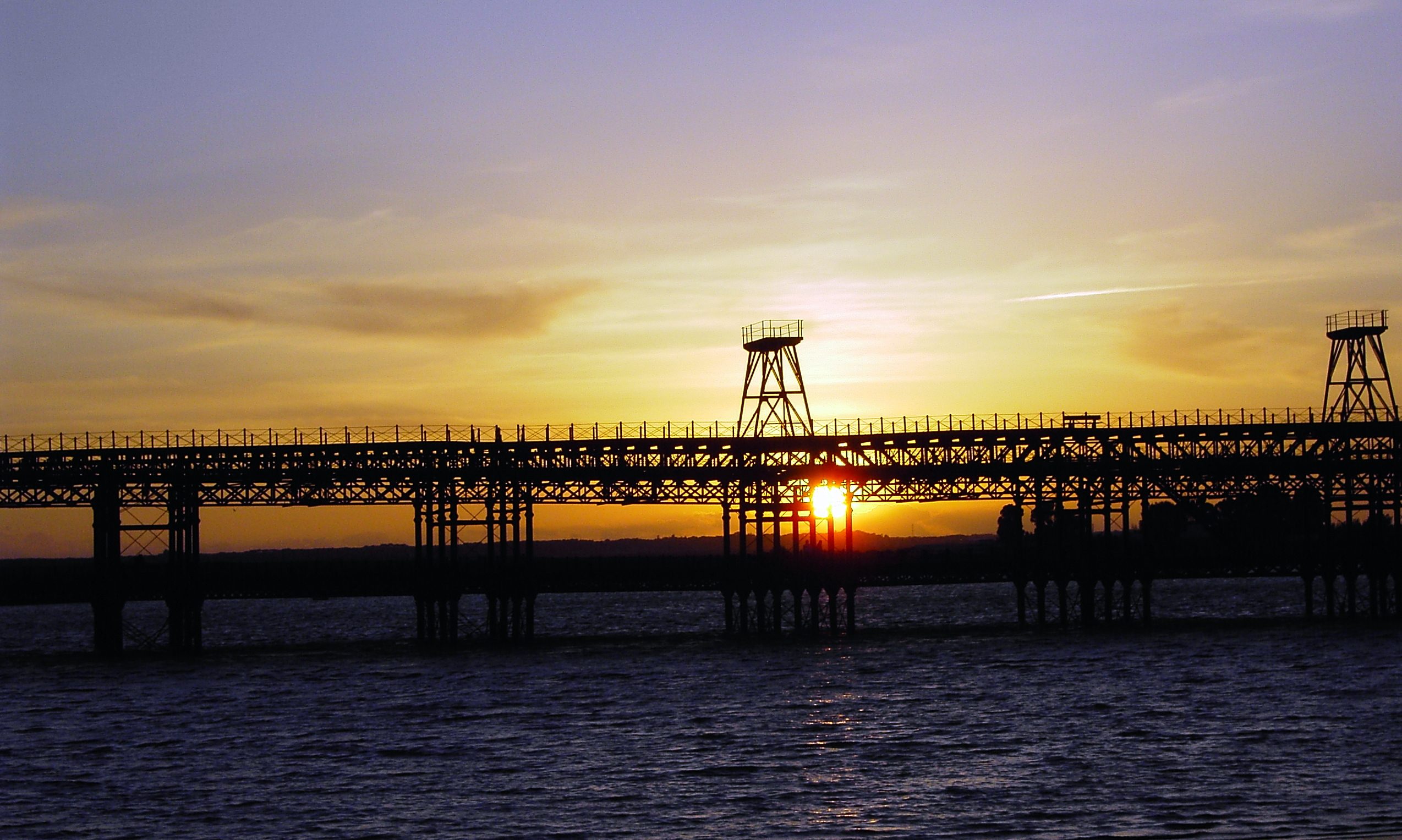
"Muelle del Tinto", Huelva, Spain

Upon his return to England, Bruce established a consulting engineering practice in Westminster, in 1888 taking Robert White as a partner. Developing a considerable worldwide reputation for railway construction, many of his works were undertaken abroad. In particular, he continued his close relationship with the Indian railways, acting as a consultant to the South Indian Railway, Great Indian Peninsula Railway and Indian Midland Railway. He also worked on several lines in present-day Germany and Russia, amongst them the Tilsit-Insterburg (Kaliningrad Oblast) and Berlin-Görlitz lines (Brandenburg and Saxony). Between 1873 and 1876 Bruce constructed a railway and pier at Huelva in Spain to aid the shipping of ore from the Rio Tinto copper mines for the newly formed Rio Tinto Group. Other works abroad included the East Argentine Railway and the Buenos Aires Grand National Tramway in Argentina and the Beira Railway in southern Africa.

Closer to home, Bruce worked with many British railway companies, including works on the Stonehouse and Nailsworth, Kettering, Thrapston and Huntingdon Railway, Whitehaven, Cleator and Egremont and Peterborough, Wisbeach and Sutton railway lines. He was an advocate of the 5 ft 6 in rail gauge, which was popular amongst the British colonies at the time.

== Professional recognition ==
Bruce became a member of the Institution of Civil Engineers in 1850. He was elected a member of their council in 1871, vice president in 1883 and president between June 1887 and May 1889, the golden jubilee year of the institution. In recognition of his services to the profession, he was knighted by Queen Victoria at Windsor Castle on 10 July 1888. In 1889 he was made an officer of the French Legion of Honour. He became a member of the Institution of Mechanical Engineers in 1874. A portrait of him by W. M. Palin was presented to the Institution of Civil Engineers by members in 1889 for their gallery of former presidents.

== Personal life ==
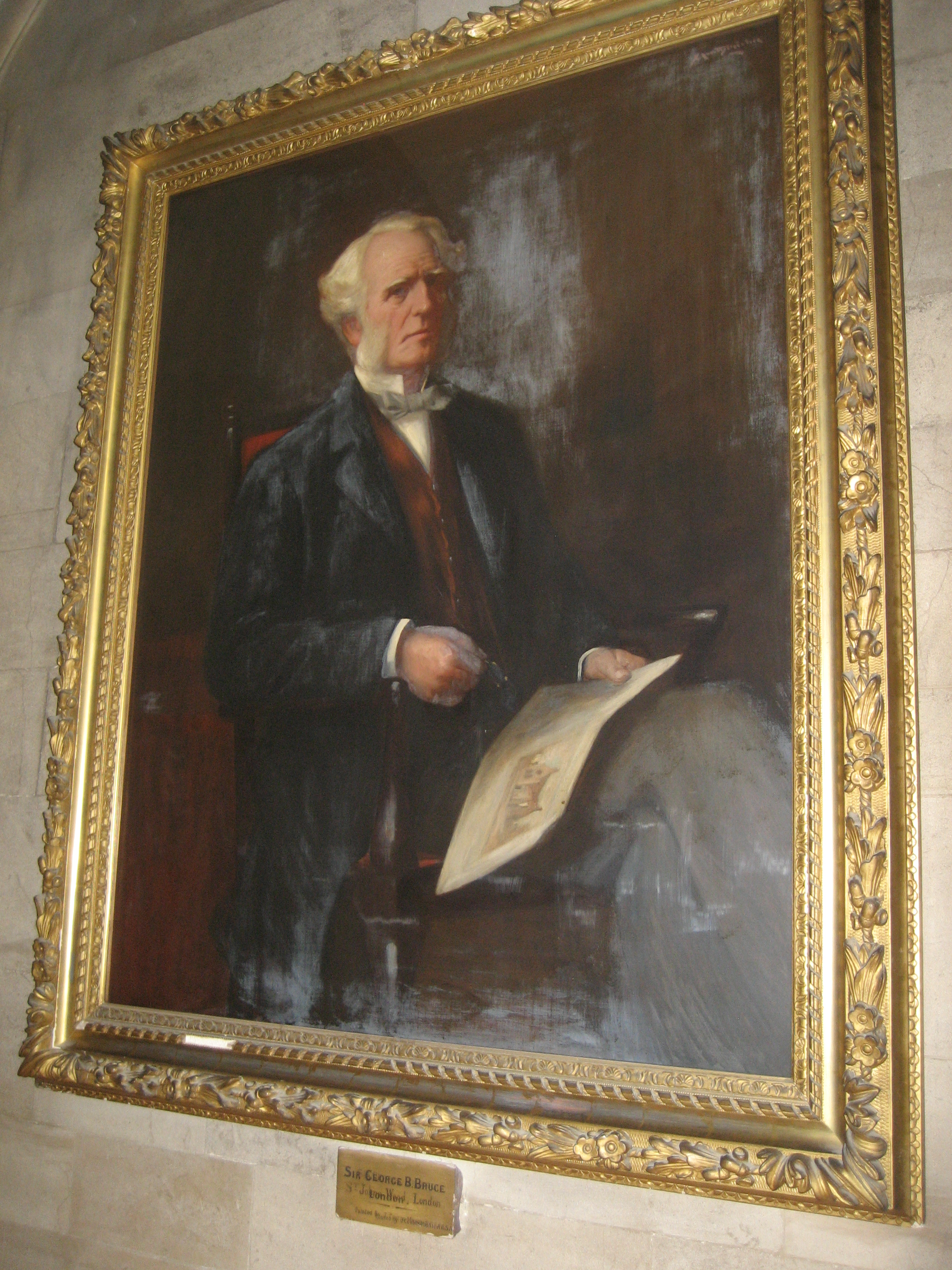
George B. Bruce (Painting by James Coutts Michie in Westminster College, Cambridge)

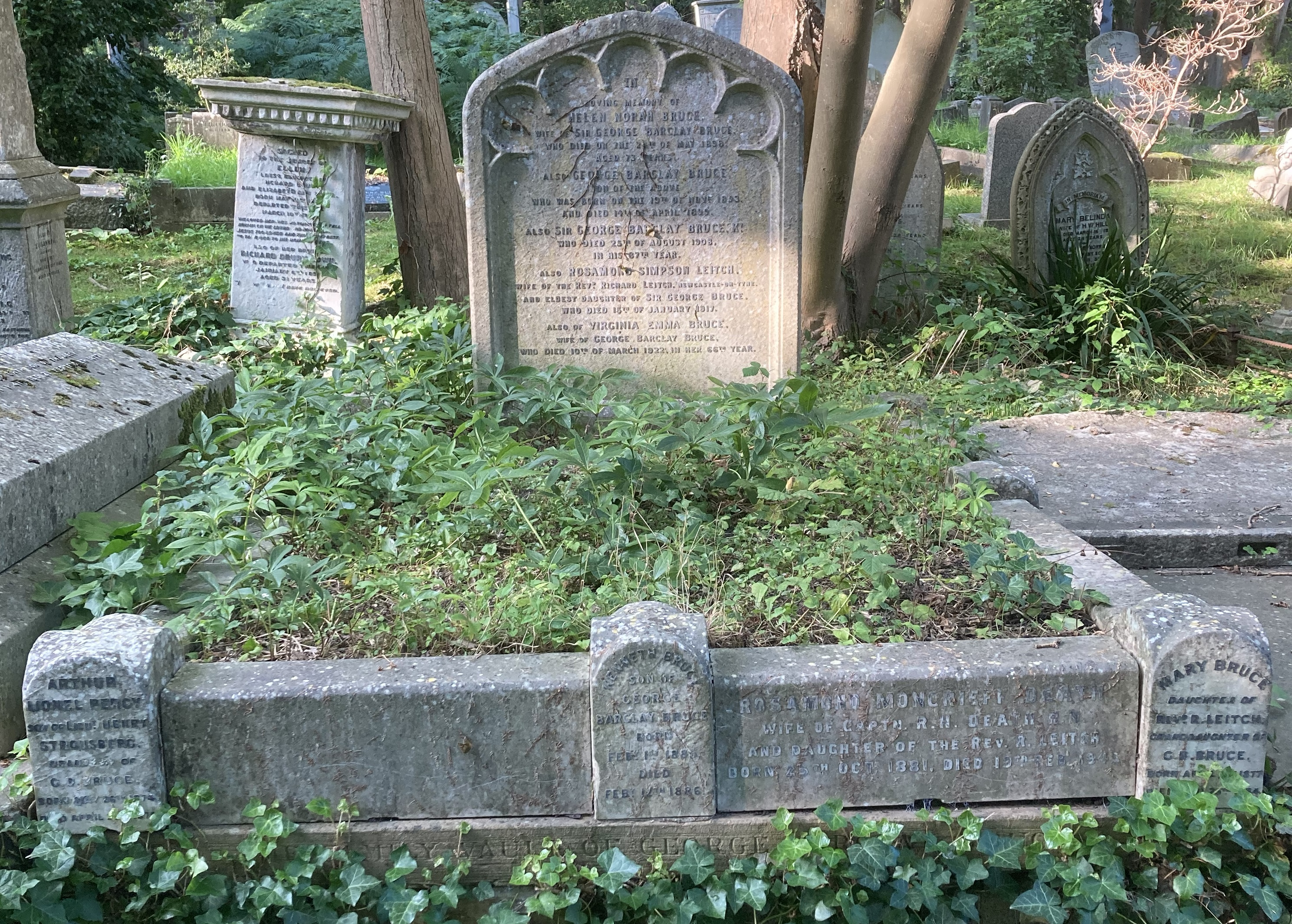
Family vault of George Barclay Bruce in Highgate Cemetery

Bruce was committed to the cause of Presbyterianism in England and to the furtherance of public education. He gave his money and time generously to promote the union of the various Presbyterian churches into a single Presbyterian Church of England, which was created in 1876. He also built a Presbyterian church and manse at Wark on Tyne using his own funds. His efforts to improve public education were largely carried out by representing Marylebone as a member of the School Board for London between 1882 and 1885.

He married Helen Norah Simpson in 1847 by whom he had one son and four daughters. One of his daughters was Margaret Bruce, who married the son of Bethel Henry Strousberg, the German “Railway King”. Bruce died at his home in St John's Wood on 25 August 1908 and was buried in a family vault on the eastern side of Highgate Cemetery, situated almost opposite the grave of Karl Marx.

Professional and academic associations
Preceded by Edward Woods	President of the Institution of Civil Engineers; June 1887 – May 1889	Succeeded by John Coode
