= Unión Española de Explosivos =

Former Spanish explosives and chemical company

- Type: Sociedad anónima
- Industry: Armaments, chemicals
- Founded: March 16, 1896
- Defunct: 1970
- Successor: Maxam
- Headquarters: Bilbao, Madrid, Spain
- Subsidiaries: SED (1896–1948)

The Unión Española de Explosivos (UEE) was a Spanish explosives and chemical company, founded in 1896 and renamed Maxam in 2006.

Originally established to manufacture explosives, the company later diversified into other industries, including the production of cartridges and fertilizers. In 1970, it merged with the Compañía Española de Minas de Río Tinto, forming Unión Explosivos Río Tinto. However, this merger was temporary, and some years later UEE would regain its corporate identity and independent existence. After a long process of reorganization and international expansion, in 2006 it was renamed Maxam.

== History ==
=== Founding and early years ===
The company was born in 1896 from the union of the Sociedad Anónima Española de la Pólvora Dinamítica (originally created in 1872) and seven other dynamite manufacturers, forming the Unión Española de Explosivos. The new company was formally established in Bilbao on March 16, 1896, with the participation of prominent industrialists. (Note: Such as Telesforo de Errazquin y Astigarraga, Paul du Buit, Max Adolph Philipp, Gustavo Aufschlager, José Tartiére Lenegre, Anselmo González del Valle, Luis de Vereterra y Estrado, Alberto Thiebaut y Laurin, José Tarruella y Munner, among others. At the time of its incorporation, the Unión Española de Explosivos had a capital of twenty-five million pesetas of that era.) In 1897 the State granted UEE the legal monopoly for the production and distribution of explosives in Spain for a period of twenty years, until 1917. This gave the company a privileged position in the market, and over time it would become one of the leading Spanish companies. Although UEE initially focused on the manufacture of gunpowder and explosives, it later diversified its business and also engaged in the production of fertilizers (potashes, phosphates...). In 1903 UEE created the Sociedad General de Industria y Comercio (GEINCO), a subsidiary based in Bilbao under which to consolidate all of the company's activities related to the manufacture of chemical products and fertilizers at its facilities in Galdakao, Bilbao-Elorrieta, and La Manjoya (Oviedo).

During the course of the Spanish Civil War (1936–1939) UEE's facilities were divided between the two zones, depending on the success or failure of the coup d'état in each area. The factories were seized by both sides for war production, as occurred, for example, with the factories based in Catalonia, which were seized by the Comisión de Industrias de Guerra. In the case of the factories in Biscay, following the Francoist occupation of the territory, from the second half of 1937 onward UEE's production centers experienced significant growth.

=== From the postwar period to the developmentalist era ===
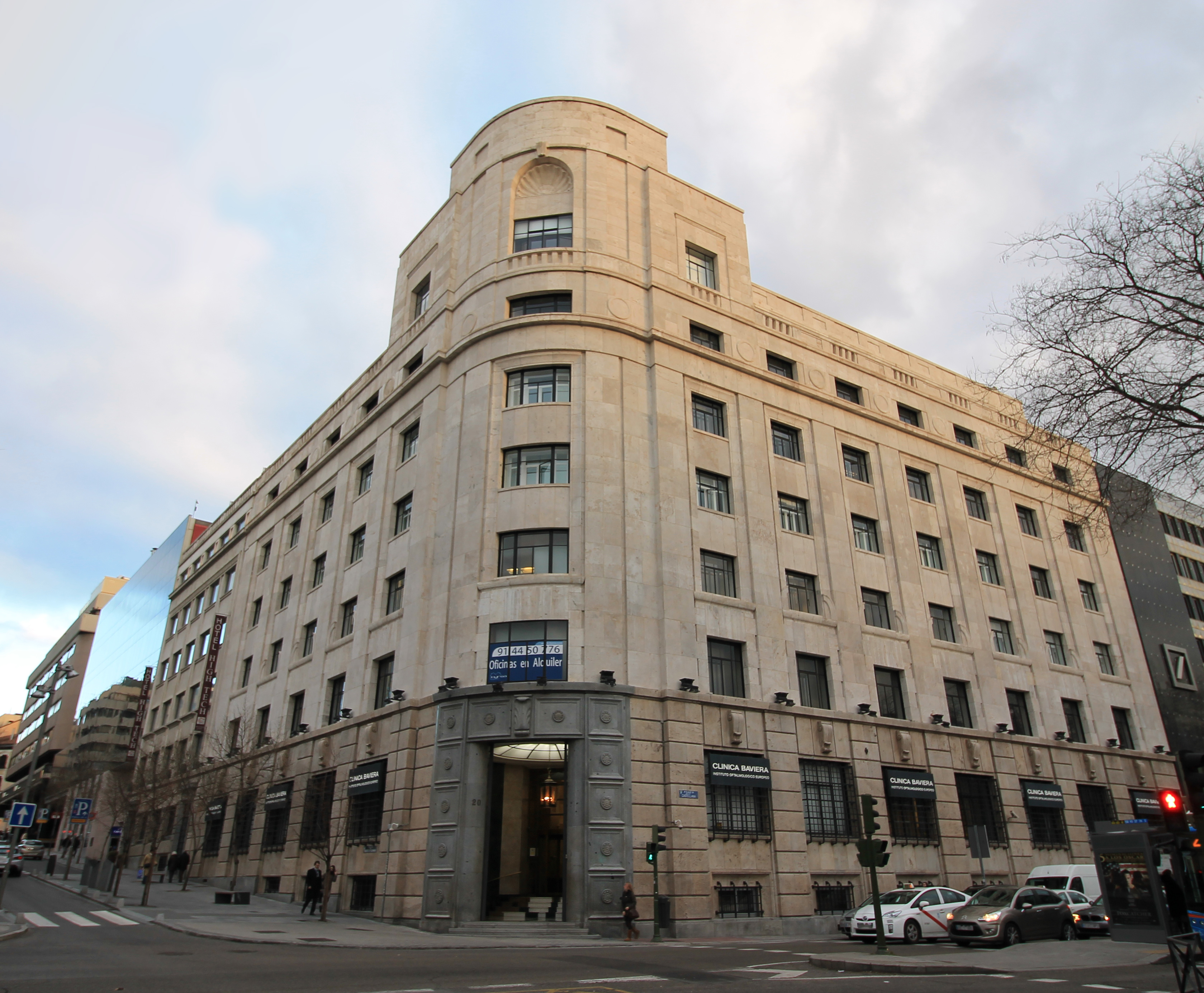
Former UEE headquarters on Madrid's Paseo de la Castellana, designed by Manuel Ignacio Galíndez.

After the end of the conflict, UEE moved its registered office from Bilbao to Madrid, specifically to number 20 Paseo de la Castellana. In 1941 the company acquired the Sotiel-Coronada mine and its facilities, in the province of Huelva, from the Compañía Anónima de Buitrón for 1,124,100 pesetas. During those years there were talks between UEE and the Rio Tinto Company Limited regarding the possibility of the former acquiring the Riotinto mines, although these did not come to fruition. In 1947 it formed a joint subsidiary with the company Cros, Productos Químicos Ibéricos, with the aim of dividing markets and establishing areas of influence between them.

During the early years of the Franco regime, the company underwent a period of consolidation, reorganizing in 1949 into six business divisions: fertilizers, chemical products, industrial explosives, military explosives, mining, and studies. The production and distribution of explosives remained UEE's main activity, with the Galdakao plant being the largest explosives factory in Spain. However, over the years the production of fertilizers and superphosphates gained greater weight, coinciding with a favorable economic climate that fostered the development of both sectors. UEE came to own a network of subsidiaries with a presence in the chemical industry. In 1970 (Note: On July 24, 1970, the agreement was signed under which the CEMRT and UEE merged to form the new Unión Explosivos Río Tinto.) it absorbed the Compañía Española de Minas de Río Tinto, thus giving birth to Unión Explosivos Río Tinto (ERT).

Over the following two decades, the ERT group undertook a business expansion that gave it a dominant position in the armaments and chemical sectors. However, the severe crisis experienced by Spanish industry during the 1980s negatively affected the corporate group and jeopardized its future.

=== Reorganization ===
When the Ercros holding company was created in 1989 from the merger of ERT and Cros, the "Unión Española de Explosivos" was reconstituted as a subsidiary of the new group, in charge of the military-strategic segment. However, the new conglomerate's financial situation was very fragile due to its heavy debt. After Ercros suspended payments in 1992, it decided to divest a large part of its subsidiaries. In 1993 it sold Unión Española de Explosivos to the Pallas Invest group, a European investment fund. From then on, the former UEE resumed its independent existence. Over the following years the company underwent a process of internal reorganization, which involved a considerable reduction in staff, as well as an international expansion that would give it a presence on all five continents. In 2006 the decision was made to adopt a new name, Maxam, as part of a change in image and structure.

== Bibliography ==
- Arenas Posadas, Carlos (2017). "Riotinto, el declive de un mito minero (1954-2003)" [Riotinto: The Decline of a Mining Legend (1954–2003)]. Revista de Historia Industrial (in Spanish) (69). Barcelona: University of Barcelona: 109–142. ISSN 1132-7200.
- de Diego García, Emilio (1996). Historia de la Industria en España. La química [History of Industry in Spain: Chemistry] (in Spanish). Madrid: EOI/Editorial Actas.
- Egea Bruno, Pedro María (1986). El distrito minero de Cartagena en torno a la primera Guerra Mundial (1909-1923) [The Cartagena Mining District Around the Time of World War I (1909–1923)] (in Spanish). University of Murcia.
- Flores Caballero, Manuel (2017). La nacionalización de las minas de Río Tinto y la formación de la compañía española [The nationalization of the Rio Tinto mines and the formation of the Spanish company] (in Spanish). Huelva: Servicio de publicaciones de la Universidad de Huelva.
- Martín Aceña, Pablo; Martínez Ruiz, Elena (2006). La economía de la guerra civil [The Economy of the Civil War] (in Spanish). Marcial Pons Historia.
- O'Connor, Bernard; Solano, Leyre (2014). The Spanish Phosphateers: the origins and development of Spain's phosphate industry. Lulu.com.
- Puig, Núria (1998). "The Frustrated Rise of Spanish Chemical Industry between the Wars". Determinants in the Evolution of the European Chemical Industry, 1900–1939. Springer-Science+Business Media, B.V.
- Ramírez Copeiro del Villar, Jesús (2006). "El ferrocarril de Buitrón y sus ramales" [Railroads in the Province of Huelva: A Journey Through the Past]. Los ferrocarriles en la provincia de Huelva: Un recorrido por el pasado (in Spanish). In: Emilio Romero Macías (dir.). University of Huelva: 177–205.
- Romero Macías, Emilio M. (2006). Los Ferrocarriles en la provincia de Huelva: Un recorrido por el pasado [Railroads in the Province of Huelva: A Journey Through the Past] (in Spanish). University of Huelva. ISBN 978-84-16061-73-0.
- Ruiz Ballesteros, Esteban (1998). Minería y poder. Antropología política en Riotinto [Mining and Power: Political Anthropology in Riotinto] (in Spanish). Diputación Provincial de Huelva.
- Sánchez Junco, José Fernando (2016). "MAXAM, una empresa global" [MAXAM, a global company]. Economistas (in Spanish) (148). Madrid: Colegio de Economistas de Madrid: 175–181. ISSN 0212-4386.
- Tamames, Ramón (1992). Estructura Económica de España [Spain's Economic Structure] (in Spanish). Alianza Editorial.
- Tomás, Carmen; Alonso, Ignacio (1993). El provocador. Carlos Solchaga, de la reconversión industrial a la crisis economíca y social [The Provocateur: Carlos Solchaga, from Industrial Restructuring to the Economic and Social Crisis] (in Spanish). Ediciones Temas de Hoy.

Additional bibliography

- Noceda, Miguel Ángel (1993-10-05). "Ercros vende su filial Unión Española de Explosivos al fondo europeo Pallas Invest" [Ercros sells its subsidiary Unión Española de Explosivos to the European fund Pallas Invest]. El País (in Spanish).
- Ortín, Alberto (2013). "Maxam, el grupo español más internacional y menos conocido" [Maxam, the most international and least known Spanish group]. Cinco Días (in Spanish).
