= Ercros =

Spanish chemical company

Ercros is a Spanish company in the chemical industry, headquartered in Barcelona. It is currently one of the leading chemical companies in Spain. Ercros is present in more than ninety countries.

== History ==
=== Origins and history ===
Ercros was born in 1989 from the merger of the Explosivos Río Tinto (ERT) group and the public limited company Cros. Towards the end of the 1980s, a process of merger between both conglomerates had begun. One of the main architects of this operation was the KIO group, the European subsidiary of the Kuwait Investments Office, which had controlled the Cros company for years. At the time of its creation, Ercros was the main chemical company in Spain, which in turn was a holding company present in numerous sectors. Its first president was Javier Vega de Seoane.

The new group was organized into five major business areas: mining, fertilizers, petrochemicals, chemicals, and defense/explosives. A new subsidiary, Erkimia, was created for the chemical division, while the historic company Unión Española de Explosivos was reconstituted for the explosives and defense division. For the fertilizer division, the assets of that business owned by ERT and Cros were concentrated, creating the company "Fertilizantes Españoles" (Fesa). At the same time, in 1989 Ercros acquired the former state-owned company Enfersa, which it merged with its subsidiary. Thus, one of the largest Spanish fertilizer companies was born, Fesa-Enfersa. Within the mining division, the company Río Tinto Minera stood out, followed by several smaller subsidiaries.

=== Financial crisis ===
By 1990, the Ercros conglomerate was made up of more than seventy subsidiaries and had a sales volume of 231,229 million pesetas. It also had a network of production centers and facilities throughout much of the country. Despite its preeminent position in the Spanish market, the holding 's financial situation was very fragile due to the large debts it had inherited from its predecessors. Already in August 1990, the value of Ercros shares on the stock market had depreciated by 36%. In this context, the KIO group began to leave the holding's shareholding, which further complicated the financial situation.

On July 8, 1992, Ercros declared bankruptcy, which at the time was one of the largest bankruptcy proceedings in Spanish history. By then, the group had a financial hole of 215 billion pesetas. Regarding the reasons for this outcome, some authors have even suggested that it was due to "the poor management of the KIO Group and its speculative ambitions." As a result of the economic downturn, several of the company's production centers were closed, while the workforce was significantly reduced. For this reason, during those years Ercros was also forced to sell a good part of its subsidiaries, such as Ertoil, Ertisa, Ership, Erkol, Río Tinto Minera, Fesa -Enfersa, Unión Española de Explosivos, etc.

=== Reorganization ===
The serious crisis that the company went through led to a profound internal reorganization, leaving sectors such as mining, fertilizers, etc. With a healthy financial situation, Ercros would begin a new stage at the beginning of the 2000s, although limited to the chemical industry sector and, to a lesser extent, to the pharmaceutical and animal feed sectors.

In 2005, it integrated the Aragonesas Group into its structure, after having taken control of it. A year later, in March 2006, it acquired the entire capital of the Derivados Forestales group, after which Ercros became the leading non-petrochemical Spanish chemical company.

In 2010, it sold its German subsidiary, Ercros Deutschland GmbH, dedicated to the emulsion business.

In 2016 Ercros augmented its investment in the Sabiñánigo chlorine plant.

In 2018 Ercros chose to outfit its plant in Huesca with Rittal-engineered automation products.

In April 2021 Ercros expanded its sodium chloride plant in Sabiñánigo. The plant also produces hydrogen peroxide and ammonia.

Ercros was profitable in 2021.

In 2021, the EIB financed Ercros for a euro 40 million "innovation, decarbonisation and modernisation strategy".

In July 2021 Ercros invested euro 20 million into its Aranjuez pharmaceutical plant, in order to produce vancomicin and gentamicin.

In 2022 Ercros carried a project in Madrid to create a pharmaceutical plant.

In September 2023 the regulators in Tarragona were worried about the impact of the pre-existing Ercros plant on a hotel development nearby. It was possible that a cloud of toxic gas would be emitted and the hotel guests could suffer. The Tarragona plant produces PVC plastics, a natural step for a firm which specializes in chlorine.

=== Takeover bids ===
In December 2023 Ercros obtained from nine bankers a loan facility of euro 217 million. The syndicate was led by Banco Santander, BBVA and CaixaBank. In July 2024 some of the shareholders of Ercros banded together to refuse competing takeover bids by Portuguese firm Bondalti, and Italian firm Esseco. Some pundits were critical of Bondalti's ability to manufacture sodium hypochlorate and caustic soda.
