= Rio Tinto Pier (Huelva, Spain) =

Former commercial pier or wharf in Spain

Rio Tinto Pier (Muelle de Rio Tinto)
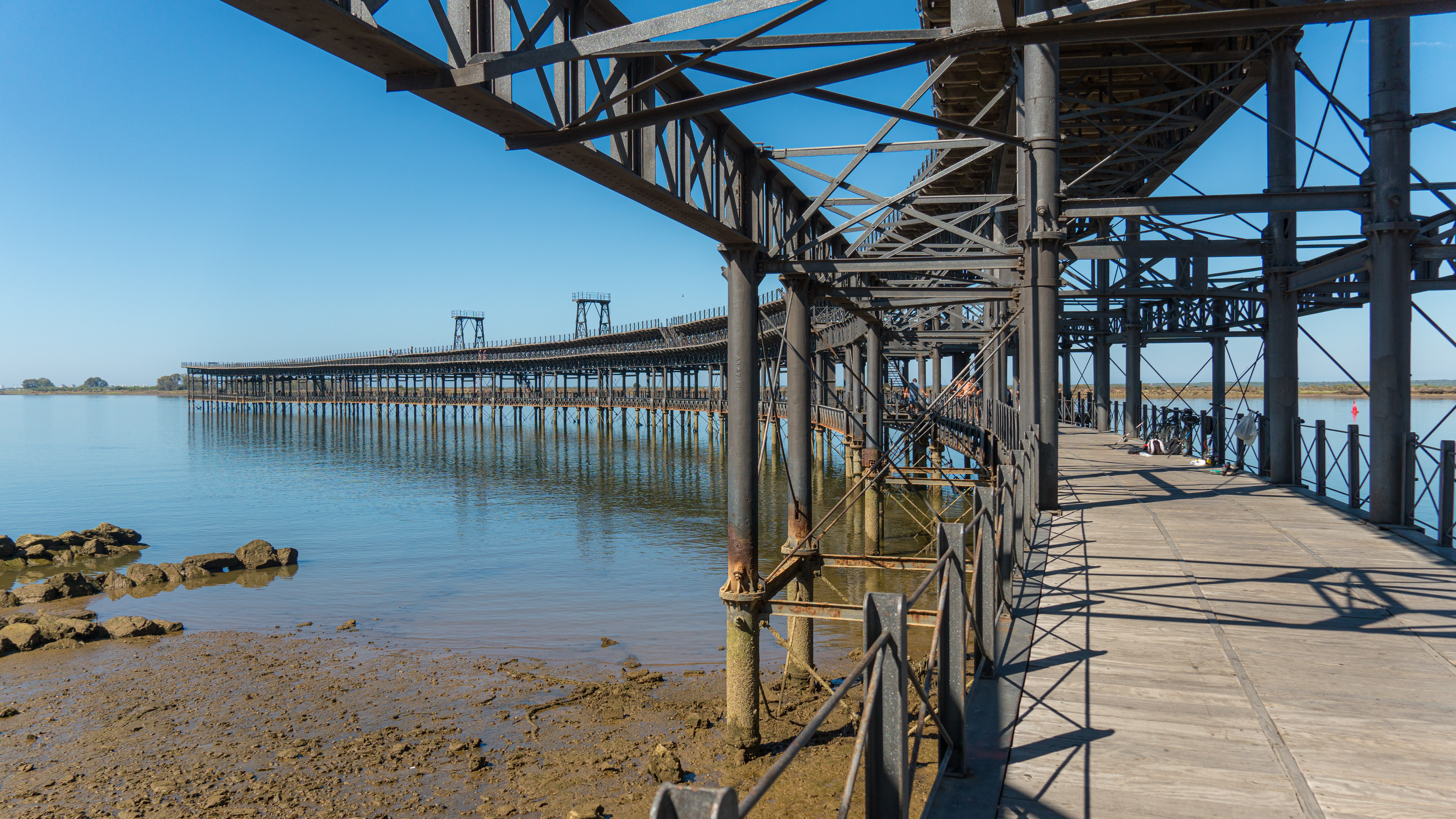
- The Pier in 2024.
- Interactive map of the Rio Tinto Pier (Muelle de Rio Tinto) area

General information
- Status: Restored
- Location: Huelva, Spain
- Coordinates: 37°15′04″N 6°57′29″W
- Elevation: Sea level
- Construction started: 1874
- Opened: 1876

Dimensions
- Other dimensions: 1165 meters long

Design and construction
- Architects: Sir George Barclay Bruce and Thomas Gibson
- Main contractor: John Dixon Company

The Rio Tinto Pier (Spanish: Muelle de Rio Tinto) was a commercial pier formerly used for the trade of material from the mines of the Rio Tinto Company in the province of Huelva, Spain. It is situated on the River Odiel in the city of Huelva. An estimated 150 million tons of ore were shipped from the pier over its life. Closed in 1975, it is now a popular tourist attraction and fishing spot. The pier is 1165 meters long, although part of that is built on reclaimed marshland.

== History ==
A site along the Rio Tinto had been mined since 3000 BCE. Over time, mining activities fell into neglect, until 1724 when the Spanish government began mining again. However, mining operations were inefficient, and the government itself was distracted by political and financial crises, leading it to sell the mines by auction in 1873.The syndicate purchasing the mine was led by Matheson and Company and, following purchase of the mine, the buyers launched the Rio Tinto Company. At the end of the 1880s, control of the firm passed to the Rothschild family, which greatly increased the scale of mining operations.

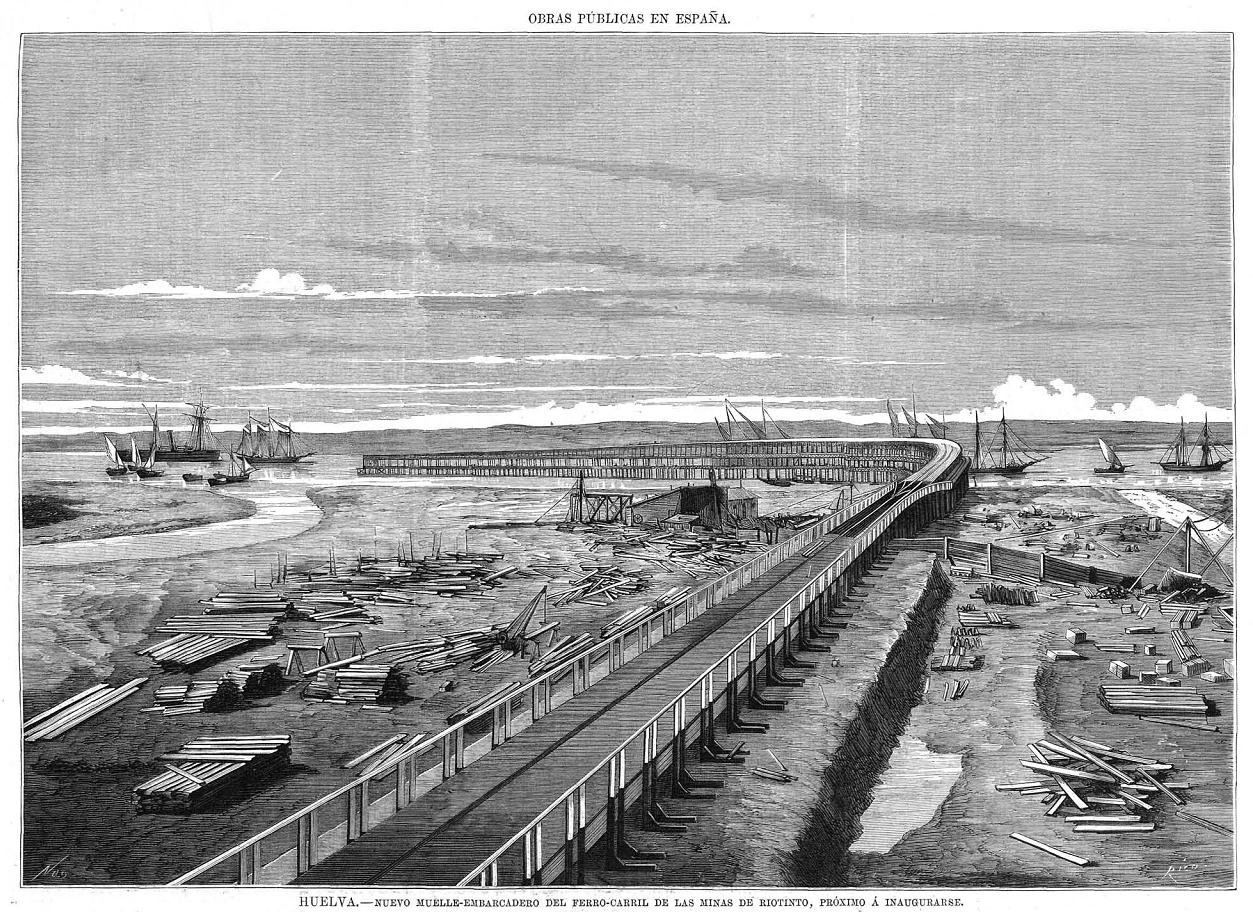
The pier under construction

The company needed to get the ore produced at the mines to Britain, so in the two years after purchase an 83-mile railway was built, following the course of the Rio Tinto, with four tunnels and ten bridges. This connected with the company's own pier at Huelva. The construction of both the railway and the wharf required British expertise and British troops were used to protect the workers. The mine and the choice of Huelva as the port had a significant impact on Huelva, which went from being a small fishing village to the world's leading port for copper exports.

The pier was designed by the engineers, Sir George Barclay Bruce and Thomas Gibson and was constructed between 1874 and 1876. Cast iron piles and columns were fabricated by Charles I'Anson, Son and Co of Darlington, England and the Stockton Forge Co. from Stockton on Tees. Both men already had considerable experience of railway and dock construction, including in Madras in India. It had two platforms. Ore-bearing trains ran on the upper platform and general goods trains to import supplies for the mine ran on the lower platform. There are many structural elements, some of which were added at a later stage to repair and reinforce sections of the dock. A characteristic that distinguishes this pier from the others of its time is that its foundation is on wooden platforms at the bottom of the estuary.

The Rio Tinto pier began with an initial 238-meter section formed by an earth embankment built on concrete and brick. For the next 225 meters, still on reclaimed land, it is on a wooden viaduct. From this point it stands on double rows of four cast iron pillars (60 rows of four pillars). When entering the river, it continues for about 200 meters at right angles to the bank and then forms a broad curve with a radius of about 200 meters, culminating in a new straight section of about 170 meters oriented in the direction of the current and the tides. In total this iron section was 577.6 meters long, although in 1974 about 50 meters of it was destroyed to make way for road widening.

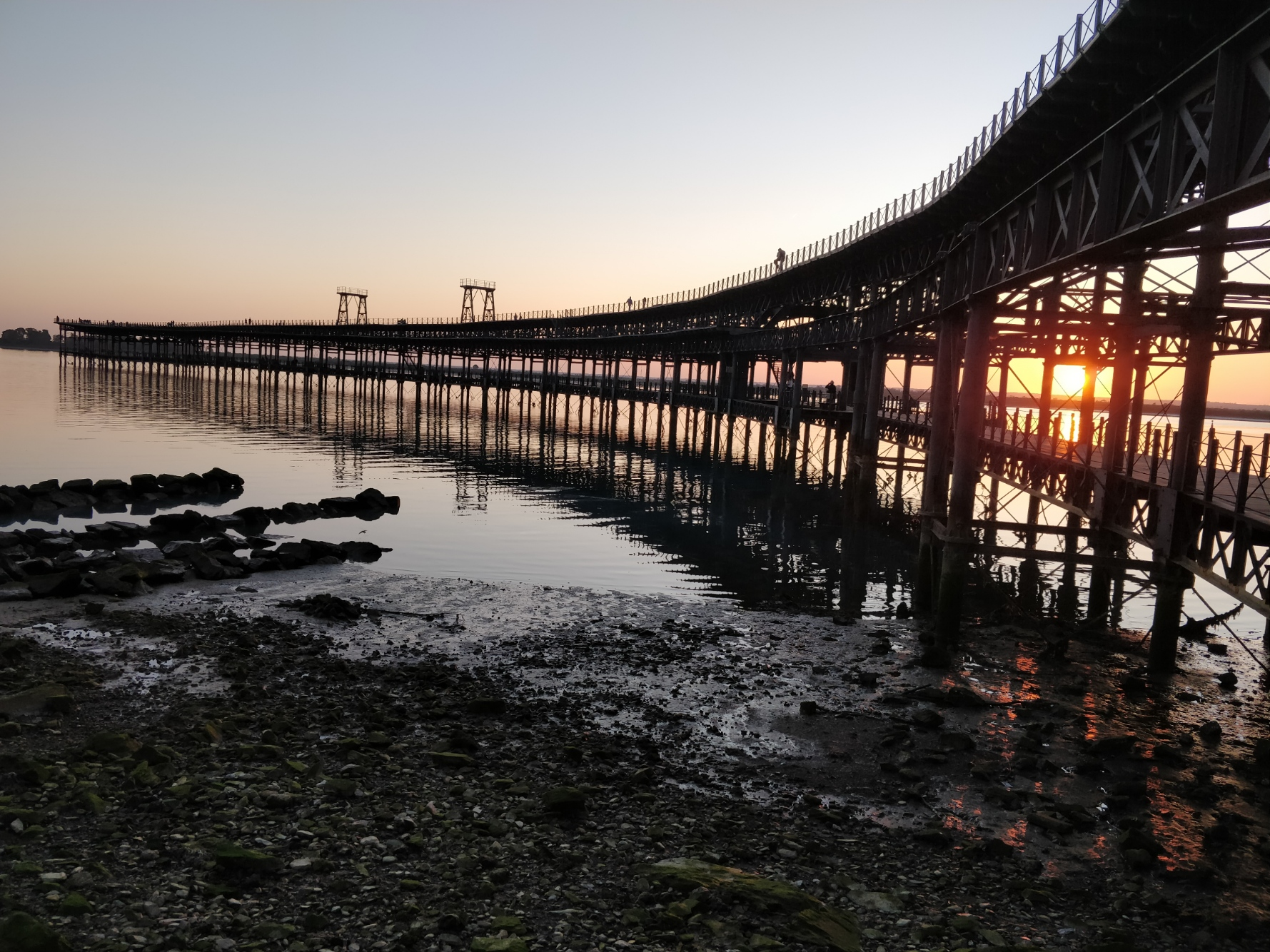
A view of the pier at sunset

The railway wagons reached the ships at the end of the pier using gravity. This consisted of arranging different ways of entry and exit of wagons to and from the wharf. Those going on to the pier descended from the top of the beginning of the pier to the end of the jetty. Following a change of points, the wagons return via a line that was also descending. Therefore, the unloading of the trucks was done without any mechanical system.

== Restoration ==
The pier remained in service until May 1975 when ships began to use a new facility in the nearby port of Huelva. Soon after that a section was removed to make way for widening of the road that goes along the river and the pier was effectively abandoned and fell into decline. In 1980 a contest was held for the reuse of the dock, but none of the ideas presented has ever been implemented. In 1990, initial repairs were finally carried out, with more detailed restoration following in 2006 with a budget of 14 million euros. At the start of the restoration the pier was lacking all of its wooden components.

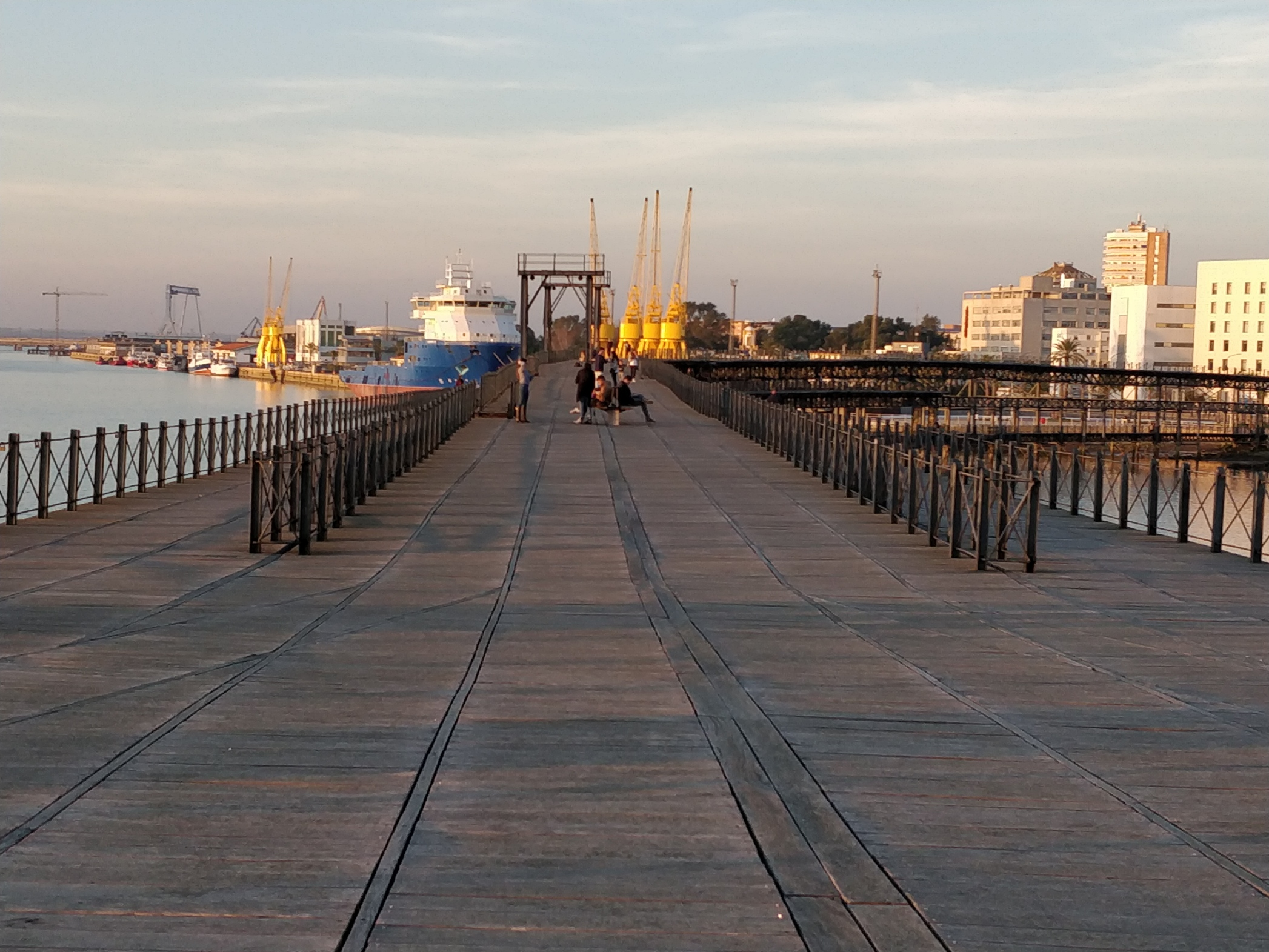
The photo shows the gravity system used to send the railway wagons to the end of the pier via the central track. A change of points enabled them to return to the beginning of the pier at a lower level to the left and right of the arrival track

== See also ==
- Compañía Española de Minas de Río Tinto

== Bibliography ==
- González Vílchez, Miguel (1978). El muelle de Riotinto (in Spanish). Diputación Provincial de Huelva/ Instituto de Estudios Onubenses "Padre Marchena". ISBN 84-500-2760-8.
- González Vílchez, Miguel (1981). Historia de la arquitectura inglesa en Huelva (in Spanish). Universidad de Sevilla.
- Harvey, Charles E. (1981). The Rio Tinto Company: An Economic History of a Leading International Mining Concern, 1873-1954. Alison Hodge Publishers. ISBN 978-0-906720-03-5.
