= Royal Border Bridge =

- Royal Border Bridge, showing 26 of the bridge's 28 arches.
- Coordinates: 55.772°N 2.014°W
- Carries: Railway
- Crosses: River Tweed
- Locale: Northumberland
- Heritage status: Grade I listed

Characteristics
- Material: Brick, faced with stone
- Total length: 659 metres (2,162 ft)
- No. of spans: 28

History
- Designer: Robert Stephenson
- Construction start: 1847
- Construction end: 1850

Location
- Interactive map of Royal Border Bridge

The Royal Border Bridge spans the River Tweed between Berwick-upon-Tweed and Tweedmouth in Northumberland, England. It is a Grade I listed railway viaduct built between 1847 and 1850, when it was opened by Queen Victoria. It was designed by Robert Stephenson (son of railway pioneer George Stephenson). It was built for the York, Newcastle and Berwick Railway and is still in regular use today, as part of the East Coast Main Line. Despite its name, the bridge does not in fact span the border between England and Scotland, which is approximately three miles further north.

The bridge is 659 metres (2,162 ft) long and constructed in stone except for brick soffits to the arches. It has 28 arches, each spanning 60 feet (18 m). The railway is carried 37 metres (121 ft) above the river level. During 1989, it was electrified as a part of the wider East Coast Main Line electrification scheme. Between 1993 and 1996, the structure underwent significant repair work for the first time in a Railtrack-led project, which was partially funded by English Heritage.

== Construction ==
The Royal Border Bridge has its origins in the ambitions of Newcastle and Berwick Railway (N&BR) company, which was formed in 1845 under the control of the prolific railway financier and politician George Hudson. Almost immediately following its founding, the N&BR's proposed line was authorised by an Act of Parliament and construction work had commenced by July 1845. While much of the line was completed within two years of this date, work upon several major structures, including the Royal Border Bridge, had barely begun.

In order to construct the line along the surveyed route, the completion of several major structures, such as the High Level Bridge in Newcastle and the Royal Border Bridge itself, was necessary to traverse terrain features. In the case of the Royal Border Bridge, it was required to take the line over the River Tweed at a site close to the town of Berwick-upon-Tweed, Northumberland. During 1847, Hudson was instrumental in the merger of the N&BR with another of his business interests, the York and Newcastle Railway (Y&NR) to form the York, Newcastle and Berwick Railway (YN&BR). This combined entity sought to complete a continuous line between the British capital cities of London and Edinburgh.

The company's chief engineer, and thus the individual most crucial to the completion of the desired line, was the noted railway engineer Robert Stephenson, who was the son of the railway pioneer George Stephenson. Regardless of Stephenson's presence at the YN&BR, the majority of the planning and engineering was undertaken by the civil engineer Thomas Elliot Harrison, albeit this work was performed under Stephenson's supervision. In particular, Stephenson typically played a hands-on role in the design of the key bridges along the envisioned route, although some of the detailed work was commonly performed by other figures as well.

The viaduct, which is constructed on a gentle curve, was a conventional masonry structure. It consists of 28 arches, 15 of which being over land to the south of the River Tweed and 13 over the river itself; these were set out in two groups separated by a stop pier. Masonry is used throughout the structure, which is complete with brickwork soffits that form the arches' undersides, and covered by stone cladding. The greatest height of the structure is 38.4 metres, which is located at the deepest point of the riverbed below. Possessing a total length of 658 metres, each of the bridge's over-arch spans measures 18.6 metres. The contract for the bridge's construction pertained to a one-mile length of the route; the non-masonry sections consist of earth embankments.

On 15 May 1847, the foundation stone for what would become the Royal Border Bridge, which was then simply referred to as the Tweed Viaduct, was laid. The Cumberland-based construction firm McKay & Blackstock were appointed to build the structure, while the civil engineer George Barclay Bruce, a former apprentice of Stephenson's, was selected to serve as the resident engineer, being responsible overseeing the day-to-day work at the site. Reportedly, the construction of the Royal Border Bridge consumed 8 million cubic feet (227,000 cubic metres) of stone; the inner part of the arches alone required 2.5 million bricks. Many of the same techniques that had been employed in the construction of Newcastle's High Level Bridge were shared with this structure as well. At the height of construction activity, the workforce is believed to have involved upwards of 2,700 men.

Detailed view of four arches

During the designing of the structure, particular attention was paid to the foundations of the bridge. Firmly anchoring the bridge involved the driving of many piles into the bedrock, which could be reached only by going through roughly 12 metres of dense gravel above; this task was considerably aided by the application of a patented Nasmyth steam-powered pile driver. In order to control and effectively drain away water at the site, several deep cofferdams were constructed which, along with several steam-driven pumps, worked together to keep out the water.

The first elements of the structure to be completed were the 15 land arches, along with the stop pier; during the construction of the remaining arches, this functioned as a buttress. The river piers were deliberately shaped at water level in such a manner that sheets of ice flowing in the river would be broken up on contact with the bridge; this process was aided by the embedding of several iron bars into the masonry for greater strength. This feature was covered by later alterations to the piers, which were performed as a part of measures made to accommodate for an extra rail track.

== Operations ==
While the permanent structure was still under construction, several temporary timber viaducts were deployed and used by early train services, as well as by construction-related traffic. In this fashion, the overall route could be opened without having to wait for the completion of the Royal Border Bridge, somewhat alleviating pressure from investors. This decision proved beneficial as, while the permanent structure had been intended to be completed in July 1849, it was not ready to carry rail traffic until March 1850. On 29 August 1850, the bridge was officially opened in a ceremony officiated by the reigning monarch, Queen Victoria, and Prince Albert; it was at this event that the Queen consented for the structure to be formally named as the Royal Border Bridge.

During 1989, as a part of the East Coast Main Line electrification program, the structure was modified by British Rail to accommodate the installation of electrification gantries. As a consequence of the Royal Border Bridge having been recognised with Grade I listed status, the overhead line infrastructure used was specially designed for a reduced visual impact on the bridge and had to be reviewed and approved by the Royal Fine Art Commission prior to its installation. The installation allows for electric traction to traverse the bridge.

After having stood for 143 years as a major part of the East Coast Main Line, the Royal Border Bridge underwent significant maintenance for the first time during 1993. The restoration program, which was largely focused upon repairs to the 15 land based arches, was undertaken as a joint project between the newly founded railway infrastructure maintenance firm Railtrack and English Heritage.

During early 2010, plans were mooted for the installation of a night-time illumination scheme upon the Royal Border Bridge; at the time, this measure was promoted as being a commemoration of the 150th anniversary of the death of Robert Stephenson. Originally meant to be operational by November 2010, weather conditions, particularly ice, damaged underwater cables, delaying the illumination and preventing some lights from functioning. In January 2012, Northumberland County Council filed its application for a permanent lighting system to be installed. During 2016, the bridge was fitted with colour-changing lights; the installation being completed in time for the structure's 160th anniversary.

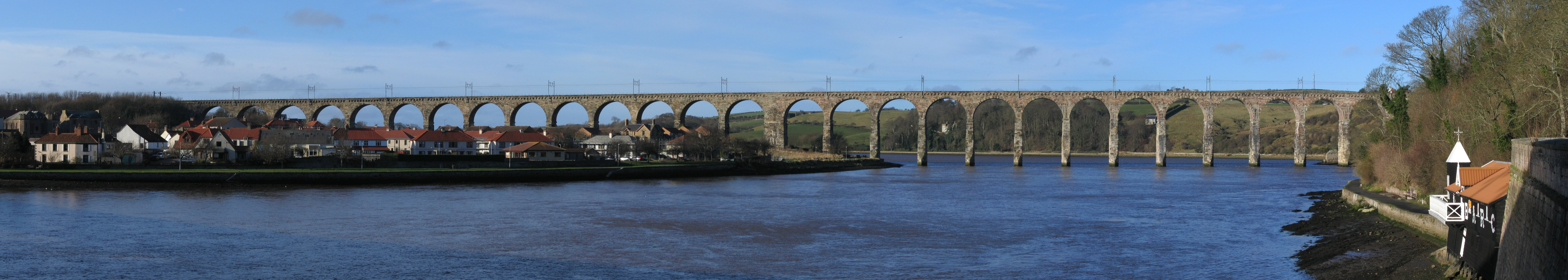
Royal Border Bridge with 27 of the 28 arches in view
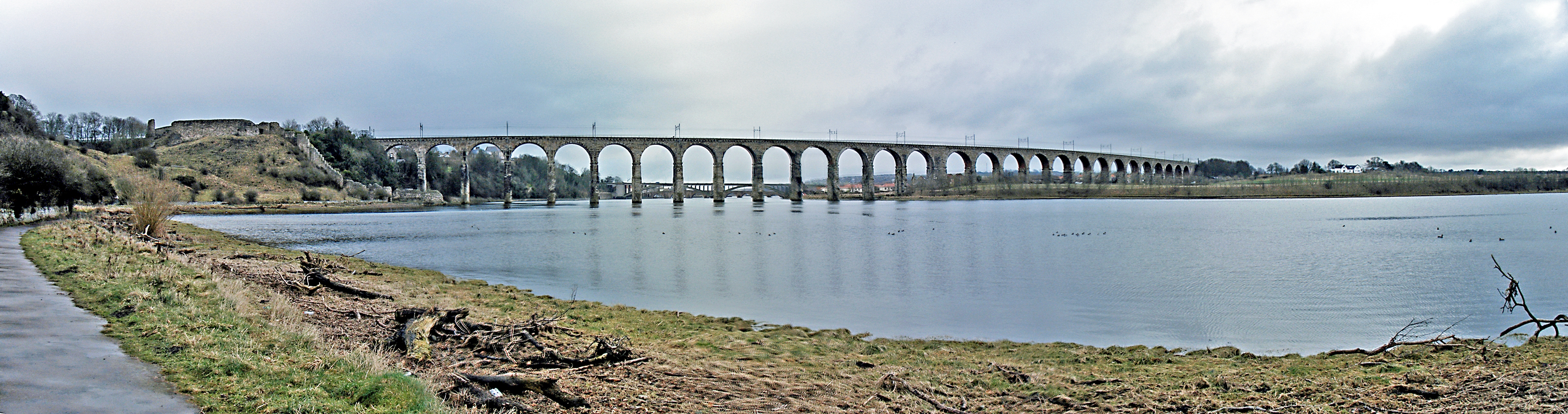
A panorama from up-river, showing all 28 arches of the Royal Border Bridge over the River Tweed
A TransPennine Express British Rail Class 802 crosses Royal Border Bridge, Berwick upon Tweed
