= Minas de Riotinto =

- Municipality
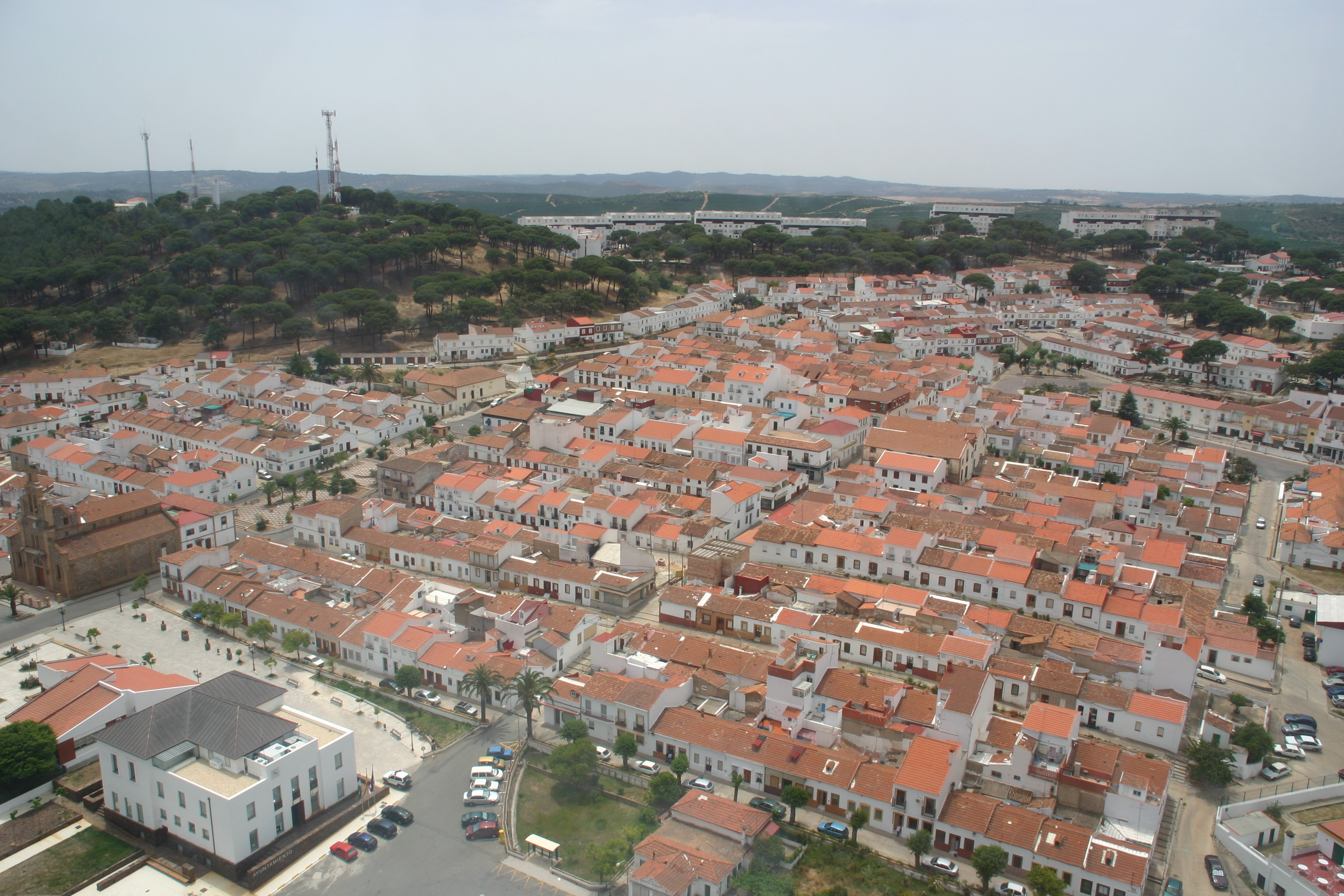

- Flag Coat of arms

- Location in the Province of Huelva Location in Andalusia Location in Spain
- Coordinates: 37°41′N 6°35′W
- Country: Spain
- Autonomous community: Andalusia
- Province: Huelva
- Comarca: Cuenca Minera

Government
  - Mayor: Rocío Díaz Cano (PSOE-A)

Area
  - Total: 24 km^{2} (9.3 sq mi)
- Elevation: 426 m (1,398 ft)

Population (2025-01-01)
  - Total: 3,698
  - Density: 150/km^{2} (400/sq mi)
- Demonym: Riotinteños
- Time zone: UTC+1 (CET)
  - Summer (DST): UTC+2 (CEST)
- Postal code: 21660
- Official language(s): Spanish
- Website: Official website

Minas de Riotinto is a town and municipality located in the province of Huelva, in the Autonomous Community of Andalusia, southern Spain.

Minas de Riotinto also comprises the neighborhoods known as El Alto de la Mesa and La Dehesa.

== See also ==
- Cerro Colorado mining deposit
- Rio Tinto Group
- Corta Atalaya
- Riotinto Railway
- List of municipalities in Huelva
