= Atalaya Mining =

Mining company focussed on copper deposits

- Type: Public
- Traded as: LSE: ATYM
- Industry: Mining
- Founded: 2004; 22 years ago
- Founder: Aristidis (Harry) Anagnostaras Adams; Ron Cunneen
- Headquarters: Seville, Spain
- Key people: Roger Davey (chairman); Alberto Lavandeira (CEO)
- Revenue: ▲€482.9 million (2025)
- Operating income: ▲€110.8 million (2025)
- Net income: ▲€85.4 million (2025)
- Website: atalayamining.com

Atalaya Mining Copper S.A. , trading as Atalaya Mining, is a mining company focussed on copper deposits in Spain. It is listed on the London Stock Exchange and is a constituent of the FTSE 250 Index.

== History ==
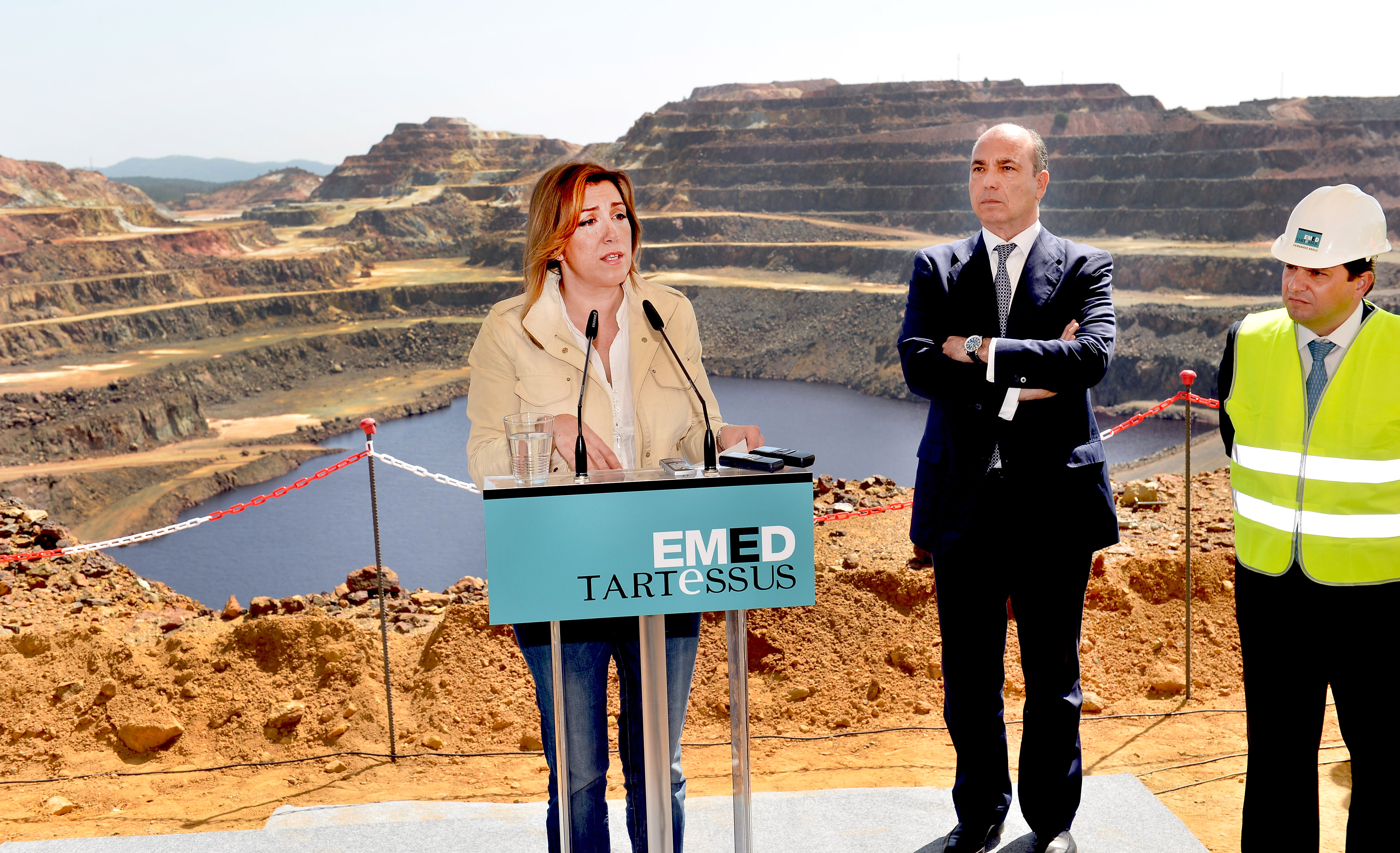
President of the Regional Government of Andalusia Susana Díaz visiting the Cerro Colorado mining deposit, 2014

The company was founded by Aristidis (Harry) Anagnostaras-Adams and Ron Cunneen in Cyprus in September 2004. It was listed on the Alternative Investment Market as Eastern Mediterranean Resources in May 2005, and then changed its name to EMED Mining in September 2006.

In July 2010, the company applied for a mining permit to develop the Cerro Colorado mining deposit, also known as Minas del Rey Salomón (Mines of King Solmon), in the Riotinto-Nerva mining basin in the province of Huelva, Andalusia. The permit was granted in January 2015. The company started commercial production of copper at the mine in Andalusia in February 2016 and then changed its name from EMED Mining to Atalaya Mining in October 2016.

The company expanded its interests in Andalusia, when it purchased the Masa Valverde polymetallic project in October 2020, and went on to acquire three investigation permits in the Riotinto East area in May 2021.

The company transferred from the Alternative Investment Market to the main market of the London Stock Exchange in April 2024. It re-domiciled its place of business from Cyprus to Spain and also changed its name to Atalaya Mining Copper SA in January 2025.
