= Unión Explosivos Río Tinto =

Defunct Spanish business conglomerate

- Company type: S.A.
- Industry: Mining, explosives, chemicals
- Founded: 1970
- Defunct: 1989
- Successor: Ercros
- Headquarters: Madrid

The Unión Explosivos Río Tinto (ERT) was a Spanish business conglomerate that operated between 1970 and 1989, being present in many industries of the country. At the time, it was the main Spanish business group by size and assets, with a network of companies that included more than forty subsidiaries.

== History ==
The ERT group, which started in 1970, was present in numerous sectors of the economy: mining, metallurgy, chemical industry, petrochemical industry, explosives, etc. In its beginnings, it had a workforce made up of 14,000 employees, as well as a network of facilities, factories and production centers that extended throughout the country. Its name came from the historical Rio Tinto Mines, in the province of Huelva. During the 1970s, the Explosivos Río Tinto group undertook a business diversification that led to an increase of its presence in the real estate, pharmaceutical, petrochemical or publishing sectors. This was carried out through loans and significant indebtedness. In 1989, after many years of crisis due to financial problems, ERT was integrated into the holding Ercros.

== See also ==
- Compañía Española de Minas de Río Tinto

== Bibliography ==
- Angulo, Cristina (1998). "Una historia muy explosiva". El País.
- Fourneau, Francis (1980). Huelva hacia el desarrollo: evolución de la provincia de Huelva durante los veinte últimos años. Diputación de Huelva/Instituto de Estudios Onubenses "Padre Marchena".
- Tamames, Ramón; Rueda, Antonio (1998). Introducción a la economía española. Madrid: Alianza Editorial.
