= Sierra de Aracena and Picos de Aroche Natural Park =

Protected area in Huelva Province, Spain

Coordinates: 37°57′35″N 6°35′07″W

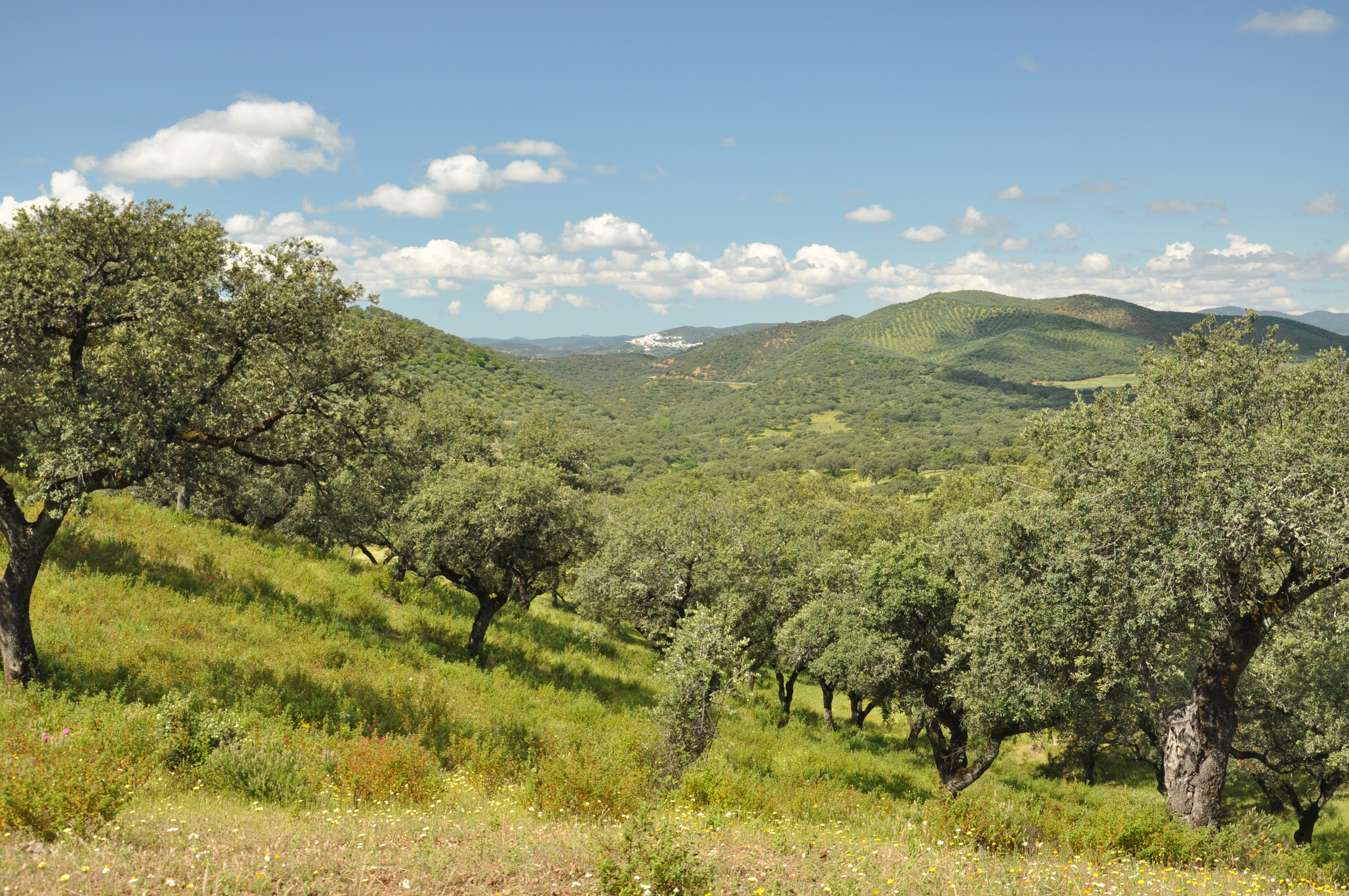
View of the Sierra de Aracena.

Sierra de Aracena and Picos de Aroche Natural Park (Spanish: Parque natural de Sierra de Aracena y Picos de Aroche) is a protected area in the Sierra de Aracena range, part of the Sierra Morena mountain system, Huelva Province, southwestern Spain.

The natural park spreads across 28 municipalities with a population of 41,000 people. Rivers which run through it include the Odiel and Murtigas.

== Villages ==
The following villages are within the limits of the Park: Alájar, Almonaster la Real, Aracena, Aroche, Arroyomolinos de León, Cala, Cañaveral de León, Castaño del Robledo, Corteconcepción, Cortegana, Cortelazor, Cumbres de Enmedio, Cumbres de San Bartolomé, Cumbres Mayores, Encinasola, Fuenteheridos, Galaroza, Higuera de la Sierra, Hinojales, Jabugo, Linares de la Sierra, Los Marines, La Nava, Puerto Moral, Santa Ana la Real, Santa Olalla del Cala, Valdelarco and Zufre.
