= Cuenca Minera (Huelva) =

Coordinates: 37°41′39″N 6°35′08″W

- Comarca
- Country: Spain
- Autonomous community: Andalusia
- Province: Huelva
- Capital: Minas de Riotinto

Area
  - Total: 628 km^{2} (242 sq mi)

Population (2024) (Note: Census at 1 January 2024, National Statistics Institute (Spain))
  - Total: 15,019
  - Density: 23.9/km^{2} (61.9/sq mi)
- Time zone: UTC+1 (CET)
  - Summer (DST): UTC+2 (CEST)

Cuenca Minera is a comarca (county) (with no administrative role) in Andalusia, southern Spain. It is located in the western part of the province of Huelva, bounded eastwards by the province of Seville, from south by the comarca of El Condado and from north by the Sierra de Huelva.

== Municipalities ==
The comarca includes the following municipalities.

Arms	Municipality	Area (km^{2})	Population (2024) (Note: Census at 1 January 2024, National Statistics Institute (Spain))	Density (/km^{2})
	Berrocal	126.0	288	2.29
	Campofrío	48.0	724	15.08
	El Campillo	90.72	2,014	22.20
	La Granada de Riotinto	44.70	244	5.46
	Minas de Riotinto	23.31	3,713	159.29
	Nerva	55.0	5,073	92.23
	Zalamea la Real	238.86	2,963	12.40
	Total	626.59	15,019	23.97

== Bibliography ==
- García, Francisco Javier; Delgado, Aquilino (2016). "Patrimonio y Turismo en la Cuenca Minera de Riotinto". Río Tinto. Historia, patrimonio minero y turismo cultural (in Spanish). Universidad de Huelva/ Fundación Río Tinto.
