= Fuenteheridos =

Coordinates: 37°54′N 6°39′W

- Flag Coat of arms

- Location in Spain.
- Country: Spain
- Autonomous community: Andalusia
- Province: Huelva

Area
  - Total: 10.92 km^{2} (4.22 sq mi)
- Elevation: 712 m (2,336 ft)

Population (2025-01-01)
  - Total: 804
  - Density: 73.6/km^{2} (191/sq mi)
- Time zone: UTC+1 (CET)
  - Summer (DST): UTC+2 (CEST)

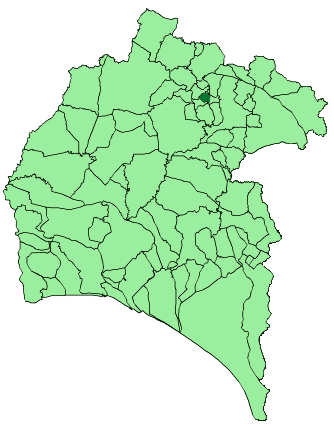
Map of Fuenteheridos, Huelva

Fuenteheridos is a town and municipality located in the province of Huelva, Spain. According to the 2025 municipal register, there are 804 inhabitants.

Situated near the N-433 road, it is rarely busy except on warm evenings. The square is surrounded by a few bars and the Fuente de Doce Caños (Fountain of 12 jets). An 18th-century stone cross, sourced from a nearby quarry, adds to its historical interest. A number of the houses in the village square feature original wooden balconies and colorful summer flowers.

The church Iglesia del Espíritu Santo, dating back to the 18th century, is a locally visible landmark. The old village threshing circle offers panoramic valley views. A stroll from the nearby car park along a water channel featuring plaques dedicated to Fuenteheridos, leads to the source of the Murtigas River.

The village serves as a gateway to various countryside walks, including routes to neighboring villages and towns like Alájar, Galaroza, Castaño, Los Marines, and Aracena, and provides many opportunities for exploration.

José Bergamín, a prominent writer, bohemian and intellectual, sought refuge in Fuenteheridos in his twilight years. His experiences, exile and disillusionment, particularly over the Spanish civil war, led to seminal works like "Waiting for the Hand of Snow".

== See also ==
- List of municipalities in Huelva
