= Las Capellanías =

Prehistoric funerary complex in Spain

Coordinates: 38°01′N 6°31′W

Las Capellanías is a prehistoric funerary complex in Cañaveral de León, Huelva, Spain.

== Excavations ==
Excavation in the area began after road construction workers found a stela in June 2018, and was carried out by staff and students from the universities of Seville, Huelva and Durham. The necropolis was discovered in 2022.

== Artifacts ==
Another stela, found in 2023, has carvings including depictions of a headdress and necklace, usually associated with female burials, but also two swords and male genitalia. It has been described as "gender-bending" and "showing that the social roles depicted by these standardized iconographies were more fluid than previously thought".
