= List of municipalities in Huelva =

Map of Spain with the province of Huelva highlighted

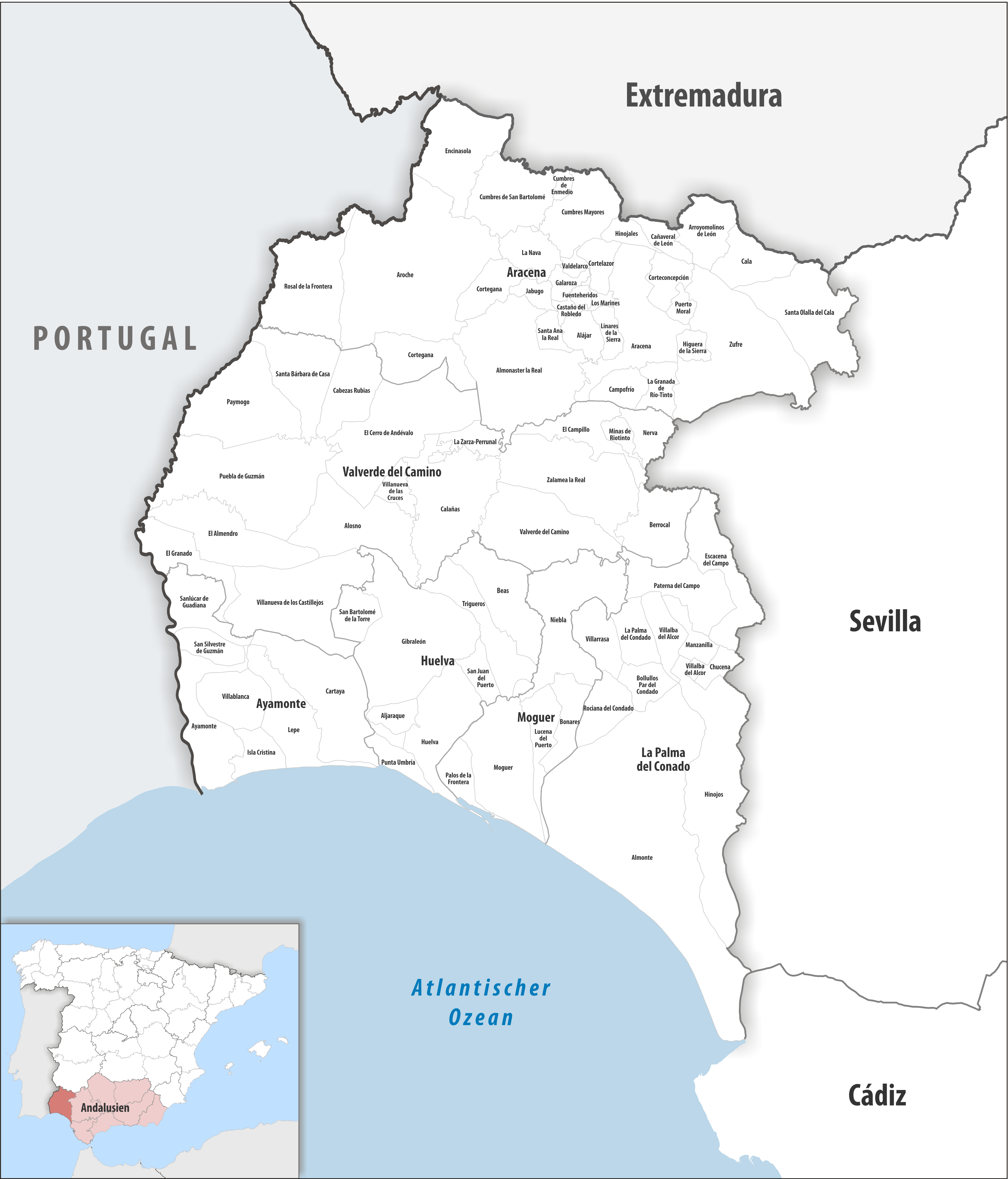
Map of the municipalities in the province of Huelva

Huelva is a province in the autonomous community of Andalusia, Spain. The province is divided into 79 municipalities. As of the 2024 Spanish census, Huelva is the 29th most populous of Spain's 50 provinces, with 535,734 inhabitants, and the 25th largest by land area, spanning 10,127.43 square kilometres (3,910.22 sq mi). Municipalities are the most basic local political division in Spain and can only belong to one province. They enjoy a large degree of autonomy in their local administration, being in charge of tasks such as urban planning, water supply, lighting, roads, local police, and firefighting.

The organisation of municipalities in Spain is outlined by the local government law Ley 7/1985, de 2 de abril, Reguladora de las Bases del Régimen Local (transl. Law 7/1985, of 2 April, Regulating the Bases of the Local Administration), which was passed by the Cortes Generales—Spain’s national parliament—on 2 April 1985 and finalised by royal decree on 18 April 1986. Municipalities in Huelva are also governed by the Statute of Autonomy of Andalusia, which includes provisions concerning their relations with Andalusia's autonomous government. All citizens of Spain are required to register in the municipality in which they reside. Each municipality is a corporation (Note: Within the context of local government in Spain, a corporation is a legal entity representing a municipality. Each municipality is empowered to govern over a specific piece of land and its population.) with independent legal personhood: its governing body is called the ayuntamiento (municipal council or corporation), a term often also used to refer to the municipal offices (city and town halls). The ayuntamiento is composed of the mayor (Spanish: alcalde), the deputy mayors (tenientes de alcalde) and the councillors (concejales), who form the plenary (pleno), the deliberative body. Municipalities are categorised by population for determining the number of councillors: three when the population is up to 100 inhabitants, five for 101–250, seven for 251–1,000, nine for 1,001–2,000, eleven for 2,001–5,000, thirteen for 5,001–10,000, seventeen for 10,001–20,000, twenty-one for 20,001–50,000, and twenty-five for 50,001–100,000. One councillor is added for every additional 100,000 inhabitants, with a further one included if the total would otherwise be even, to avoid tied votes.

The mayor and the deputy mayors are elected by the plenary assembly, which is itself elected by universal suffrage. Elections in municipalities with more than 250 inhabitants are carried out following a proportional representation system with closed lists, whilst those with a population lower than 250 use a block plurality voting system with open lists. The plenary assembly must meet periodically, with meetings occurring more or less frequently depending on the population of the municipality: monthly for those whose population is larger than 20,000, once every two months if it ranges between 5,001 and 20,000, and once every three months if it does not exceed 5,000. Many ayuntamientos also have a local governing board (Spanish: junta de gobierno local), which is appointed by the mayor from amongst the councillors and is required for municipalities of over 5,000 inhabitants. The board, whose role is to assist the mayor between meetings of the plenary assembly, may not include more than one third of the councillors.

The largest municipality by population in the province as of the 2024 Spanish census is Huelva, its capital, with 143,526 residents, while the smallest is Cumbres de Enmedio, with 61 residents. The largest municipality by area is Almonte, which spans 859.65 square kilometres (331.91 sq mi), while Los Marines is the smallest at 9.98 square kilometres (3.85 sq mi).

== Municipalities ==
Largest municipalities in the province of Huelva by population

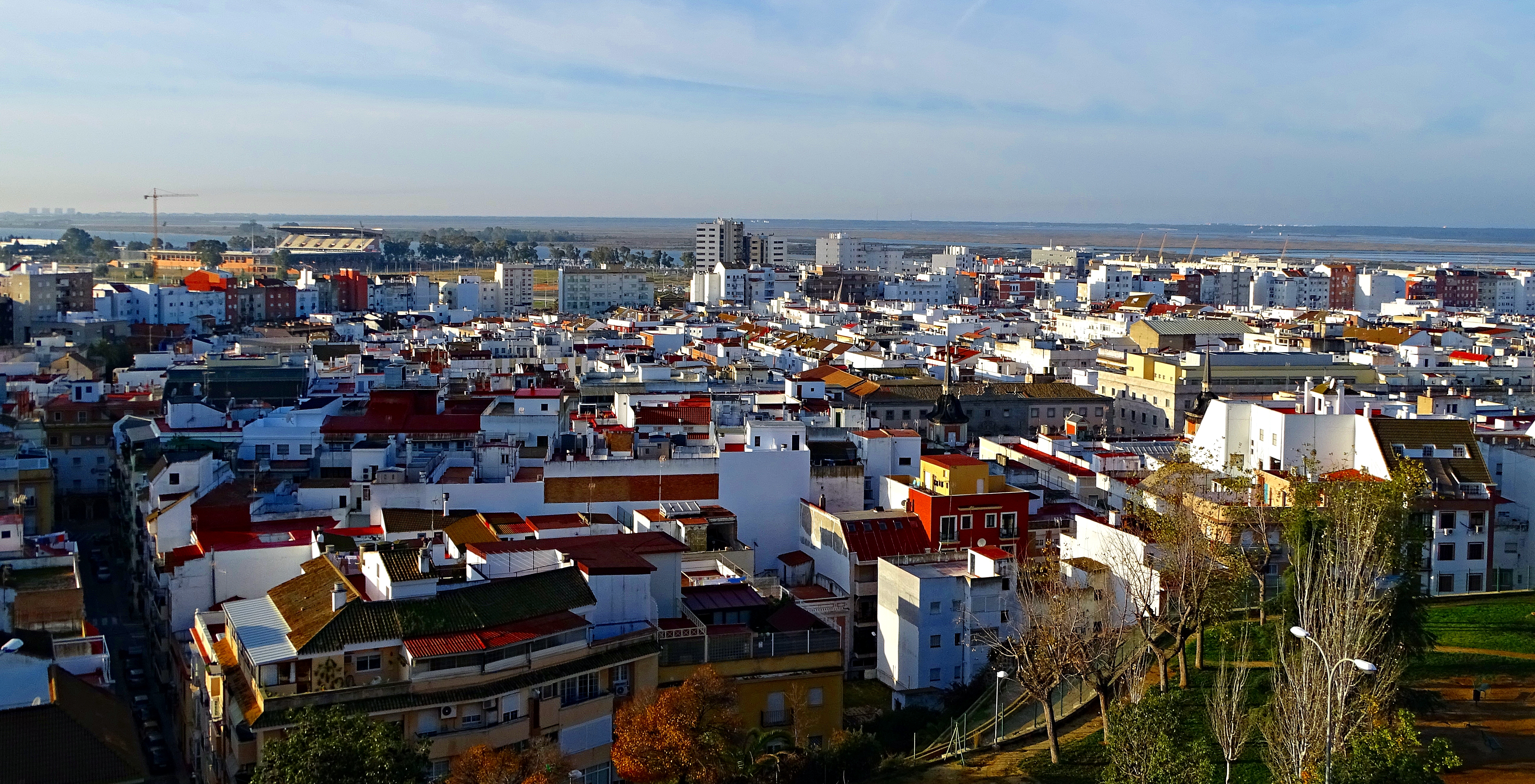
Huelva is the province's capital and largest municipality by population.

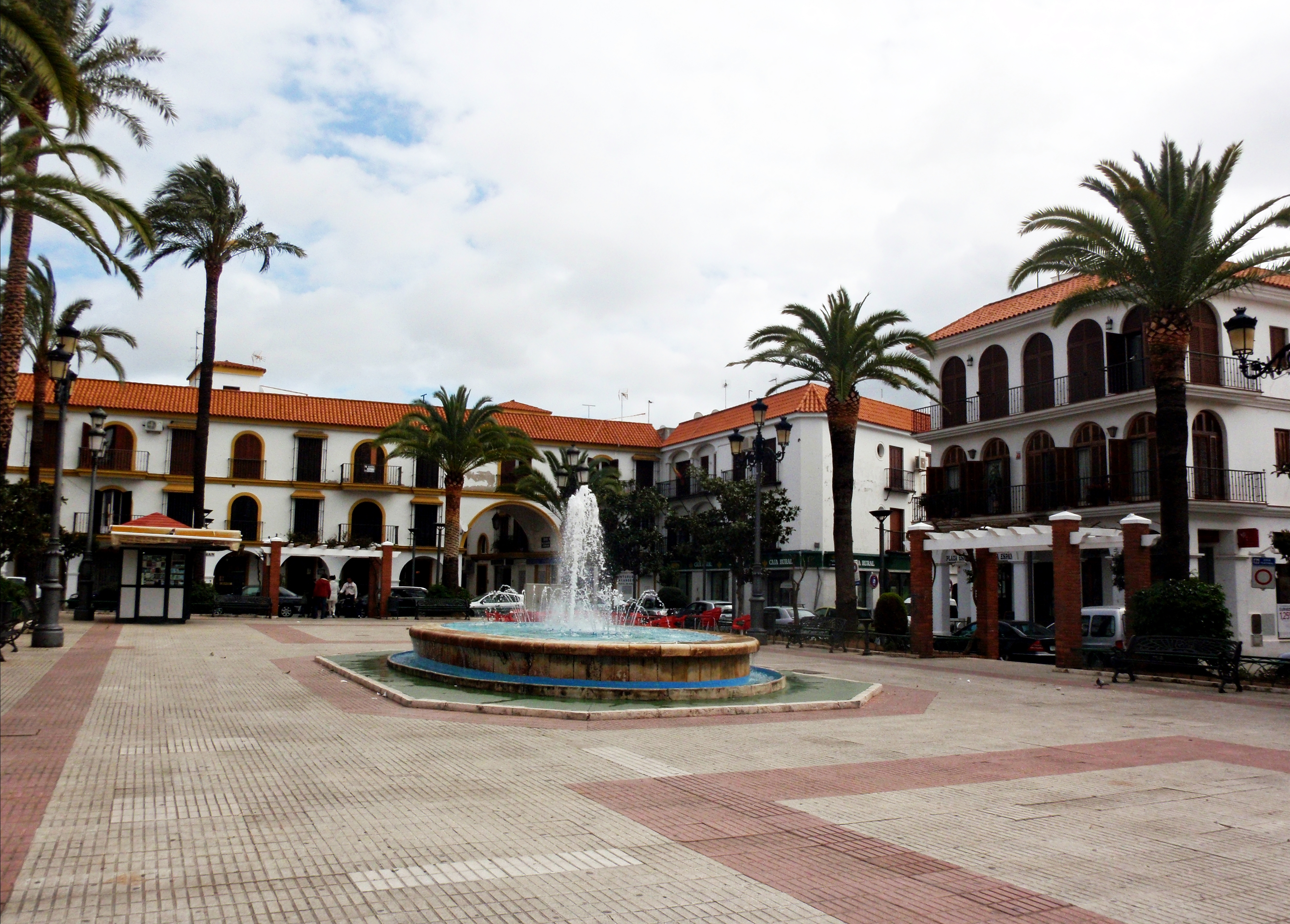
Lepe, the second largest municipality by population in the province of Huelva

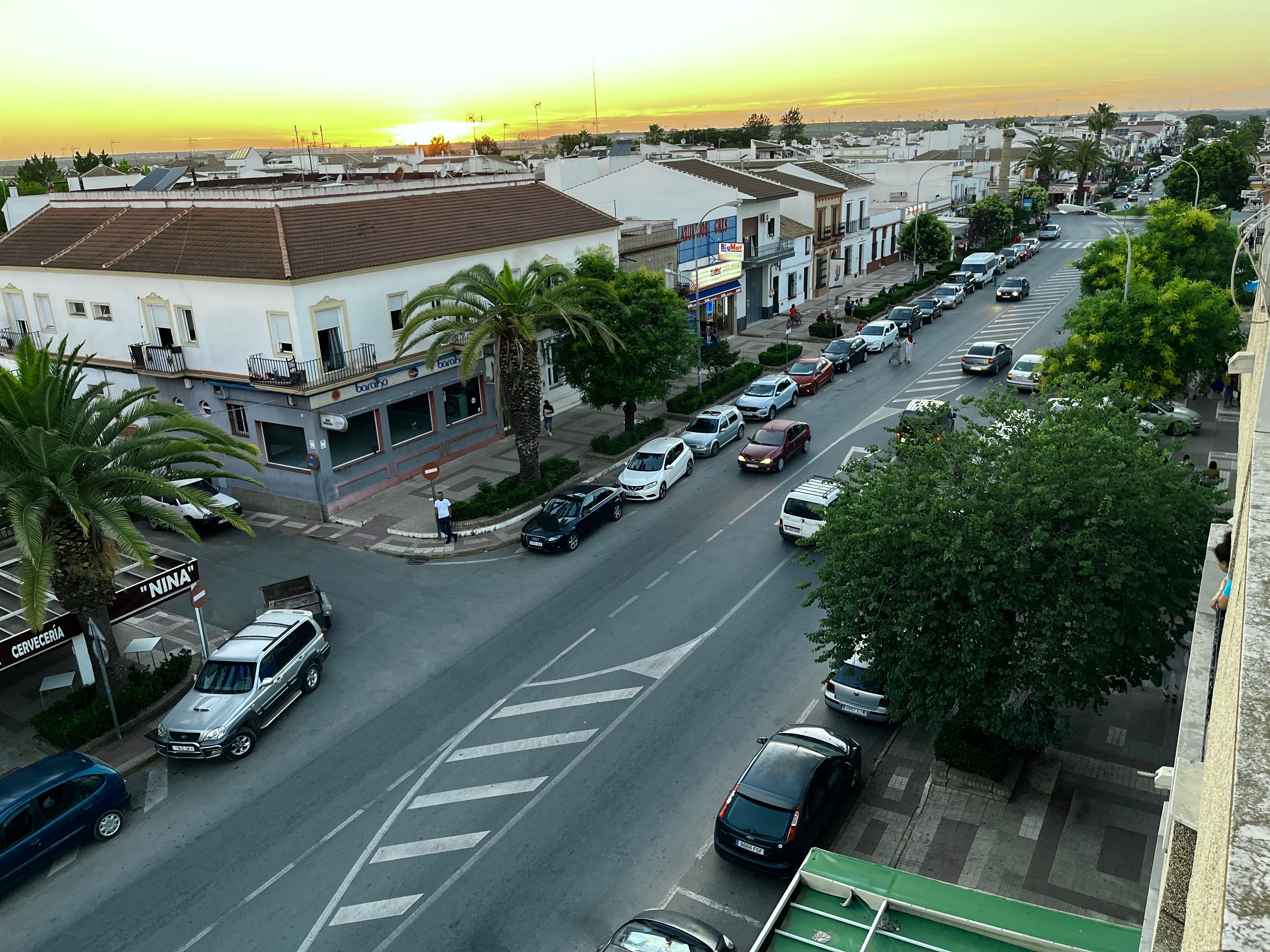
Almonte is the province of Huelva's third largest municipality by population.

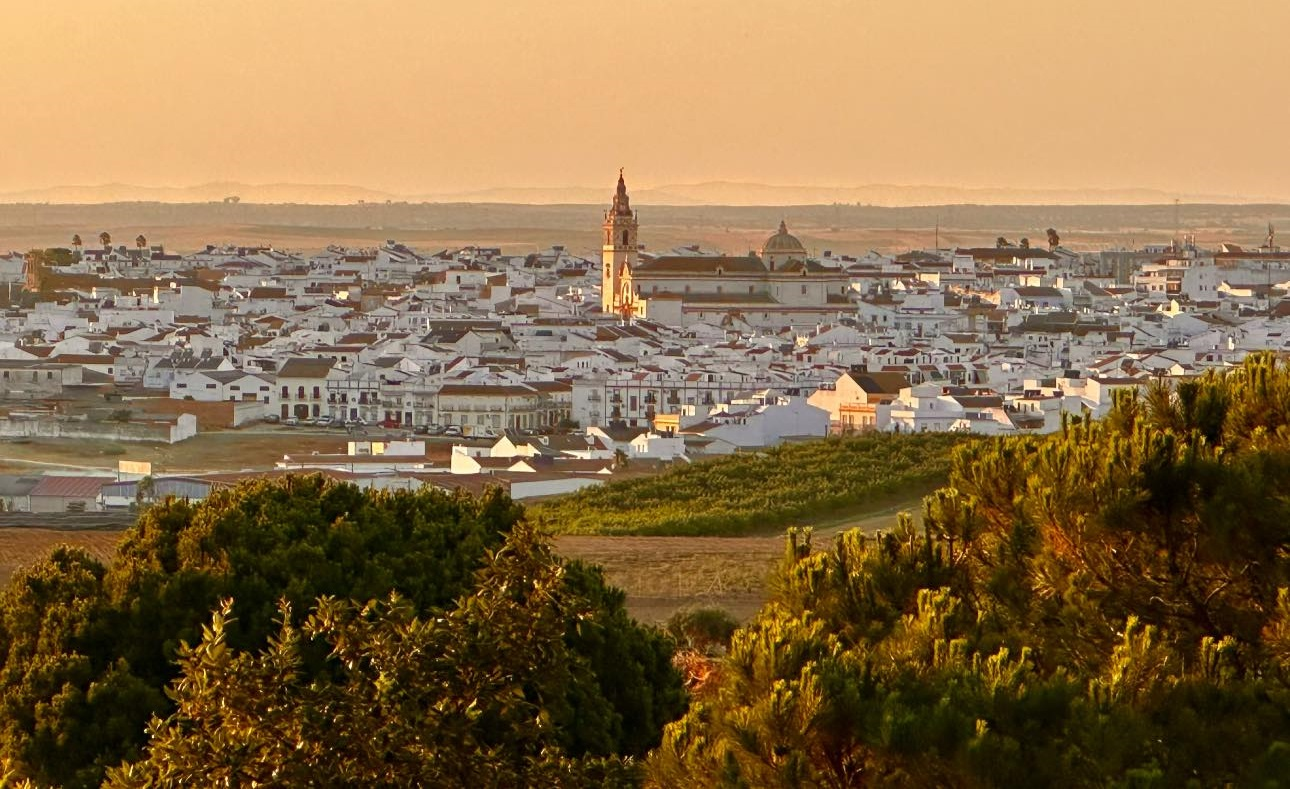
Moguer, the province of Huelva's fourth largest municipality by population

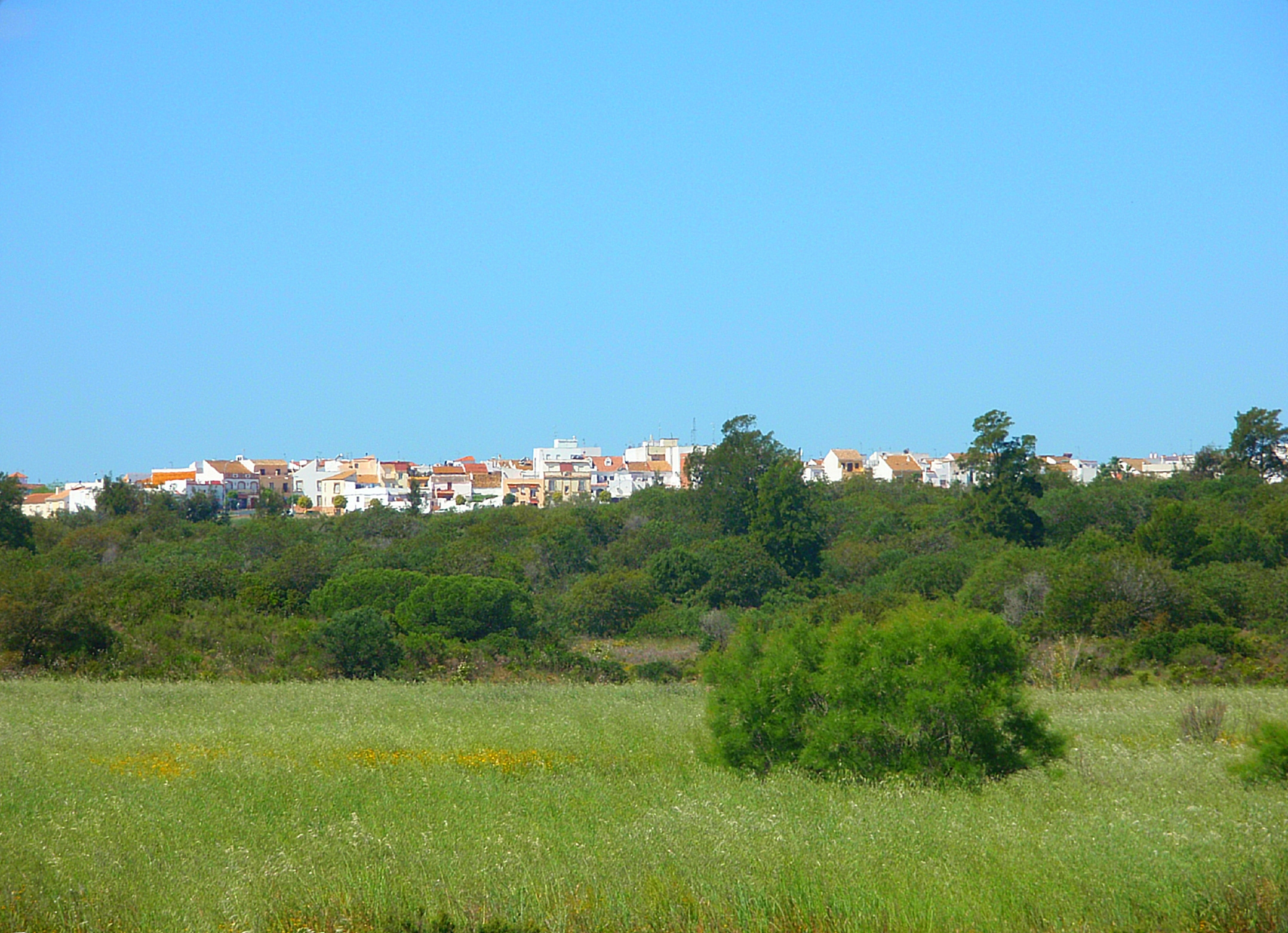
Aljaraque, the fifth largest municipality by population in the province of Huelva

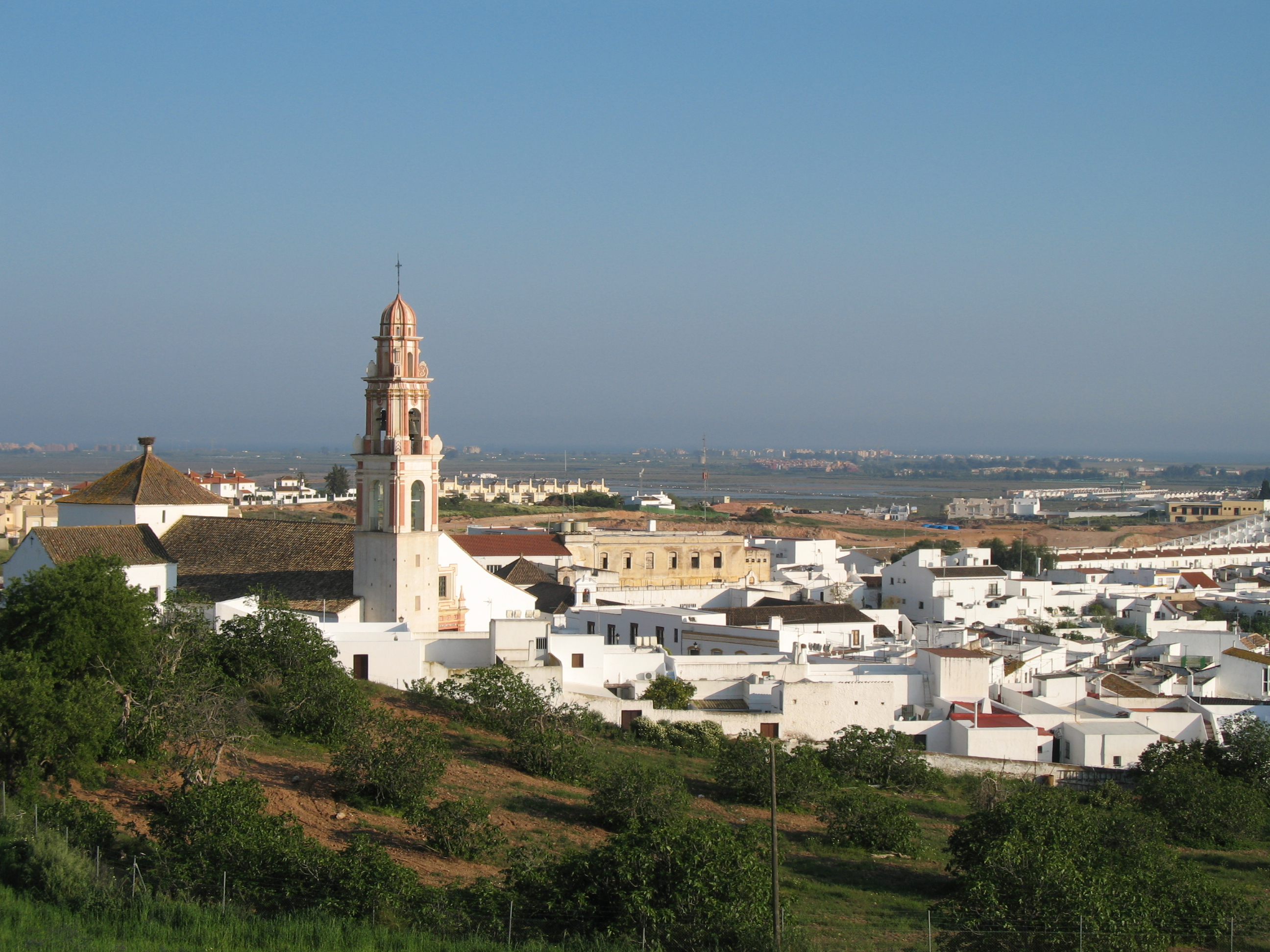
Ayamonte is the province of Huelva's sixth largest municipality by population.

† Provincial capital

Municipalities in the province of Huelva
Name	Population (2024 census)	Population (2011 census)	Population change	Land area (km²)	Population density (2024)
Alájar	792	795	−0.4%	41.46	19.1/km^{2}
Aljaraque	22,505	19,468	+15.6%	33.82	665.4/km^{2}
El Almendro	857	854	+0.4%	170.24	5.0/km^{2}
Almonaster la Real	1,753	1,827	−4.1%	321.29	5.5/km^{2}
Almonte	25,327	22,243	+13.9%	859.65	29.5/km^{2}
Alosno	4,011	4,247	−5.6%	191.07	21.0/km^{2}
Aracena	8,427	7,821	+7.7%	184.45	45.7/km^{2}
Aroche	2,995	3,251	−7.9%	498.13	6.0/km^{2}
Arroyomolinos de León	924	1,041	−11.2%	86.95	10.6/km^{2}
Ayamonte	22,007	20,540	+7.1%	141.57	155.4/km^{2}
Beas	4,388	4,376	+0.3%	144.66	30.3/km^{2}
Berrocal	288	344	−16.3%	126.23	2.3/km^{2}
Bollullos Par del Condado	14,433	14,125	+2.2%	49.53	291.4/km^{2}
Bonares	6,193	6,165	+0.5%	64.64	95.8/km^{2}
Cabezas Rubias	712	827	−13.9%	108.65	6.6/km^{2}
Cala	1,118	1,298	−13.9%	83.94	13.3/km^{2}
Calañas	2,757	4,145	−33.5%	237.83	11.6/km^{2}
El Campillo	2,019	2,185	−7.6%	90.72	22.3/km^{2}
Campofrío	727	798	−8.9%	46.98	15.5/km^{2}
Cañaveral de León	382	461	−17.1%	34.77	11.0/km^{2}
Cartaya	21,423	18,775	+14.1%	224.92	95.2/km^{2}
Castaño del Robledo	226	213	+6.1%	12.93	17.5/km^{2}
El Cerro de Andévalo	2,267	2,426	−6.6%	286.12	7.9/km^{2}
Chucena	2,317	2,213	+4.7%	26.05	88.9/km^{2}
Corteconcepción	576	600	−4.0%	49.13	11.7/km^{2}
Cortegana	4,626	4,842	−4.5%	173.06	26.7/km^{2}
Cortelazor	313	293	+6.8%	39.93	7.8/km^{2}
Cumbres de Enmedio	61	69	−11.6%	13.55	4.5/km^{2}
Cumbres de San Bartolomé	359	442	−18.8%	144.58	2.5/km^{2}
Cumbres Mayores	1,732	1,902	−8.9%	121.61	14.2/km^{2}
Encinasola	1,294	1,481	−12.6%	177.68	7.3/km^{2}
Escacena del Campo	2,315	2,183	+6.0%	134.90	17.2/km^{2}
Fuenteheridos	819	573	+42.9%	10.92	75.0/km^{2}
Galaroza	1,376	1,565	−12.1%	22.27	61.8/km^{2}
Gibraleón	13,306	12,605	+5.6%	328.33	40.5/km^{2}
La Granada de Río-Tinto	244	240	+1.7%	44.70	5.5/km^{2}
El Granado	494	570	−13.3%	97.70	5.1/km^{2}
Higuera de la Sierra	1,299	1,391	−6.6%	24.48	53.1/km^{2}
Hinojales	326	355	−8.2%	26.71	12.2/km^{2}
Hinojos	4,111	3,919	+4.9%	319.88	12.9/km^{2}
Huelva†	143,526	147,808	−2.9%	151.63	946.6/km^{2}
Isla Cristina	21,664	21,844	−0.8%	49.36	438.9/km^{2}
Jabugo	2,199	2,329	−5.6%	24.92	88.2/km^{2}
Lepe	29,382	26,538	+10.7%	127.94	229.7/km^{2}
Linares de la Sierra	275	294	−6.5%	29.22	9.4/km^{2}
Lucena del Puerto	3,429	3,126	+9.7%	69.73	49.2/km^{2}
Manzanilla	2,231	2,362	−5.5%	39.64	56.3/km^{2}
Los Marines	427	360	+18.6%	9.98	42.8/km^{2}
Minas de Riotinto	3,709	4,126	−10.1%	23.31	159.1/km^{2}
Moguer	23,371	20,668	+13.1%	203.74	114.7/km^{2}
La Nava	258	315	−18.1%	61.03	4.2/km^{2}
Nerva	5,068	5,755	−11.9%	55.40	91.5/km^{2}
Niebla	4,307	4,167	+3.4%	223.72	19.3/km^{2}
La Palma del Condado	10,710	10,580	+1.2%	60.38	177.4/km^{2}
Palos de la Frontera	12,900	9,614	+34.2%	49.25	261.9/km^{2}
Paterna del Campo	3,428	3,632	−5.6%	132.53	25.9/km^{2}
Paymogo	1,187	1,297	−8.5%	213.48	5.6/km^{2}
Puebla de Guzmán	3,131	3,080	+1.7%	336.37	9.3/km^{2}
Puerto Moral	280	276	+1.4%	19.82	14.1/km^{2}
Punta Umbría	16,092	15,016	+7.2%	38.74	415.4/km^{2}
Rociana del Condado	8,025	7,518	+6.7%	71.85	111.7/km^{2}
Rosal de la Frontera	1,695	1,867	−9.2%	209.22	8.1/km^{2}
San Bartolomé de la Torre	3,999	3,570	+12.0%	56.61	70.6/km^{2}
San Juan del Puerto	9,826	8,500	+15.6%	45.28	217.0/km^{2}
Sanlúcar de Guadiana	419	402	+4.2%	96.33	4.3/km^{2}
San Silvestre de Guzmán	642	704	−8.8%	48.87	13.1/km^{2}
Santa Ana la Real	476	540	−11.9%	26.57	17.9/km^{2}
Santa Bárbara de Casa	1,149	1,172	−2.0%	146.58	7.8/km^{2}
Santa Olalla del Cala	2,061	2,169	−5.0%	202.92	10.2/km^{2}
Trigueros	8,131	7,821	+4.0%	117.98	68.9/km^{2}
Valdelarco	236	239	−1.3%	14.87	15.9/km^{2}
Valverde del Camino	12,704	12,777	−0.6%	218.67	58.1/km^{2}
Villablanca	2,999	2,878	+4.2%	98.31	30.5/km^{2}
Villalba del Alcor	3,310	3,449	−4.0%	62.41	53.0/km^{2}
Villanueva de las Cruces	379	411	−7.8%	34.39	11.0/km^{2}
Villanueva de los Castillejos	2,962	2,750	+7.7%	263.98	11.2/km^{2}
Villarrasa	2,144	2,190	−2.1%	72.19	29.7/km^{2}
Zalamea la Real	2,977	3,359	−11.4%	238.85	12.5/km^{2}
La Zarza-Perrunal	1,191	No data (Note: La Zarza-Perrunal became an independent municipality in 2018 as both La Zarza and Perrunal were partitioned from Calañas and is thus not included in the 2011 census.)		44.62	26.7/km^{2}
Zufre	736	923	−20.3%	340.70	2.2/km^{2}
Province of Huelva	535,734	519,895	+3.0%	10,127.43	52.9/km^{2}
Andalusia	8,631,862	8,371,270	+3.1%	87,587.59	98.6/km^{2}
Spain	48,619,695	46,815,916	+3.9%	504,755.17	96.3/km^{2}

== See also ==
- Geography of Spain
- List of municipalities of Spain
