= Paterna del Campo =

- Municipality
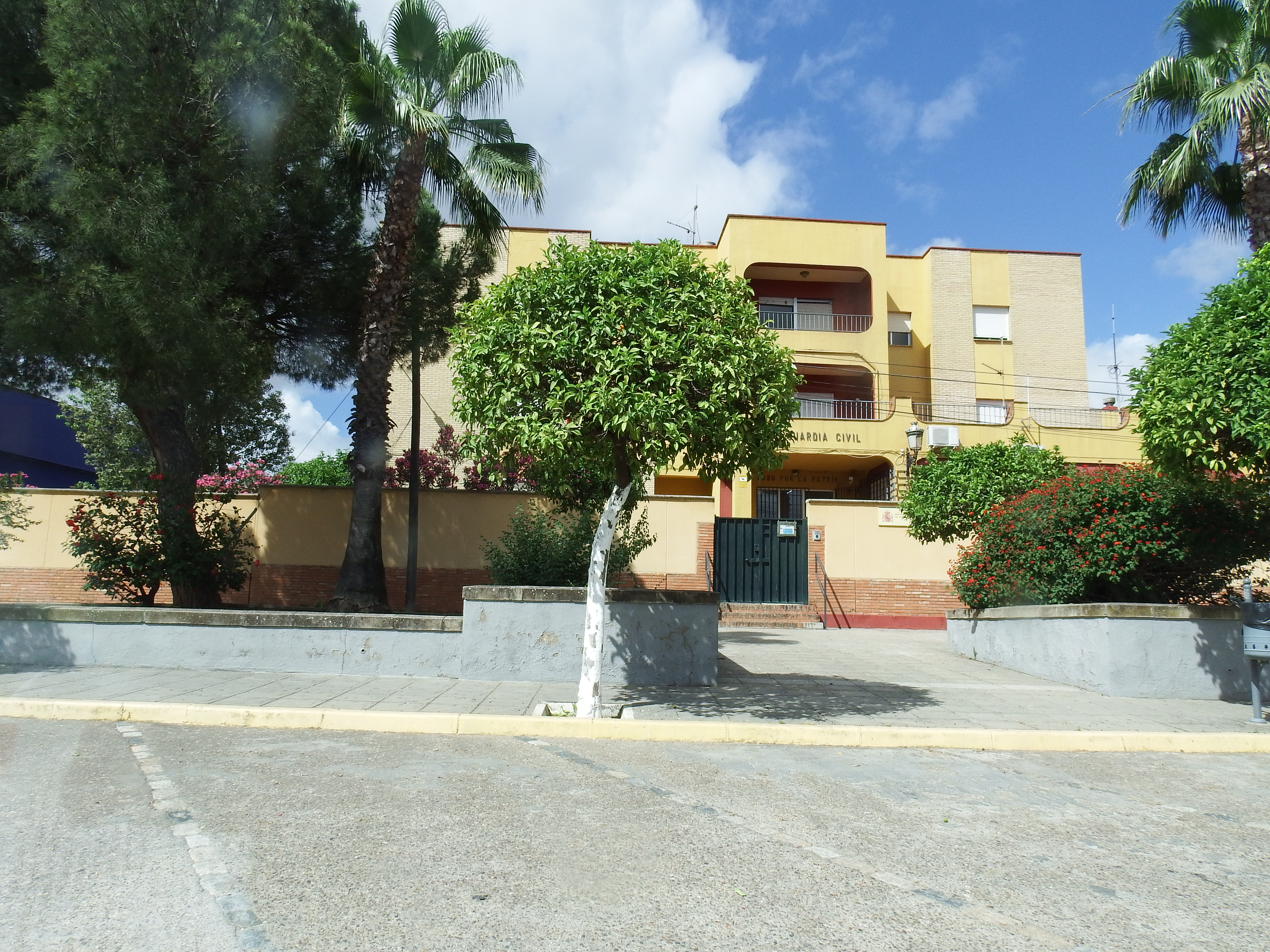

- Flag Coat of arms

- Location in Spain
- Coordinates: 37°25′N 6°24′W
- Country: Spain
- Autonomous community: Andalusia
- Province: Huelva
- Comarca: Condado

Government
  - Alcalde: Emilio Vergara Camacho (PSOE)

Area
  - Total: 132 km^{2} (51 sq mi)
- Elevation: 186 m (610 ft)

Population (2025-01-01)
  - Total: 3,382
  - Density: 25.6/km^{2} (66.4/sq mi)
- Demonym: Paternino
- Time zone: UTC+1 (CET)
  - Summer (DST): UTC+2 (CEST)
- Postal code: 21880
- Official language(s): Spanish
- Website: Official website

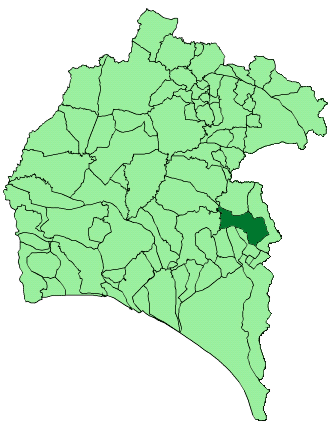
Map of Paterna del Campo, Huelva

Paterna del Campo is a town and municipality located in the province of Huelva, Spain. According to the 2025 municipal register, it has a population of 3,382 inhabitants.

== See also ==
- List of municipalities in Huelva
