= Bonares =

Bonares, Spain
- Flag Coat of arms

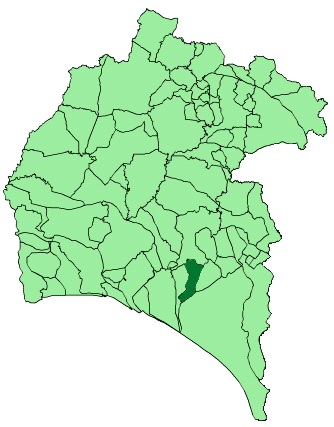
- Location of Bonares
- Coordinates: 37°19′N 6°40′W
- Municipality: Huelva

Government
  - Mayor: Juan Antonio García García

Area
  - Total: 66 km^{2} (25 sq mi)
  - Land: 66 km^{2} (25 sq mi)
  - Water: 0.00 km^{2} (0 sq mi)

Population (2025-01-01)
  - Total: 6,125
  - Density: 93/km^{2} (240/sq mi)
- Time zone: UTC+1 (CET)
  - Summer (DST): UTC+2 (CEST)

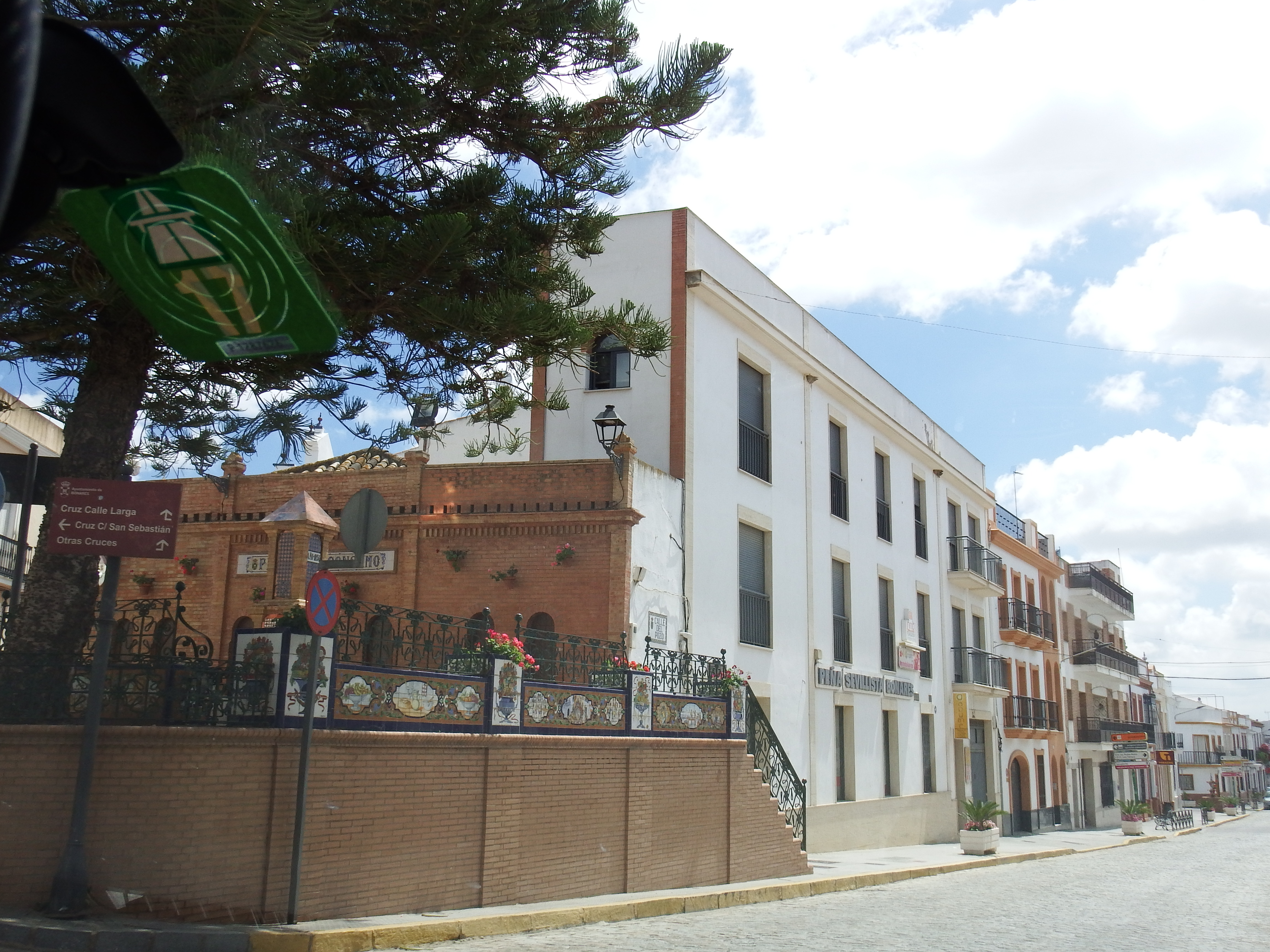
Bonares

Bonares is a town and municipality located in the province of Huelva, Spain. According to the 2025 municipal register, the city has a population of 6,125 inhabitants.

== Demographics ==
Historical population
Year	Pop.	±%
1999	5,063	—
2000	5,122	+1.2%
2001	5,233	+2.2%
2002	5,271	+0.7%
2003	5,295	+0.5%
2004	5,267	−0.5%
2005	5,310	+0.8%
2006	5,493	+3.4%
2007	5,602	+2.0%
2008	5,762	+2.9%
2009	6,015	+4.4%
2010	6,145	+2.2%
2011	6,189	+0.7%
2012	6,194	+0.1%
2013	6,282	+1.4%
Source: INE (Spain)

== See also ==
- List of municipalities in Huelva
