= El Campillo, Huelva =

Coordinates: 37.683°N 6.617°W

El Campillo
- Municipality
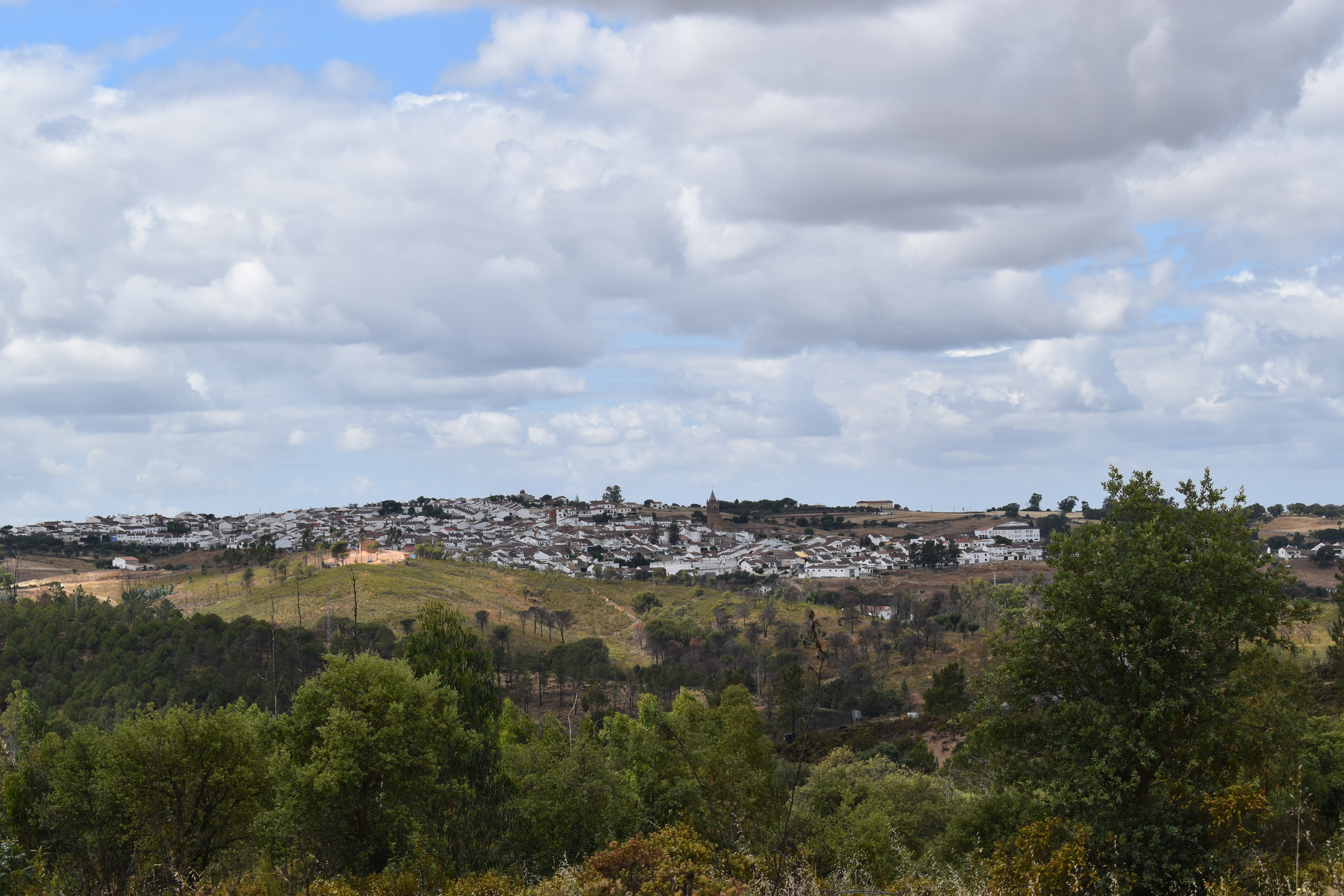

- Flag Coat of arms

- Location in Spain.
- Country: Spain
- Autonomous community: Andalusia
- Province: Huelva

Area
  - Total: 90.72 km^{2} (35.03 sq mi)
- Elevation: 434 m (1,424 ft)

Population (2025-01-01)
  - Total: 2,003
  - Density: 22.08/km^{2} (57.18/sq mi)
- Time zone: UTC+1 (CET)
  - Summer (DST): UTC+2 (CEST)

El Campillo, or Campillo, is a municipality of Spain located in the province of Huelva, autonomous community of Andalusia. The municipality spans across a total area of 90.72 km^{2} and, as of 1 January 2023, it has a registered population of 2,015.

Previously a hamlet belonging to the municipality of Zalamea la Real, El Campillo became a standalone municipality in 1931.

== Demographics ==
Historical population
Year	Pop.	±%
1999	2,424	—
2000	2,430	+0.2%
2001	2,402	−1.2%
2002	2,398	−0.2%
2003	2,335	−2.6%
2004	2,293	−1.8%
2005	2,318	+1.1%
Source: INE (Spain)

== Notable people ==
- Fermín López (born 2003), footballer who plays for FC Barcelona.

== See also ==
- List of municipalities in Huelva
