= Puerto Moral =

Coordinates: 37°53′N 6°28′W

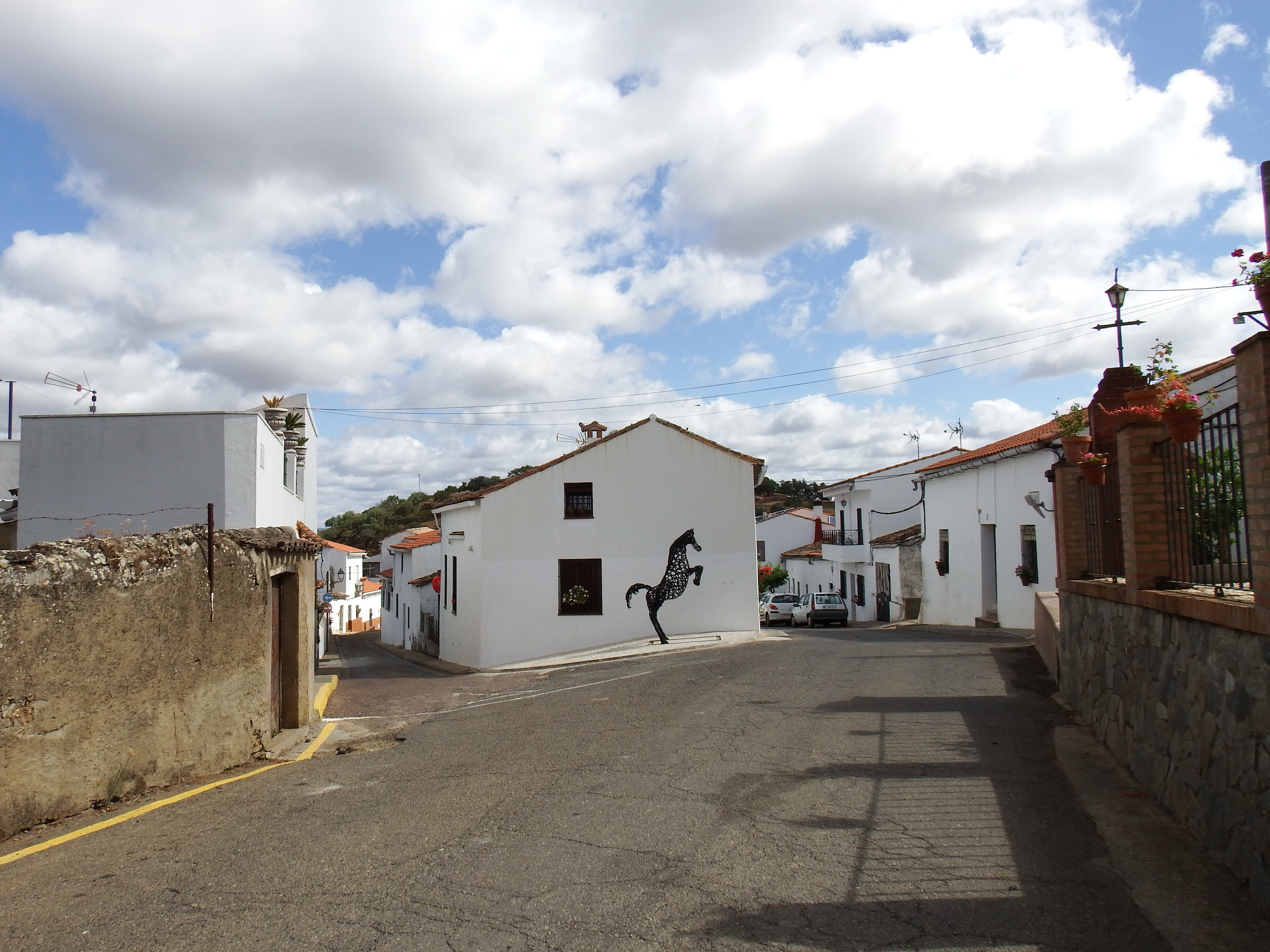

- Flag Coat of arms

- Location in Spain.
- Country: Spain
- Autonomous community: Andalusia
- Province: Huelva

Area
  - Total: 20 km^{2} (7.7 sq mi)
- Elevation: 518 m (1,699 ft)

Population (2025-01-01)
  - Total: 276
  - Density: 14/km^{2} (36/sq mi)
- Time zone: UTC+1 (CET)
  - Summer (DST): UTC+2 (CEST)

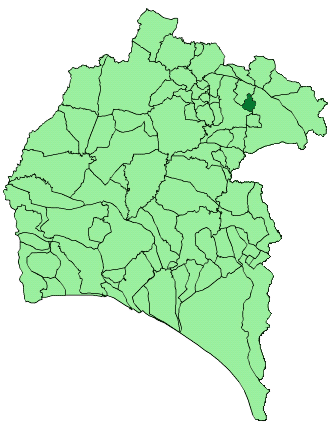
Map of Puerto Moral, Huelva

Puerto Moral is a town and municipality located in the province of Huelva, Spain. According to the 2025 municipal register, the municipality had a population of 276 inhabitants.

== See also ==
- List of municipalities in Huelva
