= Berrocal =

- Flag Coat of arms

- Location in Andalusia Location in Spain
- Country: Spain
- Autonomous community: Andalusia
- Province: Huelva
- Comarca: Cuenca Minera de Huelva

Government
  - Mayor: Juan Jesus Bermejo Delgado

Area
  - Total: 126 km^{2} (49 sq mi)

Population (2025-01-01)
  - Total: 283
  - Density: 2.25/km^{2} (5.82/sq mi)
- Time zone: UTC+1 (CET)
  - Summer (DST): UTC+2 (CEST)
- Website: Official website

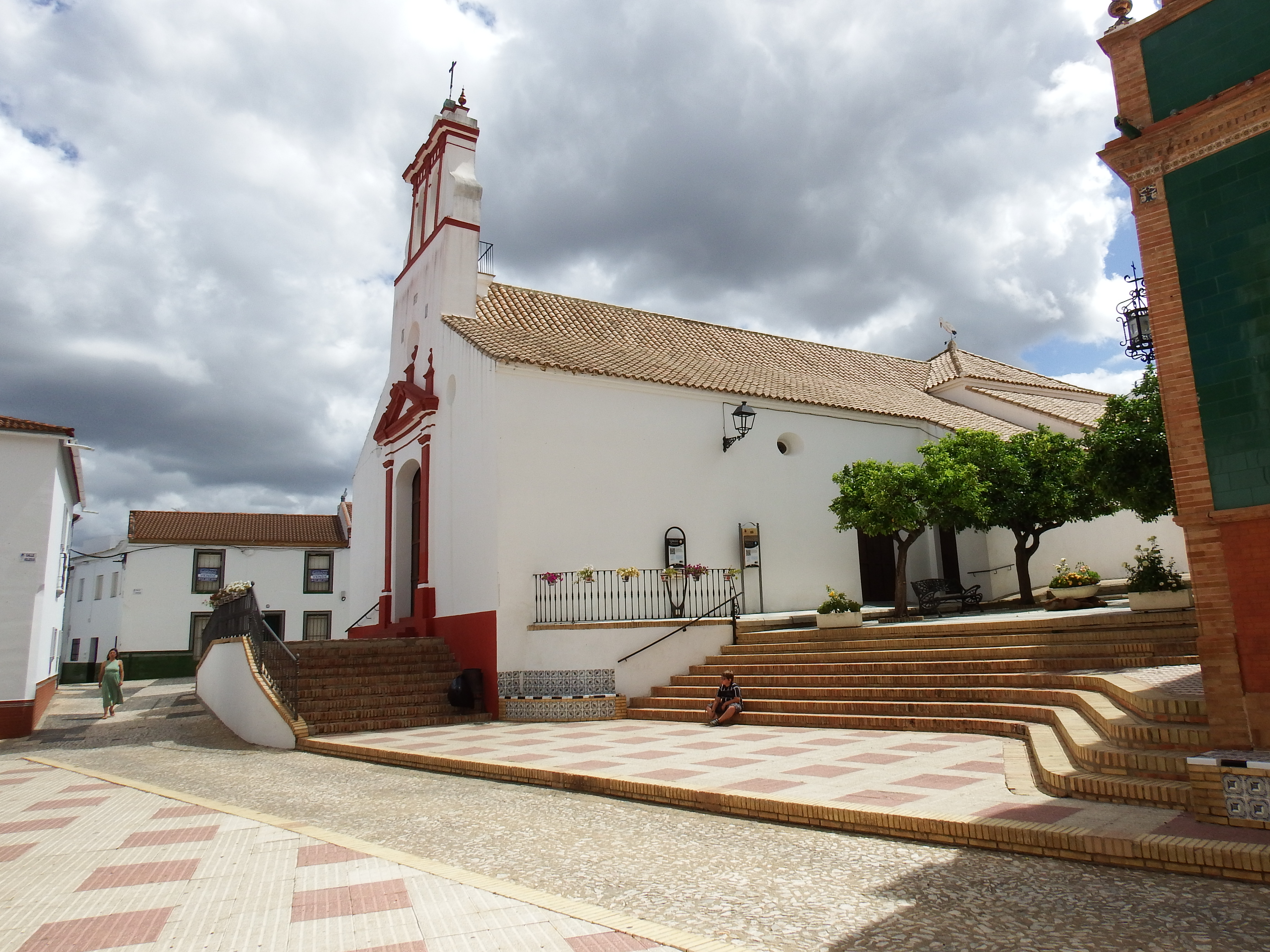

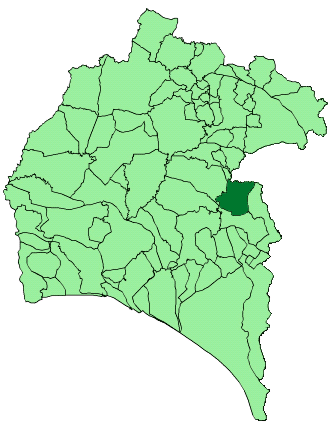
Map of Berrocal, Huelva

Berrocal is a city located in the province of Huelva, Spain. According to the 2025 municipal register, the city has a population of 283 inhabitants.

== Demographics ==
Historical population
Year	Pop.	±%
1999	412	—
2000	409	−0.7%
2001	394	−3.7%
2002	378	−4.1%
2003	374	−1.1%
2004	371	−0.8%
2005	371	+0.0%
Source: INE (Spain)

== See also ==
- List of municipalities in Huelva
