= Zufre =

Coordinates: 37°50′N 6°20′W

- Flag Coat of arms

- Location in Spain.
- Country: Spain
- Autonomous community: Andalusia
- Province: Huelva

Area
  - Total: 341 km^{2} (132 sq mi)
- Elevation: 450 m (1,480 ft)

Population (2025-01-01)
  - Total: 736
  - Density: 2.16/km^{2} (5.59/sq mi)
- Time zone: UTC+1 (CET)
  - Summer (DST): UTC+2 (CEST)

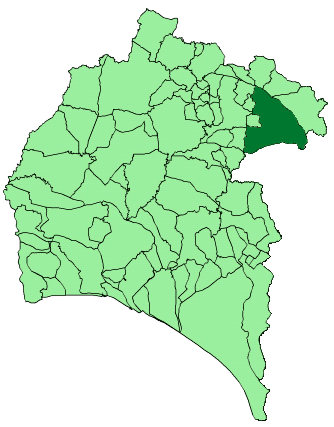
Map of Zufre, Huelva

Zufre is a town and municipality located in the province of Huelva, Spain.

== See also ==
- List of municipalities in Huelva
