= Higuera de la Sierra =

- Municipality
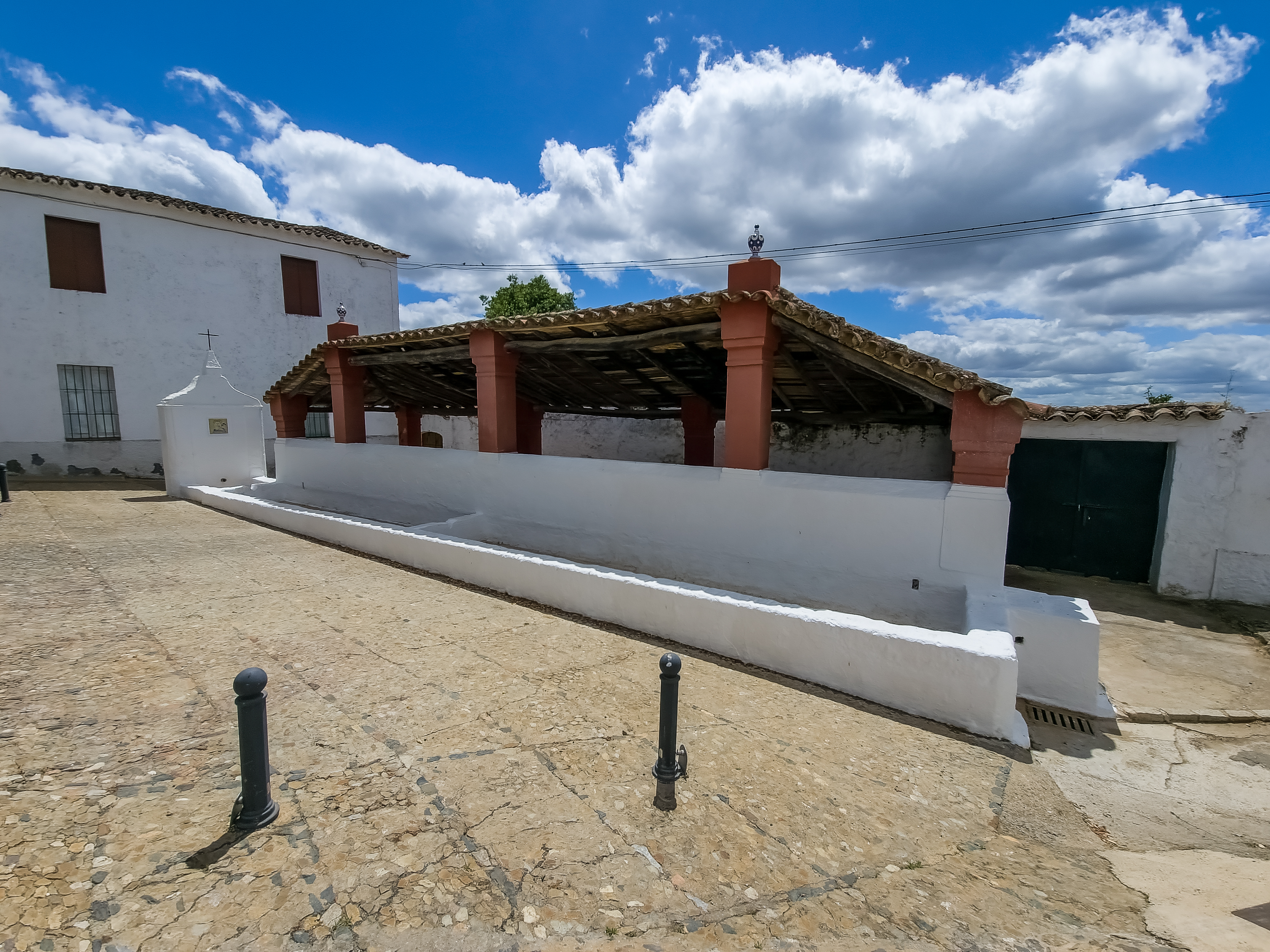

- Flag Coat of arms

- Location in Spain
- Coordinates: 37°50′N 6°26′W
- Country: Spain
- Autonomous community: Andalusia
- Province: Huelva
- Comarca: Sierra de Huelva

Area
  - Total: 24 km^{2} (9.3 sq mi)
- Elevation: 620 m (2,030 ft)

Population (2025-01-01)
  - Total: 1,292
  - Density: 54/km^{2} (140/sq mi)
- Demonym: Higuereños
- Time zone: UTC+1 (CET)
  - Summer (DST): UTC+2 (CEST)
- Postal code: 21220
- Website: Official website

Higuera de la Sierra is a town and municipality located in the province of Huelva, Spain. According to the 2025 municipal register, it has a population of 1,292 inhabitants.

== See also ==
- List of municipalities in Huelva
