= Cala, Spain =

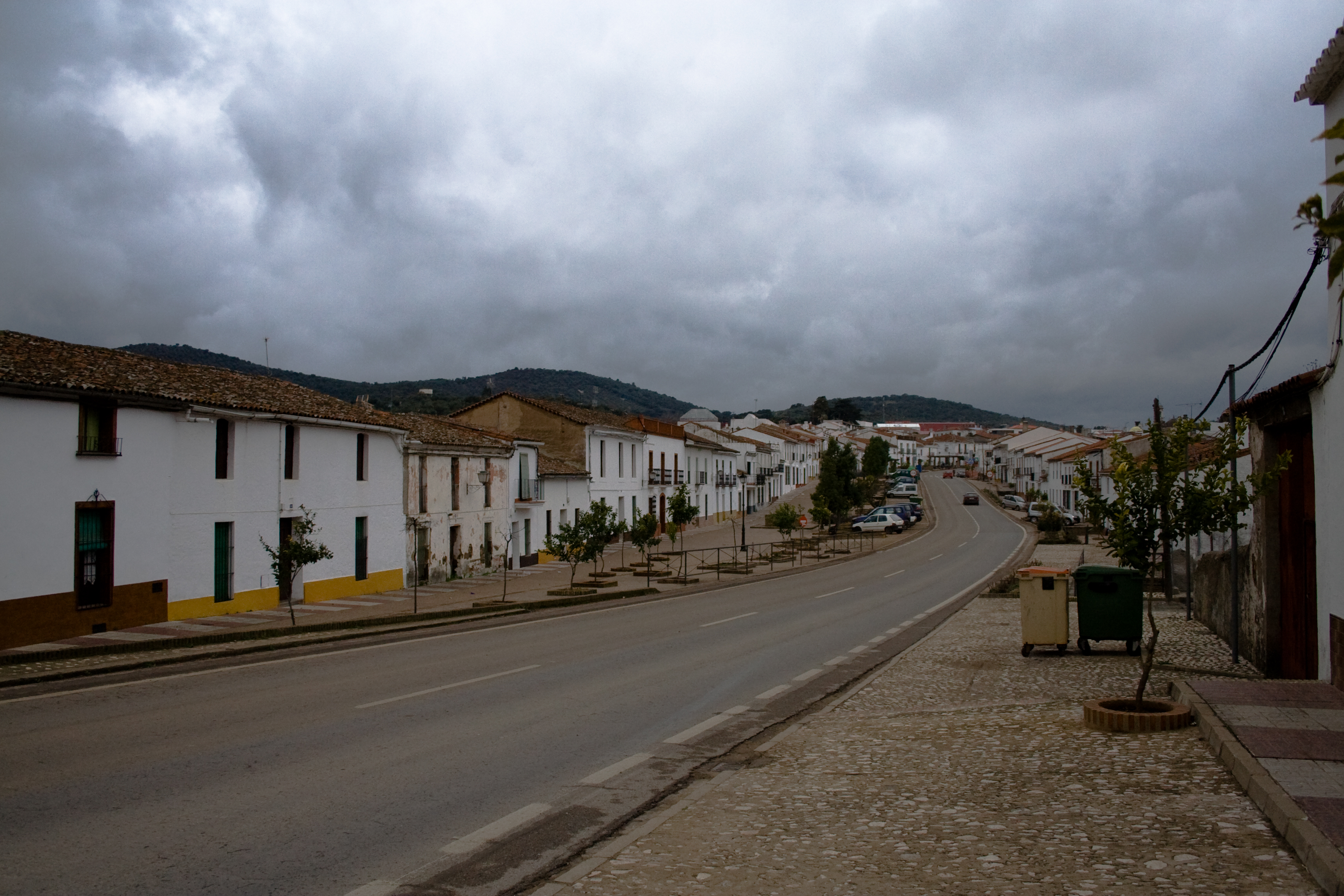

- Flag Coat of arms

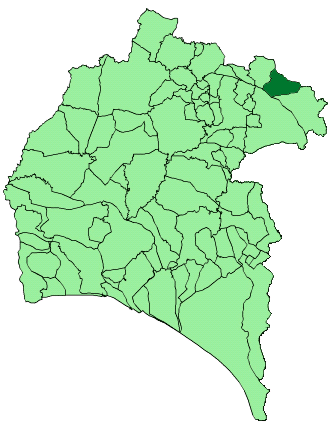
- Location of Cala
- Coordinates: 37°58′N 6°19′W
- Municipality: Huelva

Government
  - Mayor: Gregorio Ortega Sánchez

Area
  - Total: 84 km^{2} (32 sq mi)
  - Land: 84 km^{2} (32 sq mi)
  - Water: 0.00 km^{2} (0 sq mi)

Population (2025-01-01)
  - Total: 1,106
  - Density: 13/km^{2} (34/sq mi)
- Time zone: UTC+1 (CET)
  - Summer (DST): UTC+2 (CEST)

Cala is a town and municipality located in the province of Huelva, Spain. According to the 2025 municipal register, the city has a population of 1,106 inhabitants.

The region has been mined since Carthaginian times and the local mines, Minas de Cala are well known for the minerals Skutterudite and Nickeline.

== Demographics ==
Historical population
Year	Pop.	±%
1999	1,457	—
2000	1,414	−3.0%
2001	1,404	−0.7%
2002	1,356	−3.4%
2003	1,344	−0.9%
2004	1,315	−2.2%
2005	1,324	+0.7%
Source: INE (Spain)

== See also ==
- List of municipalities in Huelva
