= Valdelarco =

Coordinates: 37°57′N 6°41′W

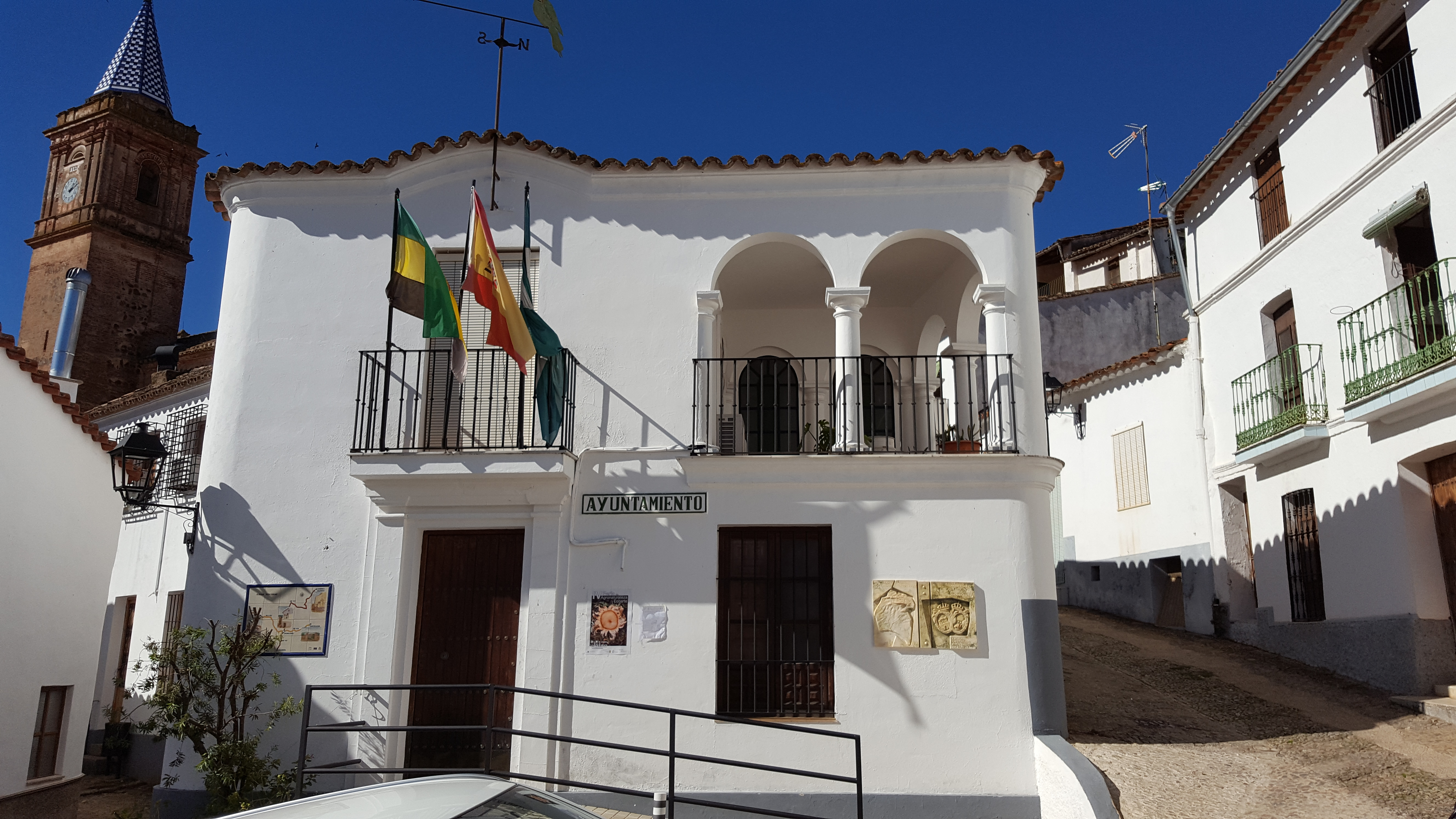
- Town hall of Valdelarco

- Flag Coat of arms

- Location in Spain
- Municipality: Huelva

Population (2025-01-01)
  - Total: 239
- Time zone: UTC+1 (CET)
  - Summer (DST): UTC+2 (CEST)

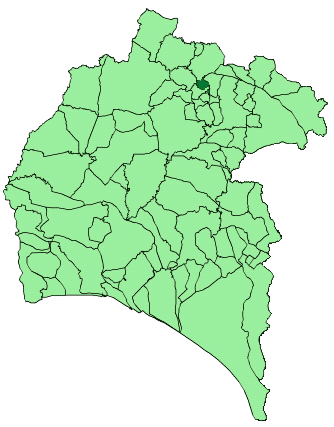
Map of Valdelarco, Huelva

Valdelarco is a town and municipality in the province of Huelva, located in the autonomous community of Andalusia, Southern Spain. According to the 2008 census, it had a population of 240 inhabitants.

== See also ==
- List of municipalities in Huelva
