= La Granada de Riotinto =

Coordinates: 37°46′N 6°30′W

La Granada de Río-Tinto
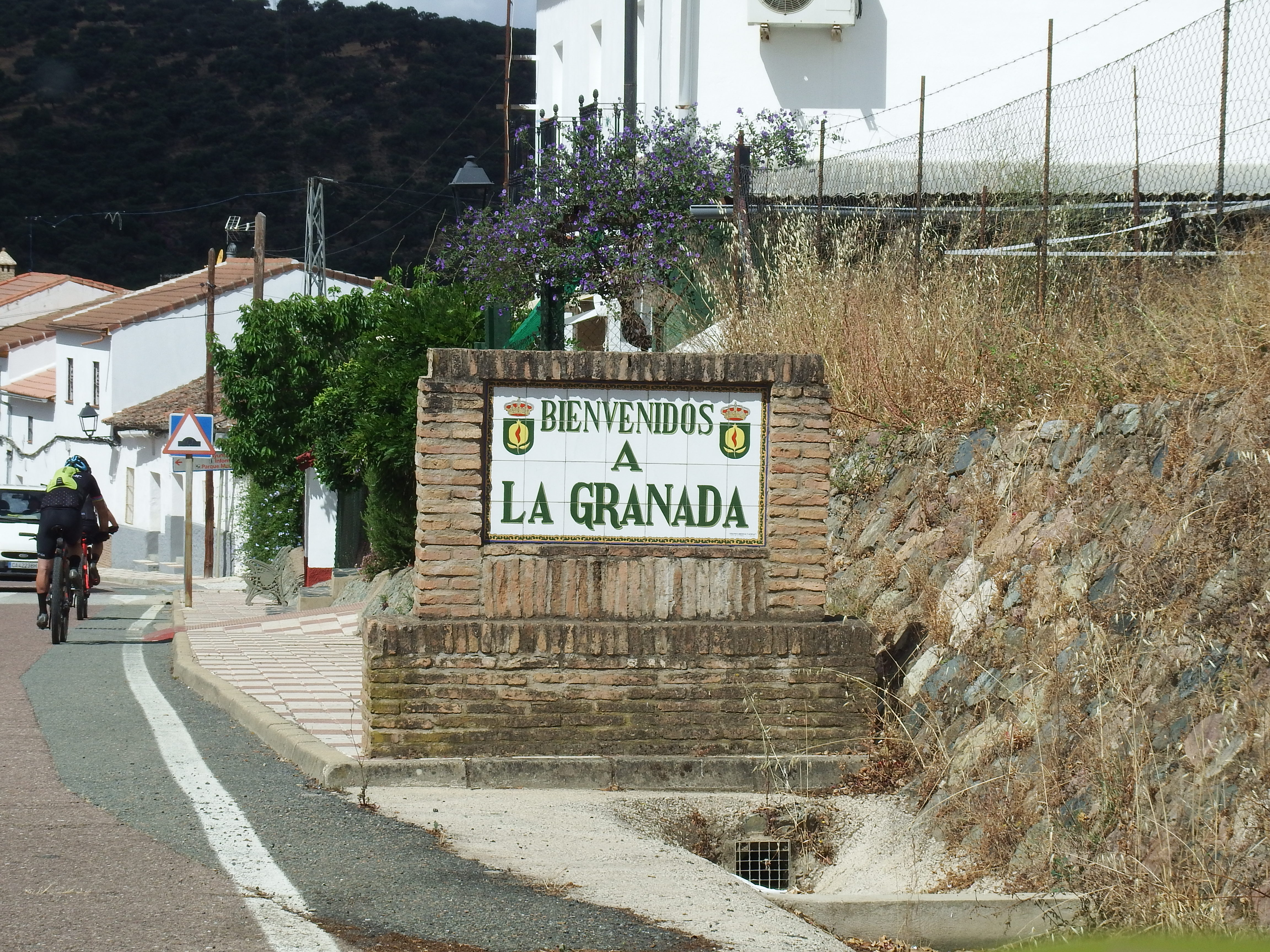

- Flag Coat of arms

- Location in Spain.
- Country: Spain
- Autonomous community: Andalusia
- Province: Huelva

Area
  - Total: 44 km^{2} (17 sq mi)
- Elevation: 437 m (1,434 ft)

Population (2025-01-01)
  - Total: 235
  - Density: 5.3/km^{2} (14/sq mi)
- Time zone: UTC+1 (CET)
  - Summer (DST): UTC+2 (CEST)

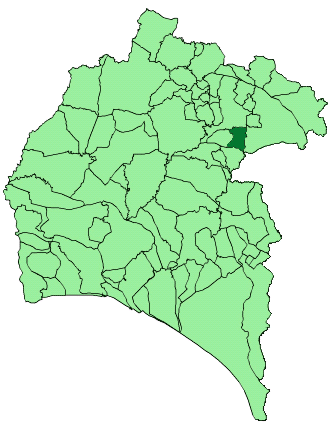
Map of La Granada de Río-Tinto, Huelva

La Granada de Río-Tinto is a town and municipality located in the province of Huelva, Spain. According to the 2025 municipal register, the municipality had a population of 235 inhabitants.

== See also ==
- List of municipalities in Huelva
