= Cañaveral de León =

Municipality in Spain

Coordinates: 38°01′N 6°31′W

Cañaveral
- Municipality
- Concello de Cañaveral de León
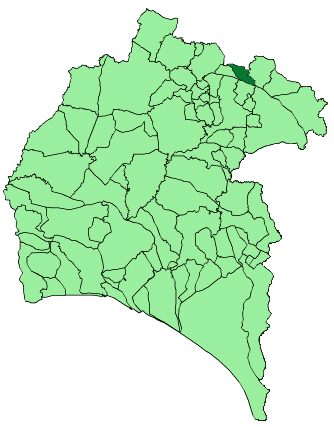
- Map of Cañaveral de León, Huelva

- Flag Seal
- Interactive map of Cañaveral
- Country: Spain
- Autonomous community: Andalusia
- Province: Huelva

Area
  - Total: 35 km^{2} (14 sq mi)
- Elevation: 533 m (1,749 ft)

Population (2005)
  - Total: ▼419
  - Density: 12/km^{2} (31/sq mi)
- Time zone: UTC+1 (CET)
  - Summer (DST): UTC+2 (CEST)

Cañaveral de León is a town and municipality located in the province of Huelva, Spain. According to the 2005 census, it has a population of 419 inhabitants and covers a 35 km^{2} area (12.0 people/km^{2}). It sits at an altitude of 533 m above sea level, and is 134 km from the capital.

== Etymology ==
Its name comes from its dependence on the Encomienda de León, and probably of the reeds that should exist at the foot of a large spring water that emerges at the center of the village and that has marked Cañaveral, beyond its name and also its shape and its history. In Spanish, cañaveral means "a place where reeds (caña) grow.

== History ==
Cañaveral de León is part of a group of four sister villages, the three other ones, located in the Badajoz Province (Extremadura), being Calera de León, Segura de León and Fuentes de León. These lands were conquered from the Moors in the mid-thirteenth century by the Order of Santiago, All of them once belonged to the Encomienda Mayor de León (Greater Commandery of León), who was in charge of repopulating the area with people from Castilla y León.

The title of villa was granted to Cañaveral de León by King Philip II on 30 December 1588, which allowed the village to secede from Fuentes de León. Until 1833, the village was part of the Badajoz Province. in the next years, Cañaveral de León had a big dispute with the neighbouring village of Hinojales for the ownership of the area known as Umbría de Hinojales; Hinojales eventually won the case in court and Cañaveral de León lost some 4,500 ha of land.

== Demographics ==
Historical population
| Year | Pop. | ±% |
|---|---|---|
| 1999 | 515 | — |
| 2000 | 501 | −2.7% |
| 2001 | 489 | −2.4% |
| 2002 | 474 | −3.1% |
| 2003 | 464 | −2.1% |
| 2004 | 434 | −6.5% |
| 2005 | 419 | −3.5% |
Source: INE (Spain)

== See also ==
- List of municipalities in Huelva
