= Santa Ana la Real =

Coordinates: 37°52′N 6°43′W

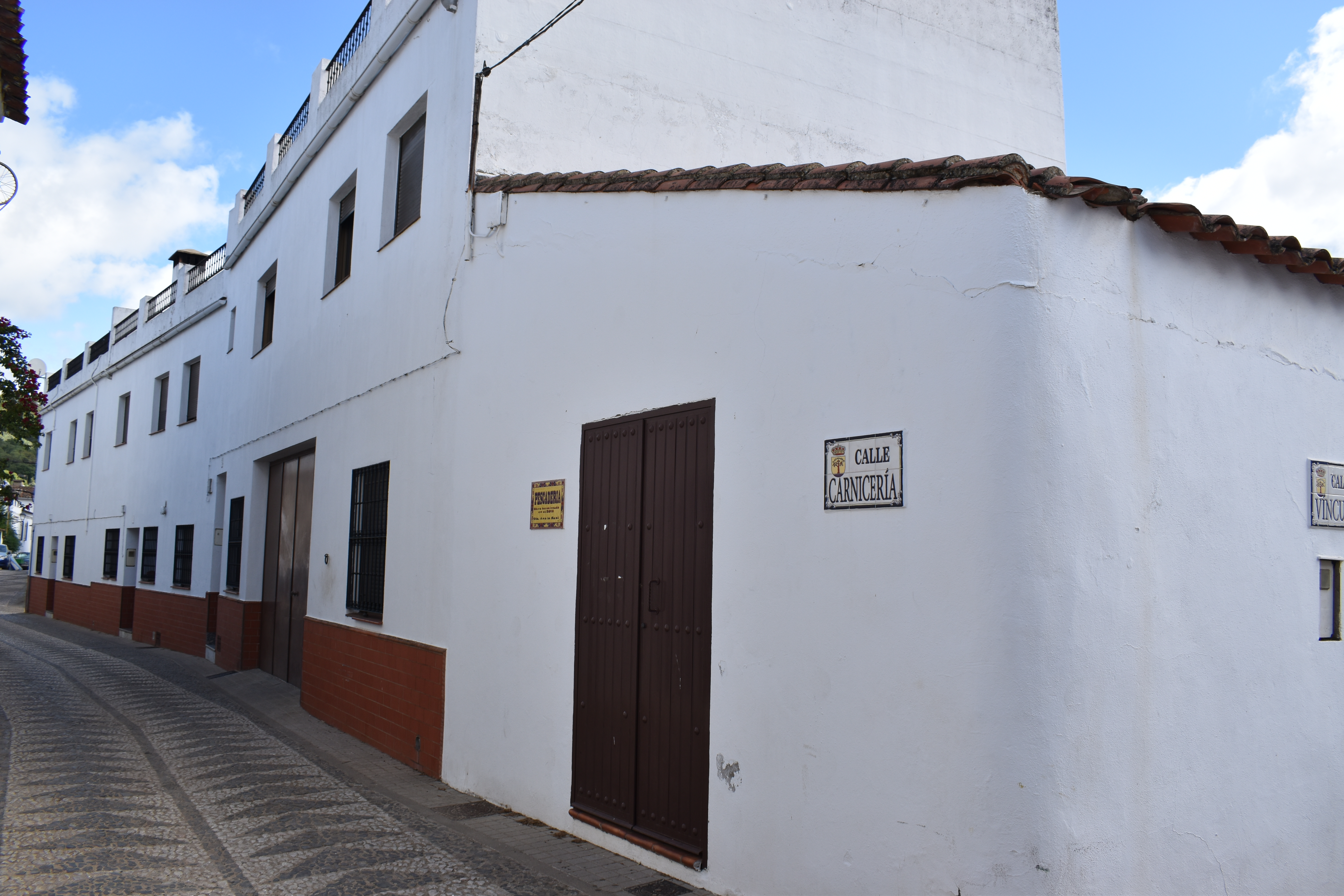

- Flag Coat of arms

- Location in Spain.
- Country: Spain
- Autonomous community: Andalusia
- Province: Huelva

Area
  - Total: 27 km^{2} (10 sq mi)
- Elevation: 641 m (2,103 ft)

Population (2025-01-01)
  - Total: 466
  - Density: 17/km^{2} (45/sq mi)
- Time zone: UTC+1 (CET)
  - Summer (DST): UTC+2 (CEST)

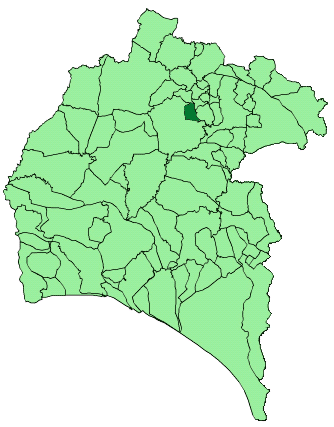
Map of Santa Ana la Real, Huelva

Santa Ana la Real is a town and municipality located in the province of Huelva, Spain. According to the 2008 census, the municipality had a population of 519 inhabitants.

== See also ==
- List of municipalities in Huelva
