= Corteconcepción =

Town and municipality in Huelva, Spain

Coordinates: 37°54′N 6°30′W

Concello de Corteconcepción
- Municipality
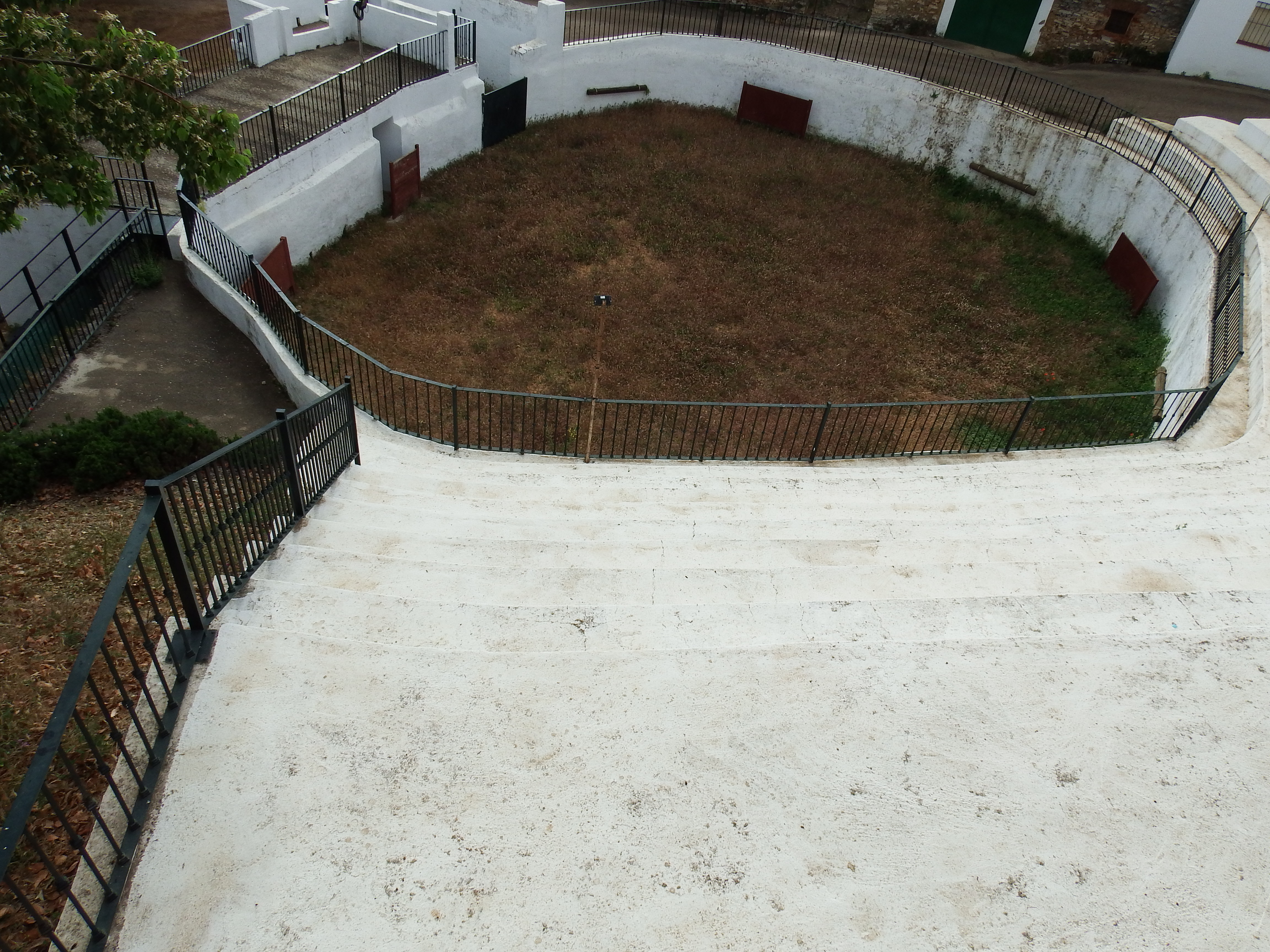

- Flag Coat of arms

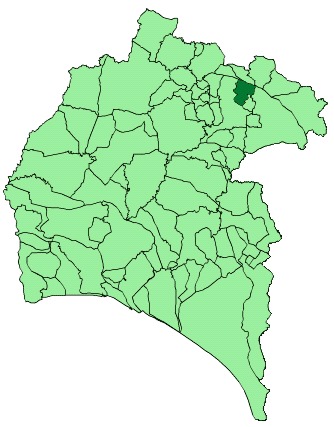
- Country: Spain
- Autonomous community: Andalusia
- Province: Huelva

Area
  - Total: 49 km^{2} (19 sq mi)
- Elevation: 572 m (1,877 ft)

Population (2005)
  - Total: 620
  - Density: 13/km^{2} (33/sq mi)
- Time zone: UTC+1 (CET)
  - Summer (DST): UTC+2 (CEST)

Corteconcepción is a town and municipality located in the province of Huelva, Spain. According to the 2005 census, it has a population of 620 inhabitants and covers a 49 km^{2} (19 sq mi) area( people/km²). It sits at an altitude of 572 m (1,877 ft) above sea level, and is 114 km (71 mi) from the capital.

== See also ==
- List of municipalities in Huelva
