= Cortelazor =

Town in Huelva, Spain

Coordinates: 37°56′N 6°37′W

- Flag Coat of arms

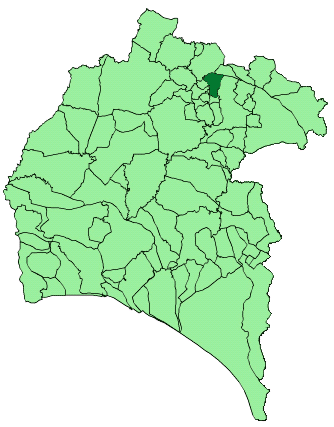
- Map of Cortelazor, Huelva
- Country: Spain
- Autonomous community: Andalusia
- Province: Huelva
- Time zone: UTC+1 (CET)
  - Summer (DST): UTC+2 (CEST)

Cortelazor is a town located in the province of Huelva, Spain. According to the 2005 census, it has a population of 289 inhabitants and covers an area of forty square kilometres. It sits at an altitude of 622 metres above sea level, and is 120 kilometres from the capital.

== See also ==
- List of municipalities in Huelva
