= Campofrío =

Municipality in Spain

Coordinates: 37°46′N 6°34′W

- Municipality
- Concello de Campofrio
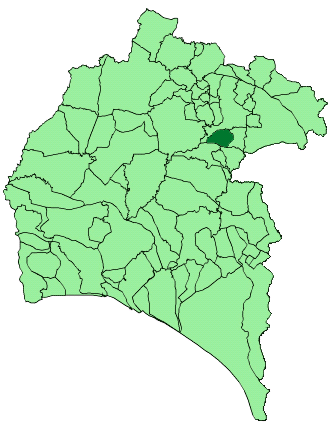
- Map of Campofrío, Huelva

- Flag Coat of arms
- Interactive map of Campofrío
- Country: Spain
- Autonomous community: Andalusia
- Province: Huelva

Area
  - Total: 48 km^{2} (19 sq mi)

Population (2005)
  - Total: ▼810
  - Density: 16/km^{2} (41/sq mi)
- Time zone: UTC+1 (CET)
  - Summer (DST): UTC+2 (CEST)

Campofrío is a town and municipality located in the province of Huelva, Spain. According to the 2005 census, it has a population of 810 inhabitants and covers a 48 km^{2} area (16 people per km^{2}).

== Demographics ==
Historical population
| Year | Pop. | ±% |
|---|---|---|
| 1999 | 861 | — |
| 2000 | 844 | −2.0% |
| 2001 | 832 | −1.4% |
| 2002 | 834 | +0.2% |
| 2003 | 845 | +1.3% |
| 2004 | 832 | −1.5% |
| 2005 | 810 | −2.6% |
Source: INE (Spain)

== See also ==
- List of municipalities in Huelva
