= Cumbres Mayores =

Coordinates: 38°04′N 6°38′W

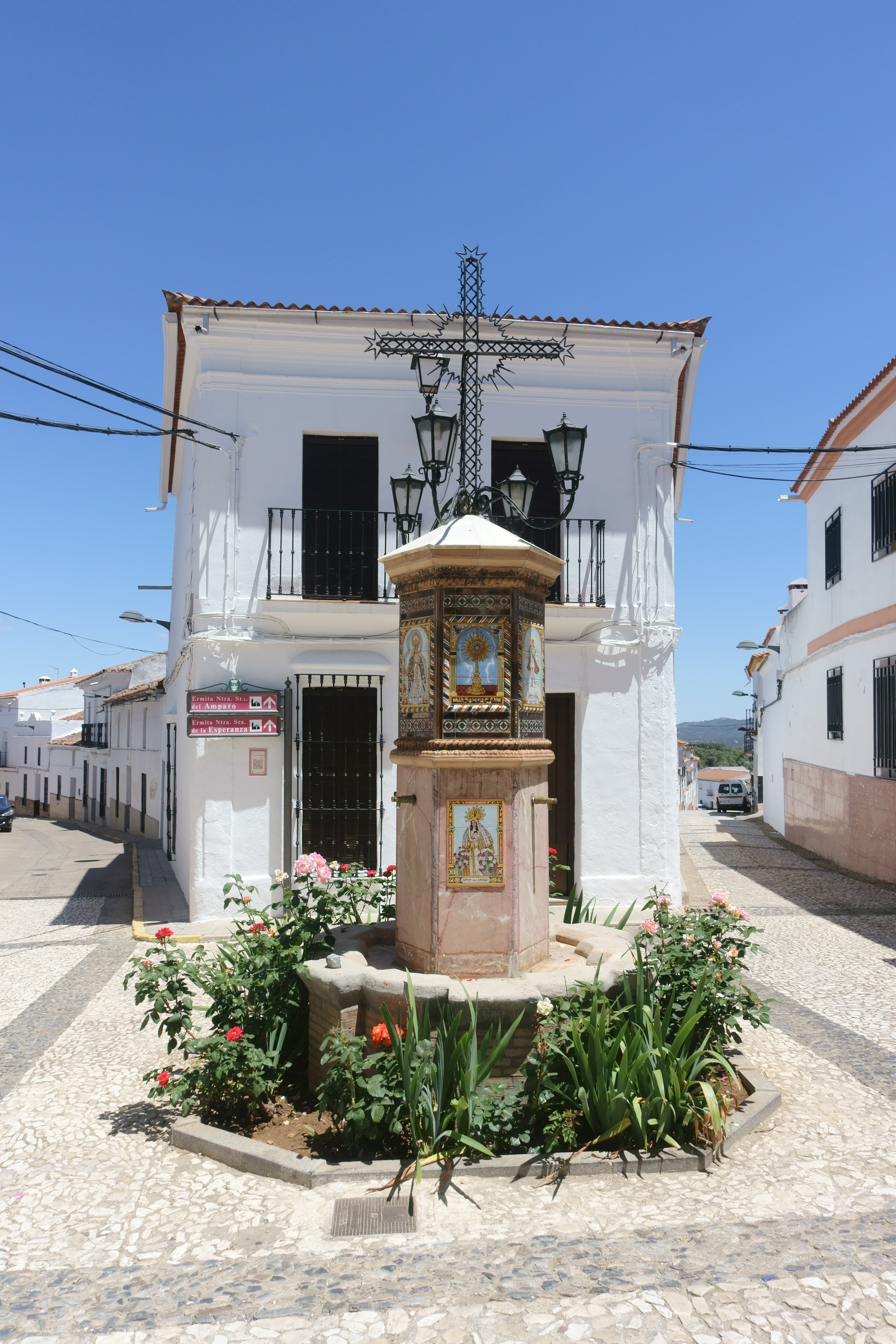

- Flag Coat of arms

- Location in Spain.
- Country: Spain
- Autonomous community: Andalusia
- Province: Huelva

Area
  - Total: 122 km^{2} (47 sq mi)
- Elevation: 711 m (2,333 ft)

Population (2025-01-01)
  - Total: 1,708
  - Density: 14.0/km^{2} (36.3/sq mi)
- Time zone: UTC+1 (CET)
  - Summer (DST): UTC+2 (CEST)
- Website: www.cumbresmayores.es

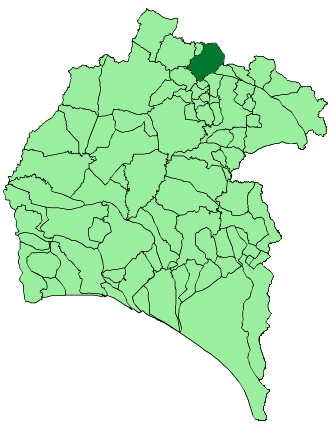
Map of Cumbres Mayores, Huelva

Cumbres Mayores is a town and municipality located in the province of Huelva, Spain. According to the 2025 municipal register, it has a population of 1,708 inhabitants.

== See also ==
- List of municipalities in Huelva
