= Arroyomolinos de León =

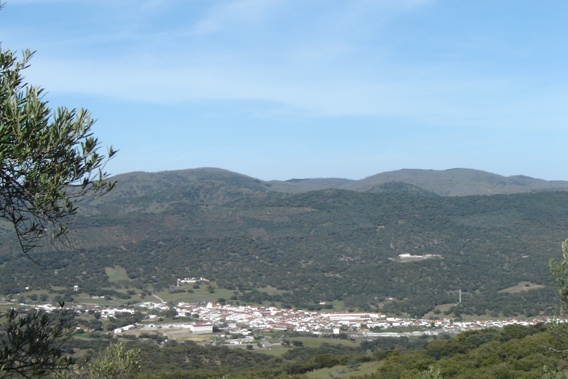

- Flag Coat of arms

- Location in Spain
- Coordinates: 38°01′N 6°25′W
- Municipality: Huelva

Government
  - Mayor: Juan Manuel Ginés Dorado

Area
  - Total: 87 km^{2} (34 sq mi)
  - Land: 87 km^{2} (34 sq mi)
  - Water: 0.00 km^{2} (0 sq mi)

Population (2025-01-01)
  - Total: 907
  - Density: 10/km^{2} (27/sq mi)
- Time zone: UTC+1 (CET)
  - Summer (DST): UTC+2 (CEST)
- Website: arroyomolinosdeleon.com

Arroyomolinos de León is a town and municipality located in the province of Huelva, Spain. According to the 2010 census, the city has a population of 1,046 inhabitants (533 men and 513 women).

== Demographics ==
Historical population
| Year | Pop. | ±% |
|---|---|---|
| 1999 | 1,174 | — |
| 2000 | 1,146 | −2.4% |
| 2001 | 1,124 | −1.9% |
| 2002 | 1,118 | −0.5% |
| 2003 | 1,108 | −0.9% |
| 2004 | 1,096 | −1.1% |
| 2005 | 1,071 | −2.3% |
| 2006 | 1,053 | −1.7% |
| 2007 | 1,034 | −1.8% |
| 2008 | 1,048 | +1.4% |
| 2009 | 1,031 | −1.6% |
| 2010 | 1,046 | +1.5% |
Source: INE (Spain)

== Significant events ==
An explosion equivalent to 190 kilotonnes of TNT occurred over the town on December 8, 1932. A meteoroid, connected to the δ-Arietids meteor shower, exploded 15.7 km (9.8 mi) overhead.

== See also ==
- List of municipalities in Huelva
