= Linares de la Sierra =

Coordinates: 37°53′N 6°37′W

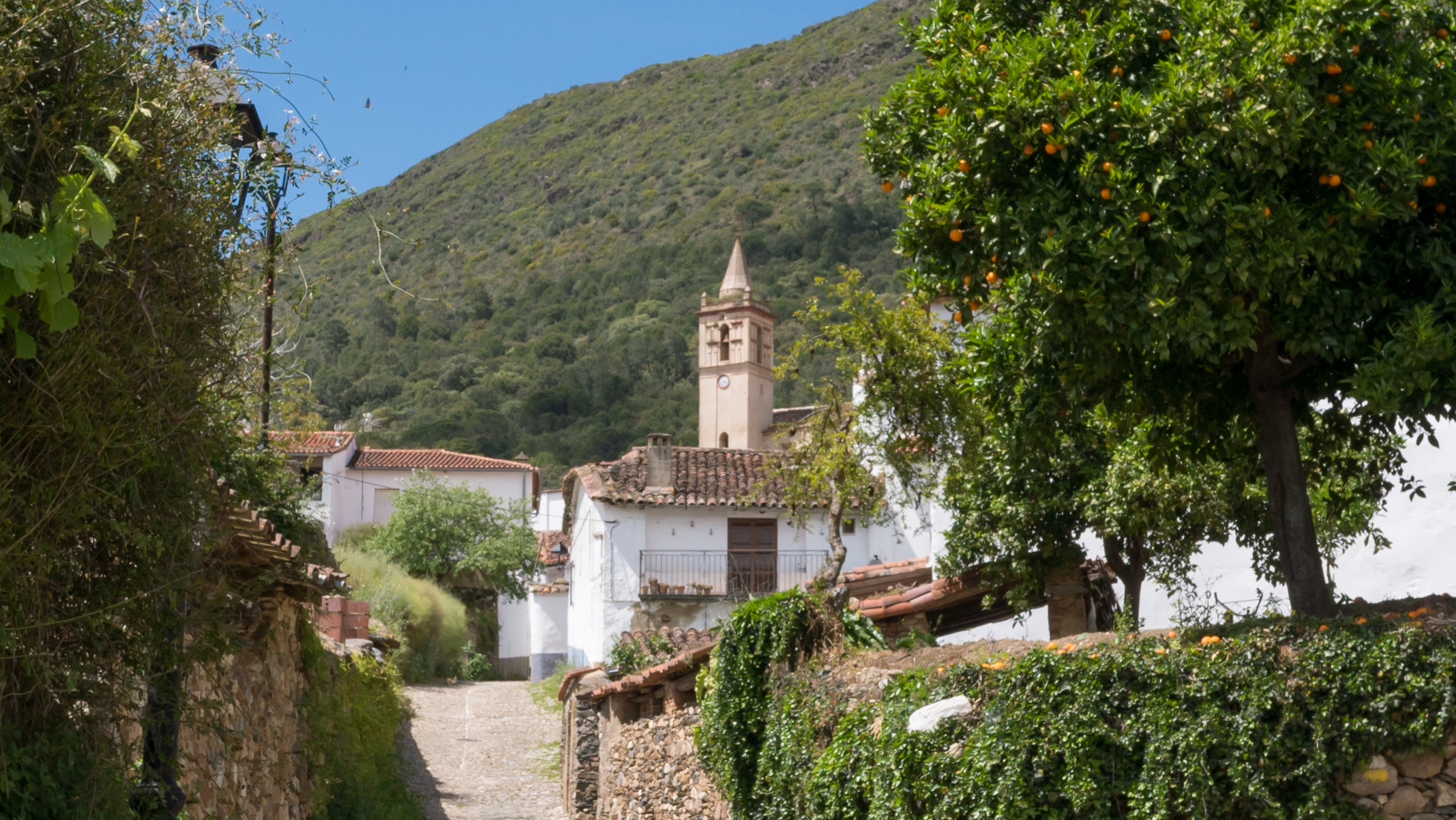

- Flag Coat of arms

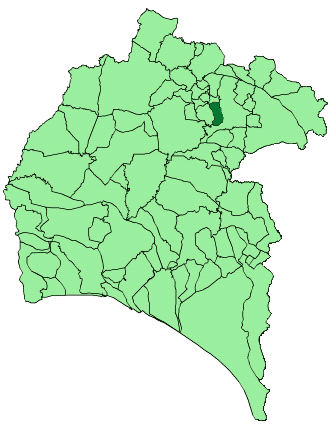

- Location in Spain.
- Country: Spain
- Autonomous community: Andalusia
- Province: Huelva

Area
  - Total: 29 km^{2} (11 sq mi)
- Elevation: 505 m (1,657 ft)

Population (2025-01-01)
  - Total: 279
  - Density: 9.6/km^{2} (25/sq mi)
- Time zone: UTC+1 (CET)
  - Summer (DST): UTC+2 (CEST)
- Website: http://www.linaresdelasierra.com/

Linares de la Sierra is a town and municipality located in the province of Huelva, Spain. According to the 2025 municipal register, the municipality had a population of 279 inhabitants.

== See also ==
- List of municipalities in Huelva
