= Cumbres de San Bartolomé =

Cumbres de San Bartolomé, Spain
- Flag Coat of arms

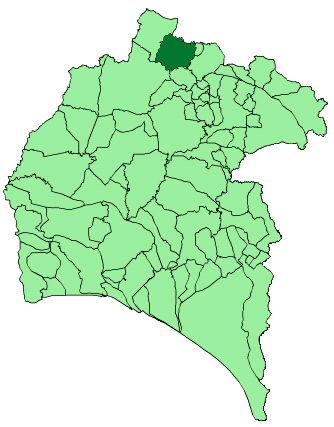
- Location of Cumbres de San Bartolomé
- Coordinates: 38°05′N 6°44′W
- Municipality: Huelva

Government
  - Mayor: Rafael Gómez Sánchez

Area
  - Total: 145 km^{2} (56 sq mi)
  - Land: 145 km^{2} (56 sq mi)
  - Water: 0.00 km^{2} (0 sq mi)
- Elevation: 586 m (1,923 ft)

Population (2025-01-01)
  - Total: 354
  - Density: 2.44/km^{2} (6.32/sq mi)
- Time zone: UTC+1 (CET)
  - Summer (DST): UTC+2 (CEST)

Cumbres de San Bartolomé is a city located in the province of Huelva, Spain. According to the 2025 municipal register, the city has a population of 354 inhabitants.

== Demographics ==
Historical population
| Year | Pop. | ±% |
|---|---|---|
| 1999 | 572 | — |
| 2000 | 575 | +0.5% |
| 2001 | 557 | −3.1% |
| 2002 | 553 | −0.7% |
| 2003 | 541 | −2.2% |
| 2004 | 523 | −3.3% |
| 2005 | 500 | −4.4% |
Source: INE (Spain)

== See also ==
- List of municipalities in Huelva
