= Cumbres de Enmedio =

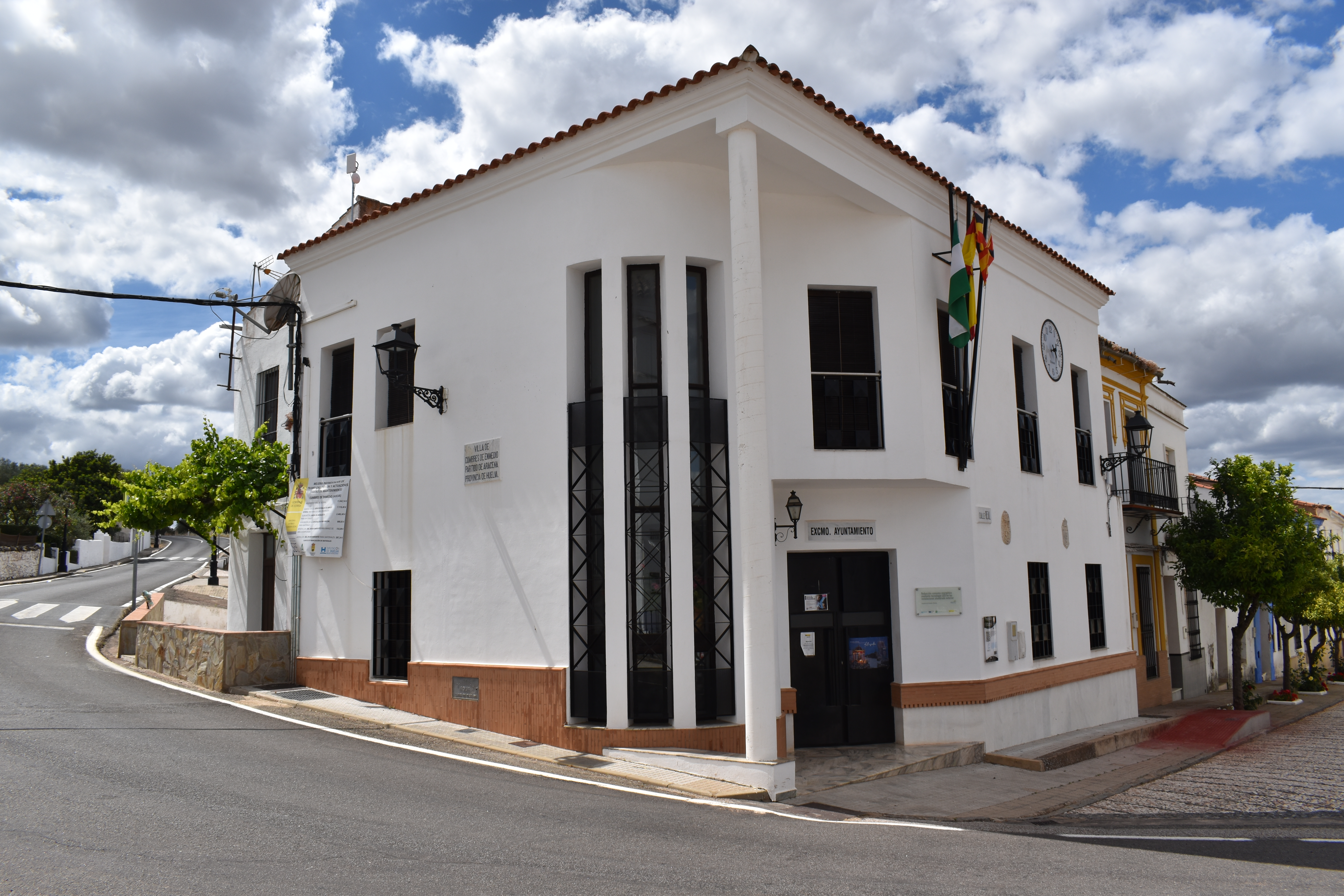

- Flag Coat of arms

- Location of Cumbres de Enmedio in Spain
- Coordinates: 38°04′N 6°41′W
- Country: Spain
- Autonomous community: Andalusia
- Province: Huelva

Area
  - Total: 14 km^{2} (5.4 sq mi)
- Elevation: 593 m (1,946 ft)

Population (2025-01-01)
  - Total: 54
  - Density: 3.9/km^{2} (10/sq mi)
- Time zone: UTC+1 (CET)
  - Summer (DST): UTC+2 (CEST)
- Website: www.cumbresdeenmedio.org

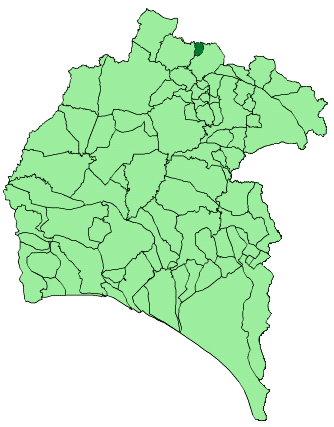
Map of Cumbres de Enmedio, Huelva

Cumbres de Enmedio is a town and municipality located in the province of Huelva, Spain. According to the 2025 municipal register, it has a population of 54 inhabitants. it covers a 14 km^{2} (5.4 sq mi) area (3.4 people/km^{2}). It sits at an altitude of 593 m (1,946 ft) above sea level, and is 140 km (87 mi) from the capital.

== See also ==
- List of municipalities in Huelva
