= La Nava =

Coordinates: 37°58′N 6°32′W

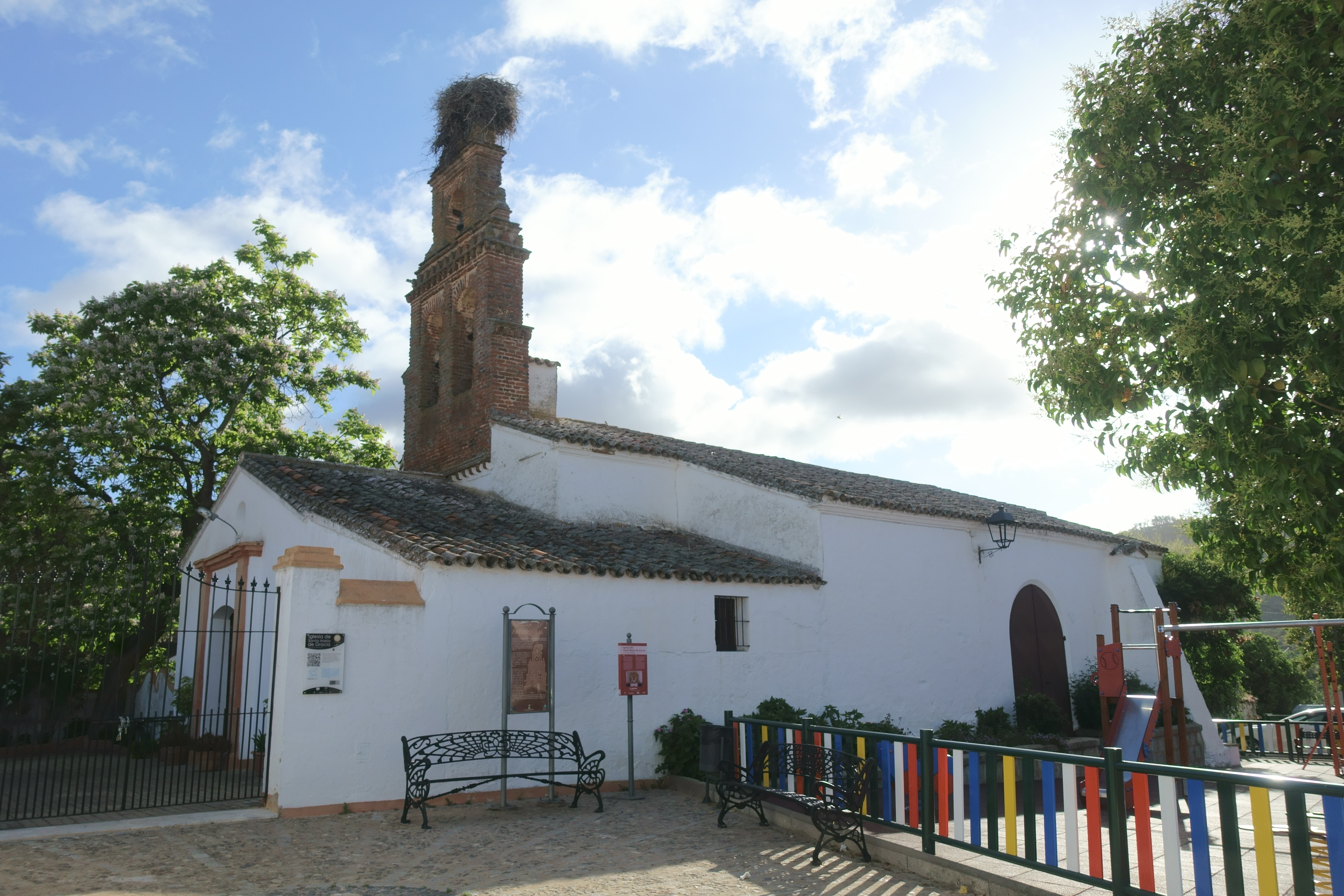
- Church of Our Lady of Grace, La Nava

- Flag Coat of arms

- Location in Spain.
- Country: Spain
- Autonomous community: Andalusia
- Province: Huelva

Area
  - Total: 62 km^{2} (24 sq mi)
- Elevation: 418 m (1,371 ft)

Population (2025-01-01)
  - Total: 271
  - Density: 4.4/km^{2} (11/sq mi)
- Time zone: UTC+1 (CET)
  - Summer (DST): UTC+2 (CEST)
- Website: http://www.lanava.es/es/

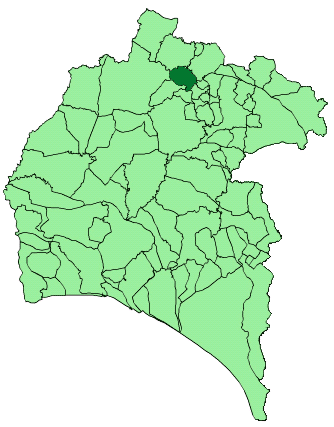
Map of La Nava, Huelva

La Nava is a town and municipality located in the province of Huelva, Spain. According to the 2025 municipal register, the municipality had a population of 271 inhabitants.

== See also ==
- List of municipalities in Huelva
