= Castaño del Robledo =

Municipality in Spain

Coordinates: 37°53′N 6°42′W

- Concello de Castaño del Robledo
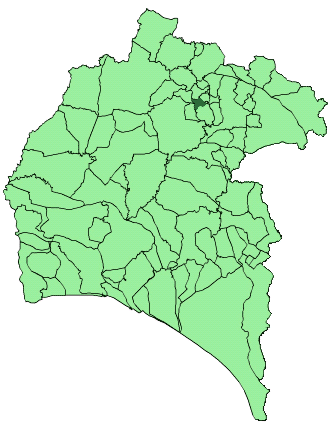
- Map of Castaño del Robledo, Huelva

- Flag Seal
- Interactive map of Castaño del Robledo
- Country: Spain
- Autonomous community: Andalusia
- Province: Huelva

Area
  - Total: 13 km^{2} (5.0 sq mi)
- Elevation: 738 m (2,421 ft)

Population (2005)
  - Total: 205
- Time zone: UTC+1 (CET)
  - Summer (DST): UTC+2 (CEST)

Castaño del Robledo is a town and municipality located in the province of Huelva, Spain. According to the 2005 census, it has a population of 205 inhabitants and covers a 13 km^{2} (5.0 sq mi) area (15.8 people/km²).

== Demography ==
According to the 2005 census, it has a population of 205 inhabitants. It has a population density of 15.8 per km^{2}.

== Geography ==
It sits at an altitude of 738 m (2,421 ft) above sea level, and is 113 km (70 mi) from the capital. Its area is 13 km^{2} (5.0 sq mi).

== See also ==
- List of municipalities in Huelva
