= Zalamea la Real =

Coordinates: 37°41′N 6°39′W

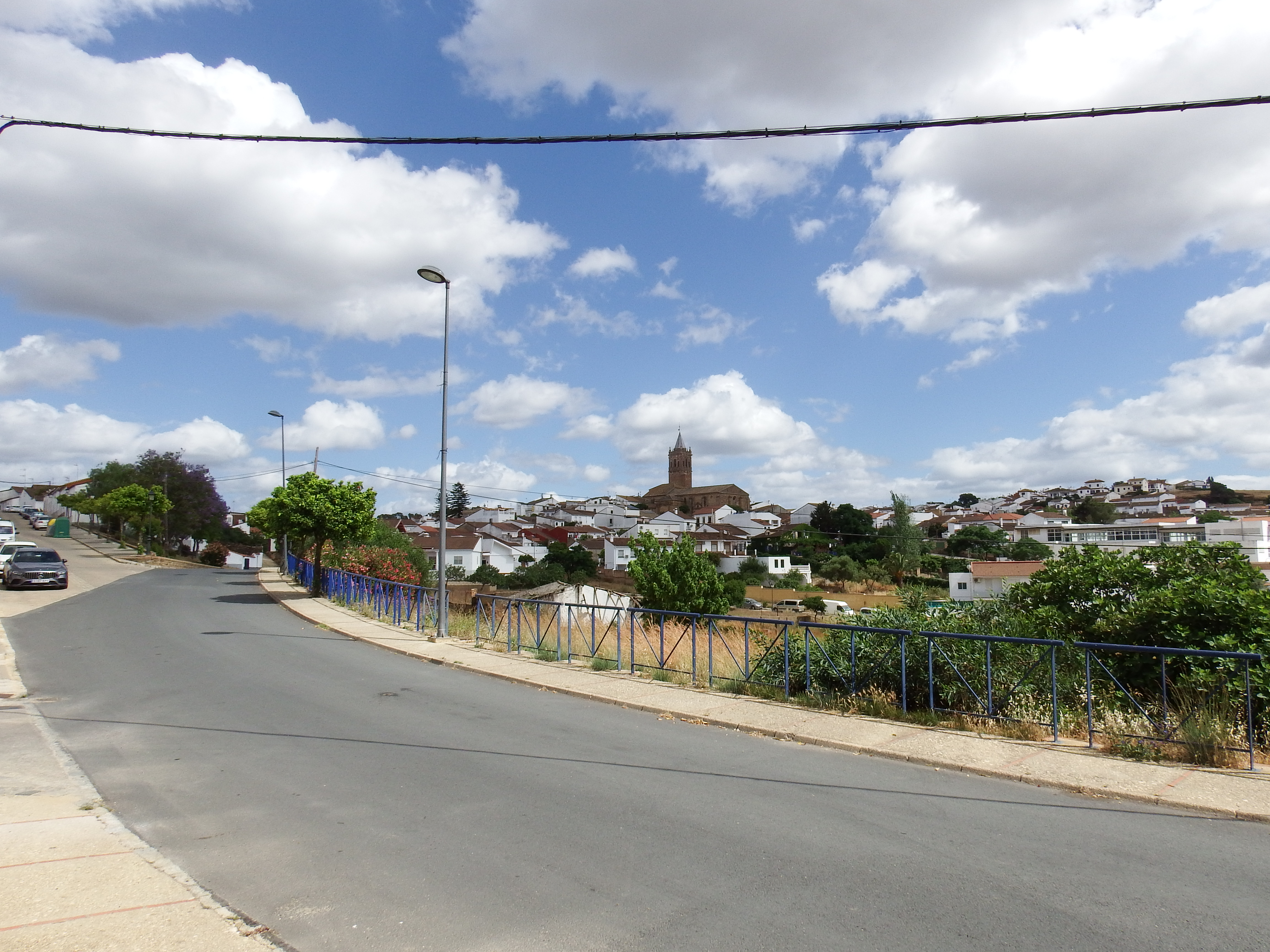

- Flag Coat of arms

- Location in Spain.
- Country: Spain
- Autonomous community: Andalusia
- Province: Huelva

Area
  - Total: 238.86 km^{2} (92.22 sq mi)
- Elevation: 412 m (1,352 ft)

Population (2025-01-01)
  - Total: 2,968
  - Density: 12.43/km^{2} (32.18/sq mi)
- Time zone: UTC+1 (CET)
  - Summer (DST): UTC+2 (CEST)

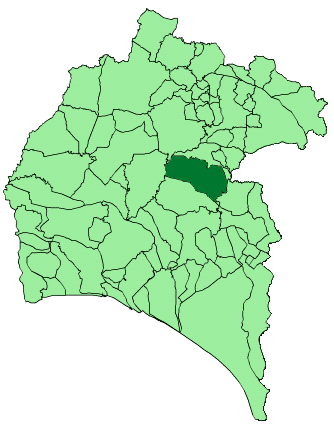
Map of Zalamea la Real, Huelva

Zalamea la Real is a town and municipality located in the province of Huelva, Spain. According to the 2005 census, it had a population of 3,547 inhabitants and covers a 240 km^{2} (93 sq mi) area (14.8 people/km^{2}). It sits at an altitude of 412 m (1,352 ft) above sea level, and is 67 km (42 mi) from the capital.

== See also ==
- List of municipalities in Huelva
