= Los Marines =

Coordinates: 37°54′N 6°37′W

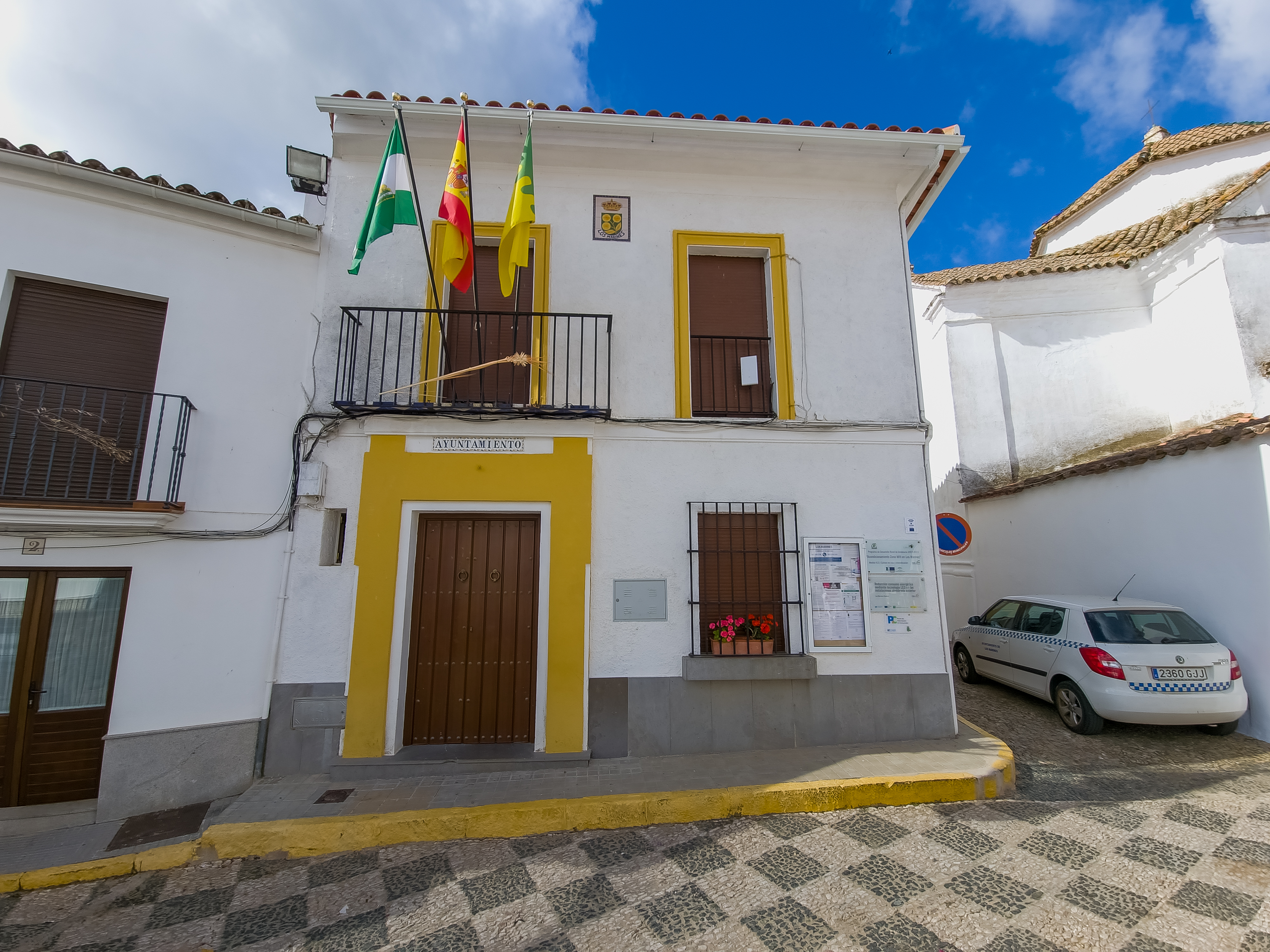

- Flag Coat of arms

- Location in Spain.
- Country: Spain
- Autonomous community: Andalusia
- Province: Huelva

Area
  - Total: 10 km^{2} (3.9 sq mi)
- Elevation: 718 m (2,356 ft)

Population (2025-01-01)
  - Total: 436
  - Density: 44/km^{2} (110/sq mi)
- Time zone: UTC+1 (CET)
  - Summer (DST): UTC+2 (CEST)

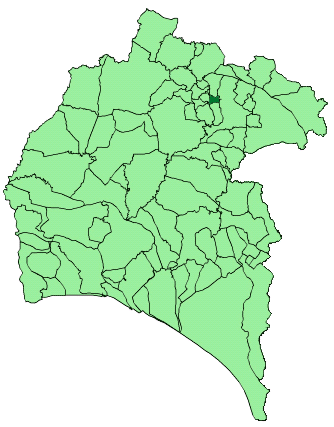
Map of Los Marines, Huelva

Los Marines is a town and municipality located in the province of Huelva, Spain. According to the 2025 municipal register, the municipality had a population of 436 inhabitants.

== See also ==
- List of municipalities in Huelva
