= Galaroza =

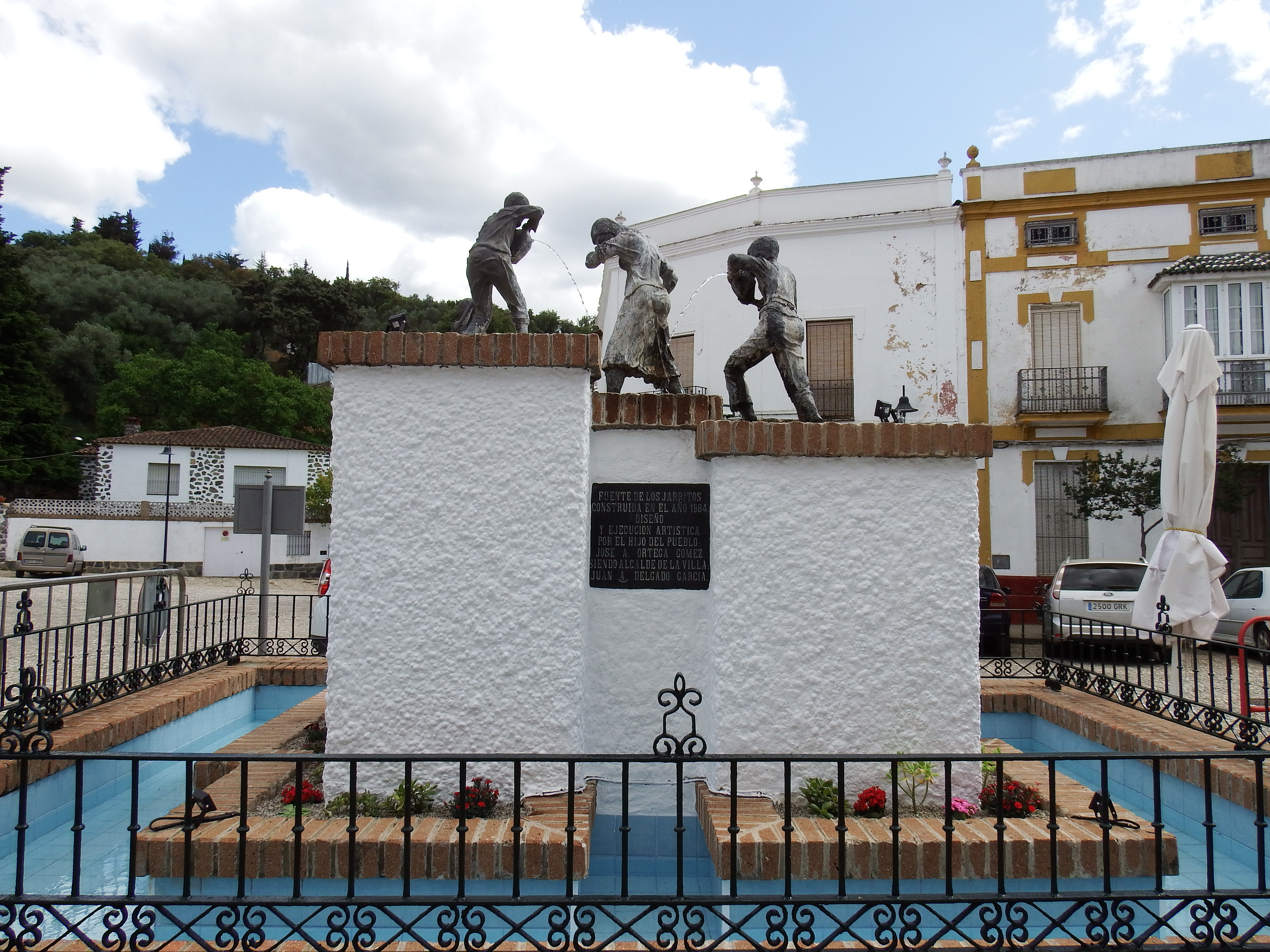

- Flag Coat of arms

- Location of Galaroza in Spain
- Coordinates: 37°55′N 6°42′W
- Country: Spain
- Autonomous community: Andalusia
- Province: Huelva

Area
  - Total: 22.27 km^{2} (8.60 sq mi)
- Elevation: 568 m (1,864 ft)

Population (2025-01-01)
  - Total: 1,366
  - Density: 61.34/km^{2} (158.9/sq mi)
- Time zone: UTC+1 (CET)
  - Summer (DST): UTC+2 (CEST)
- Website: http://www.galaroza.es/es/

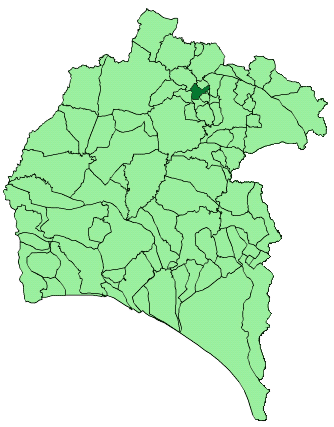
Map of Galaroza, Huelva

Galaroza is a town and municipality located in the Parque Natural de la Sierra de Aracena y Picos de Aroche, which is in the province of Huelva, Spain.According to the 2025 municipal register, the municipality has a population of 1,366 inhabitants.

== See also ==
- List of municipalities in Huelva
