= Hinojales =

Coordinates: 38°00′N 6°35′W

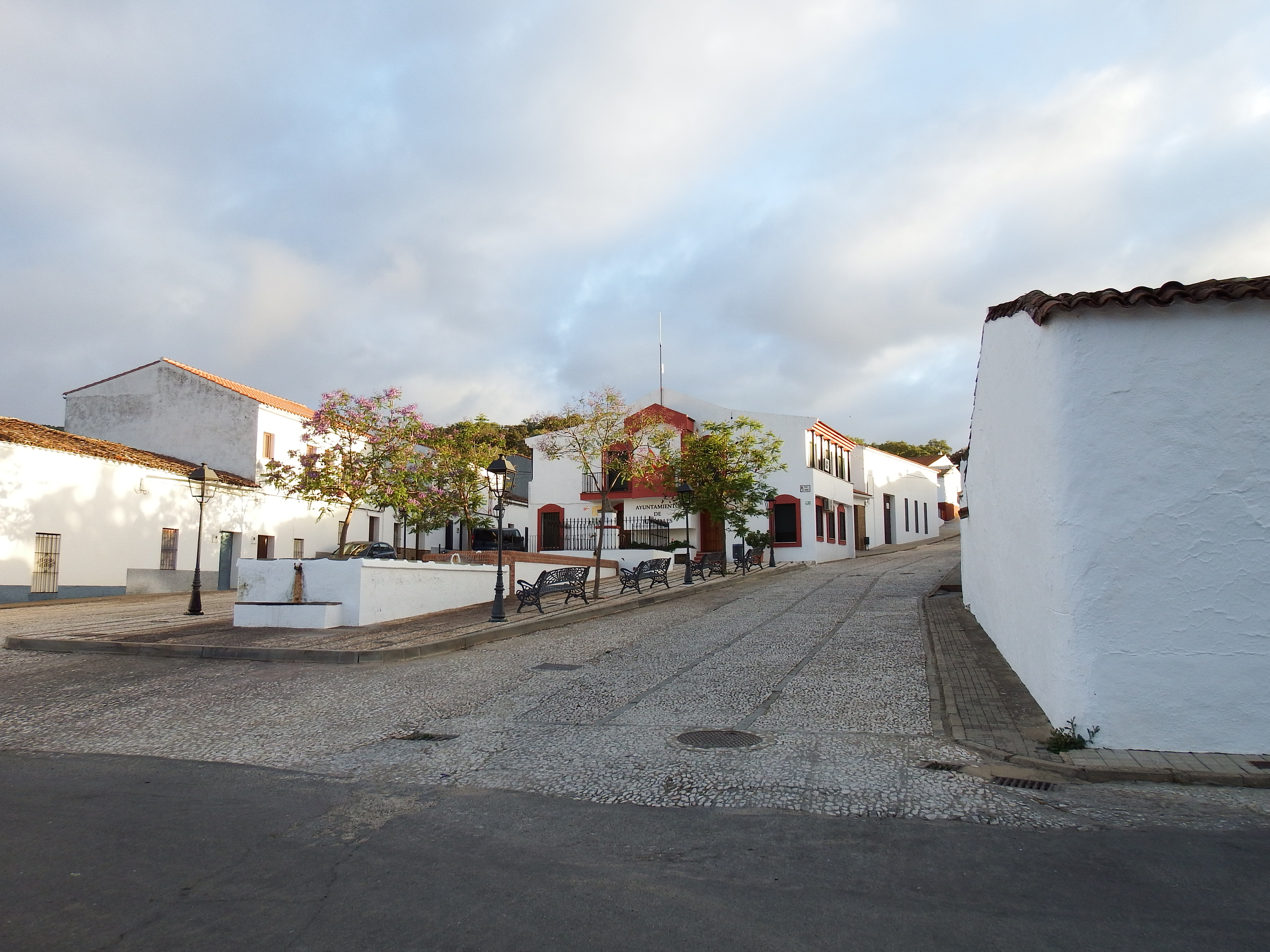

- Flag Coat of arms

- Location in Spain.
- Country: Spain
- Autonomous community: Andalusia
- Province: Huelva

Area
  - Total: 11.48 km^{2} (4.43 sq mi)
- Elevation: 621 m (2,037 ft)

Population (2025-01-01)
  - Total: 314
  - Density: 27.4/km^{2} (70.8/sq mi)
- Time zone: UTC+1 (CET)
  - Summer (DST): UTC+2 (CEST)
- Website: http://www.hinojales.es/es/

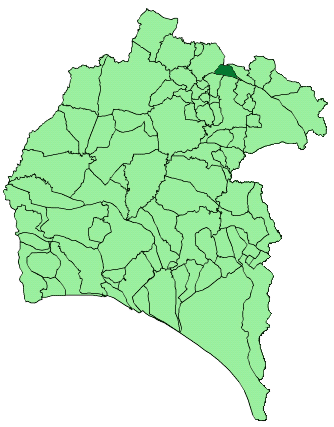
Map of Hinojales, Huelva

Hinojales is a town and municipality located in the province of Huelva, Spain. According to the 2025 municipal register, the municipality had a population of 314 inhabitants.

== See also ==
- List of municipalities in Huelva
