= Amblypalpis olivierella =

Scientific classification
- Domain: Eukaryota
- Kingdom: Animalia
- Phylum: Arthropoda
- Class: Insecta
- Order: Lepidoptera
- Family: Gelechiidae
- Genus: Amblypalpis
- Species: A. olivierella

Binomial name
- Amblypalpis olivierella Ragonot, 1886

Species of moth

Amblypalpis olivierella, the tamarix spindle-gall moth, is a species of moth in the family Gelechiidae. It was described by Émile Louis Ragonot in 1886. It is found in Tunisia, Algeria, Libya, the Sinai, Egypt, Israel, Jordan, northern Yemen and the United Arab Emirates, Iran, India and Pakistan.

The larvae have been recorded inducing galls on Tamarix brachystylis, Tamarix bounopaea, Tamarix articulata and Tamarix africana.
