= Marismas de Isla Cristina =

Protected area in Andalusia, Spain

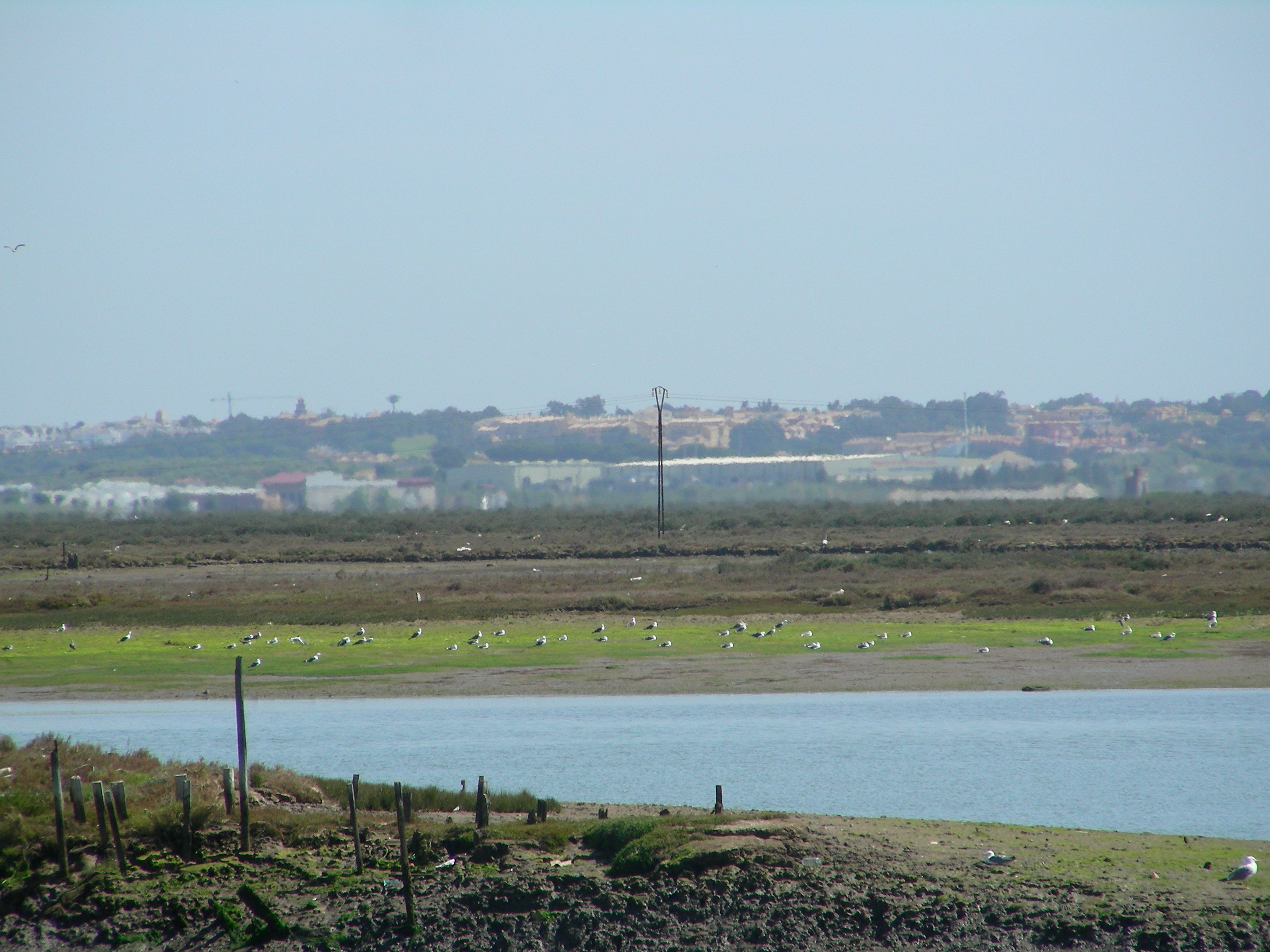

- Location within Province of Huelva
- Coordinates: 37.207718°N 7.362343°W
- Area: 21.45 km^{2} (8.28 sq mi)
- Designation: Site of Special Scientific Interest
- Authorized: September 23, 1989
- Website: Natural England website

The Marismas de Isla Cristina ("Cristina Island marshes") are located at the mouth of the river Carreras in the province of Huelva, Andalusia, in southern Spain. Created in 1989 (Law 2/89 of the inventory of the Protected Natural Spaces of Andalusia), the natural park has a surface area of 21.45 square kilometres (8.28 sq mi), shared between the municipalities of Ayamonte and Isla Cristina.

== Structure ==
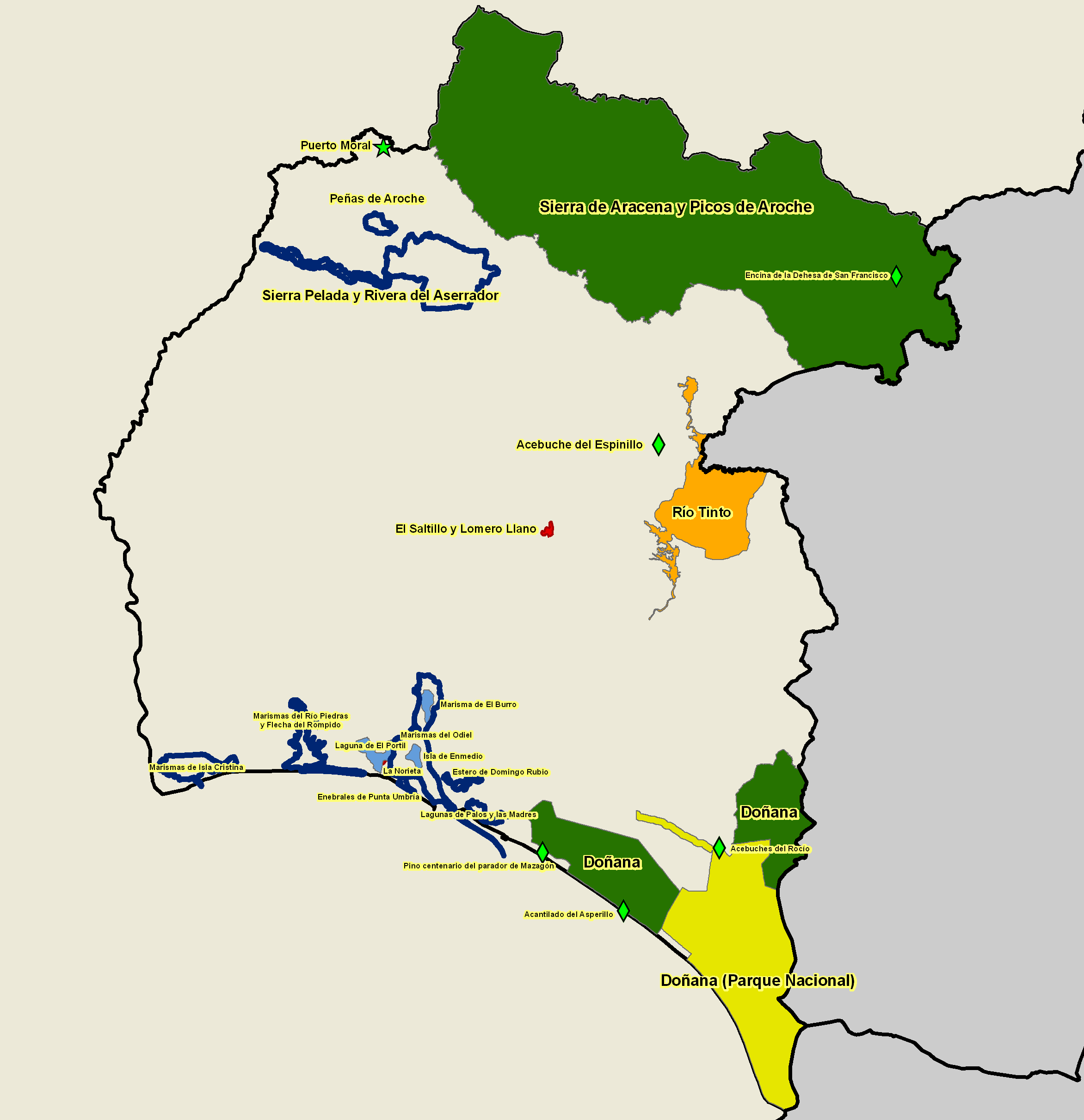
Network of nature parks (RENPA) in Huelva

The marshes are shared between the municipalities of Isla Cristina for 7.44 square kilometres (2.87 sq mi) and Ayamonte for some 14.00 square kilometres (5.41 sq mi).

Marshes in general are humid areas, low-lying, swampy terrains that are flooded by sea water during high tide. They usually lay in estuaries areas, such as here.

The tidal dependence of these ecosystems gives them an almost total absence of seasonality. From the landscape point of view one can differentiate between the marshes, those areas in which man's intervention has transformed the ecosystem for its own use and the other better preserved areas.

Where the marshes have been transformed, among others for the development of marine aquaculture, bodies of water distributed as ponds and pools are the main elements of the landscape. Despite the uses developed in this area they maintain the original channels and estuaries of the marsh. The constancy that the marsh has acquired is very significant. In the areas where the marshes are better preserved, it maintains the characteristic bushes of these wetlands. The vegetation consists of communities of halophytes, typical of these types of habitats and adapted to the daily tidal flooding.
The animal communities are also important. The birds are the most representative group in this ecosystem, contributing an important peculiarity to the landscape. The homogeneity of the color of the scrub is contrasted with the presence of water, an element which carries great attraction. In this reserve the panoramic landscape has a special importance; its very flatness allows a scenery with very broad views, opening to one's view the lands of neighboring units, emphasizing the views of the city of Isla Cristina or of the pine forest. A highlight throughout the day are the distinct tonalities of the marsh due to the changes in light as the day goes by.

Follows a more detailed description of the different parts comprised within the Marshes of Cristina Island.

=== Carrera marsh ===
The unit is 266.12 hectares. It is a protected natural place where needlegrass (esparto) is the most abundant species along with halophyte (salt tolerant) species. In less flooded areas appear the broom bush and the reed. The geomorphology shows a large flat coastal fringe, a transition from land to sea with seasonal fluctuations. The bird life (see Fauna for more details) of the marsh includes many species of water fowl which bring great value to the unit. Along with the fauna of the highly valued ecological marsh, one should emphasize the values of the landscape, since the unit is of great interest both for its high quality and its fragility. In the southern part it is closely bound to the city of Isla Cristina, in the north the marsh is bordered by the Verde Litoral road.

=== The Meadow marsh (Marisma del Prado) ===
Known as Prado Hondo, this arm of the marsh covers 30.29 hectares dried up for the cultivation of strawberries. The environmental characteristics of the area are very similar to the above Carrera marsh. This small part of the marsh borders the Redondela, from which starts a path.

=== Puntal Canal marsh ===
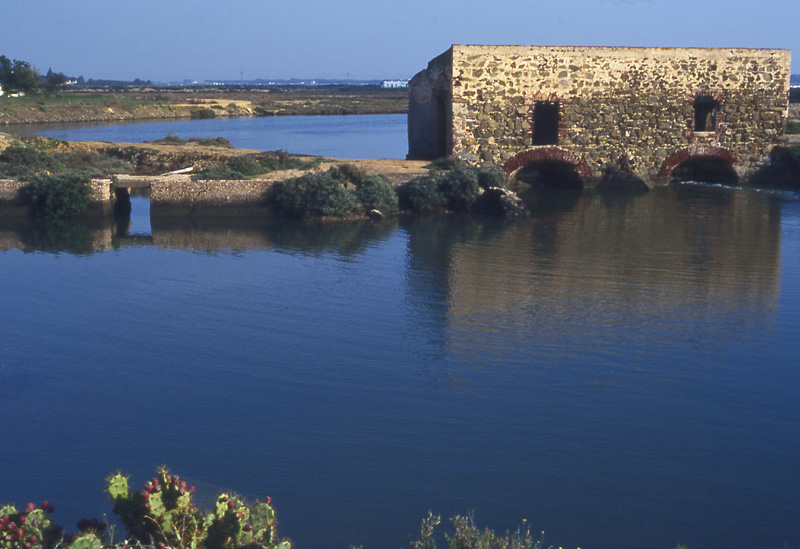
The tidal mill before restoration

It includes the west part of the marsh between the city of Isla Cristina, the reed area (cañas) and the limit of Ayamonte, with an area of 371.24 hectares. It is a degraded marsh, transformed long ago for the exploitation of table salt and currently developing aquaculture. These uses degrade the marsh, bringing homogenisation and impoverishment that weigh on its ecological value. Here stands a well-preserved tidal mill (es: El Pintado tidal mill) restored in 1995, presently used as a small visitors' center.

=== Transformed marsh of Carreras ===
An environmental unit with similar characteristics to the Puntal Canal marsh, occupying 76.62 hectares, this area includes three transformed places of the marsh, in the area of Carrera. The human uses that are developing are: aquaculture, with the building of pools which divide the marsh, and the cultivation of strawberries, all resulting in damage to the marshes.

=== The Moral ===
The 311 hectares hydrophilic, halophytic grasslands with tidal influence have been transformed with the repopulation of tamarisks (Tamarix canariensis, Tamarix africana) and the formation of well-preserved salt marshes of salicornia (Arthrocnemetea), and grasslands of eel grass (Spartina densiflora). Within the Mediterranean mountain (presence of copses of Mediterranean deciduous species) some endemic taxa appear such as Teucrium algarviense, Thymus mastichina subs. that are not included in the ecosystem in study although they belong to the unit for the protection of the marsh.

=== The Slumps' Saltworks (Salinas de los Pérez) ===
A tidal marsh with Arthrocaulon macrostachyum (former Arthrocnemum) as typical vegetation, it also shelters protected endemic relic species Picris wilkommi and other rare species such as Armeria linkiana and Spergularia fimbriata, spread over about 166 hectares. Its basin is transformed by saltworks. See Flora for the species specific to the marsh.

=== The Tamijar ===
An important formation of halophytes (sarcocornia), its characteristics are similar to that of the caño del puntal (see flora for more details). It is one of the main units of the nature reserve with 589 hectares and various saltworks. Its northern part is crossed by the Via Verde Litoral road. Some continental marshes retain important halophyte prairies of needlegrass (esparto). Populations of waders, laridae (gulls), ardeidae (herons) and others, are abundant. See flora and fauna for the species typical of the marsh.

=== Robalito Point ===
Ii includes the Canela lagoon and Pinillo lagoon on its northern and southern fringes, leaving an area of saltworks near the heart of Ayamonte which degrades the marsh's landscape. This unit forms a 237 hectares island of almajos and Frankeniaceae prairies. In its southern area the degradation from urbanisation is quite high.

=== Salón de Santa Gadea ===
Connects directly with Ayamonte and more than half of its 97 hectares are salty. Almajos and needlegrass are the most abundant vegetation.

== Geography ==
The current hydrography goes back to the 1755 Lisbon earthquake and the successive accumulation and removal of sediments, as well as being influenced by the Guadiana and recently the Tinto-Odiel rivers because of the construction of the Juan Carlos I breakwater and other dikes that modify the flow of sediments. For a structure by zones, see the structure of the marshes.

They frame the Carreras river estuary, greatly influencing it with the dykes on the west and east of Isla Cristina port town and largely limiting the accumulation of deposits and the decrease of river branching. It includes an extensive system of estuaries and canals which flow a dicha ria. To the west they are limited by the town of Ayamonte and by the Sapal Nature Reserve of Castro Marim and Vila Real de Santo António (belonging to the Guadiana river). To the north the Vía Verde Litoral road, to the south Isla Cristina city and the Atlantic Ocean and an area of Mediterranean pine forest and dunes of ICONA (Instituto para la Conservación de la Naturaleza) and finally to the east an area close to the heart of the Redondela.

The drainage and import of water come essentially from the Atlantic Ocean. The Guadiana river brings sediments and maintains the integrity of the canals in the Isla Cristina marshes. Consequently, there are different degrees of salinity among the marshes. Some parts of the marshes can be and are commercially exploited to extract salt.

It is a place where the littoral and sediments dynamics have triggered a whole complex of coastal formations in the mouth of the Guadiana river estuary, resulting from the interaction of wind, waves, tides, the river, and human impact through tidal engineering works as seen.

== Visiting the nature park ==
There are bird-watching points in several places by the marshes and Via Verde, from the discontinued Huelva-Ayamonte railway, crosses it lengthwise. This trail is particularly suitable for hiking and cycling thanks to the slight slope of the railway. Other hiking routes with interpretation points are located at Prado Pond, Molino tidal marsh of Pozo del Camino and the Duque saltworks.

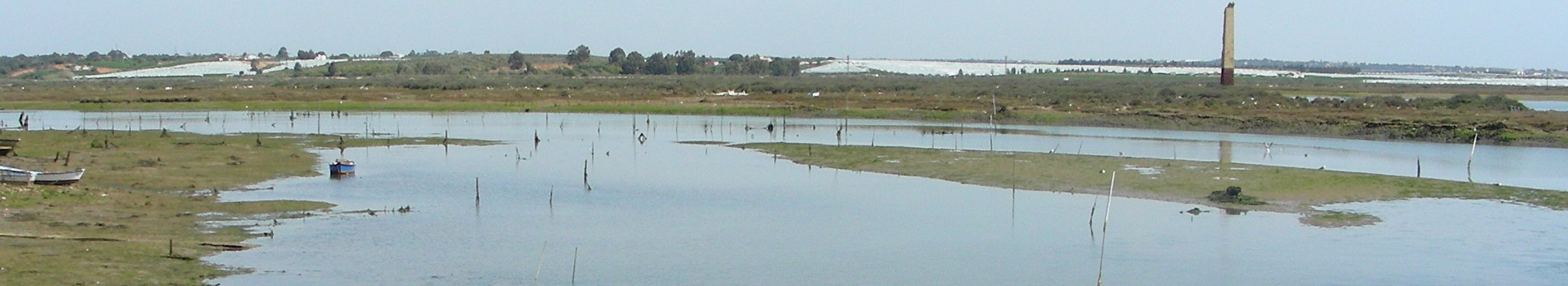
Northern landscape of the nature reserve : caño del puntal

There are three signposted paths in the marshes:

- Laguna del Prado: accessible from and close to the village center of La Redondela. It is 1,192 metres (1,304 yd) long.
- Tidal mill of the Pozo path: direct access from the Via Verde road near the Pozo del Camino. It is 835 metres (913 yd) long.
- The Duke saltworks: accessible from the north of Punta del Morral. It allows bird watching. It is 7.15 kilometres (4.44 mi) long and represents about 2 hours' walk.

== Ecomuseum ==
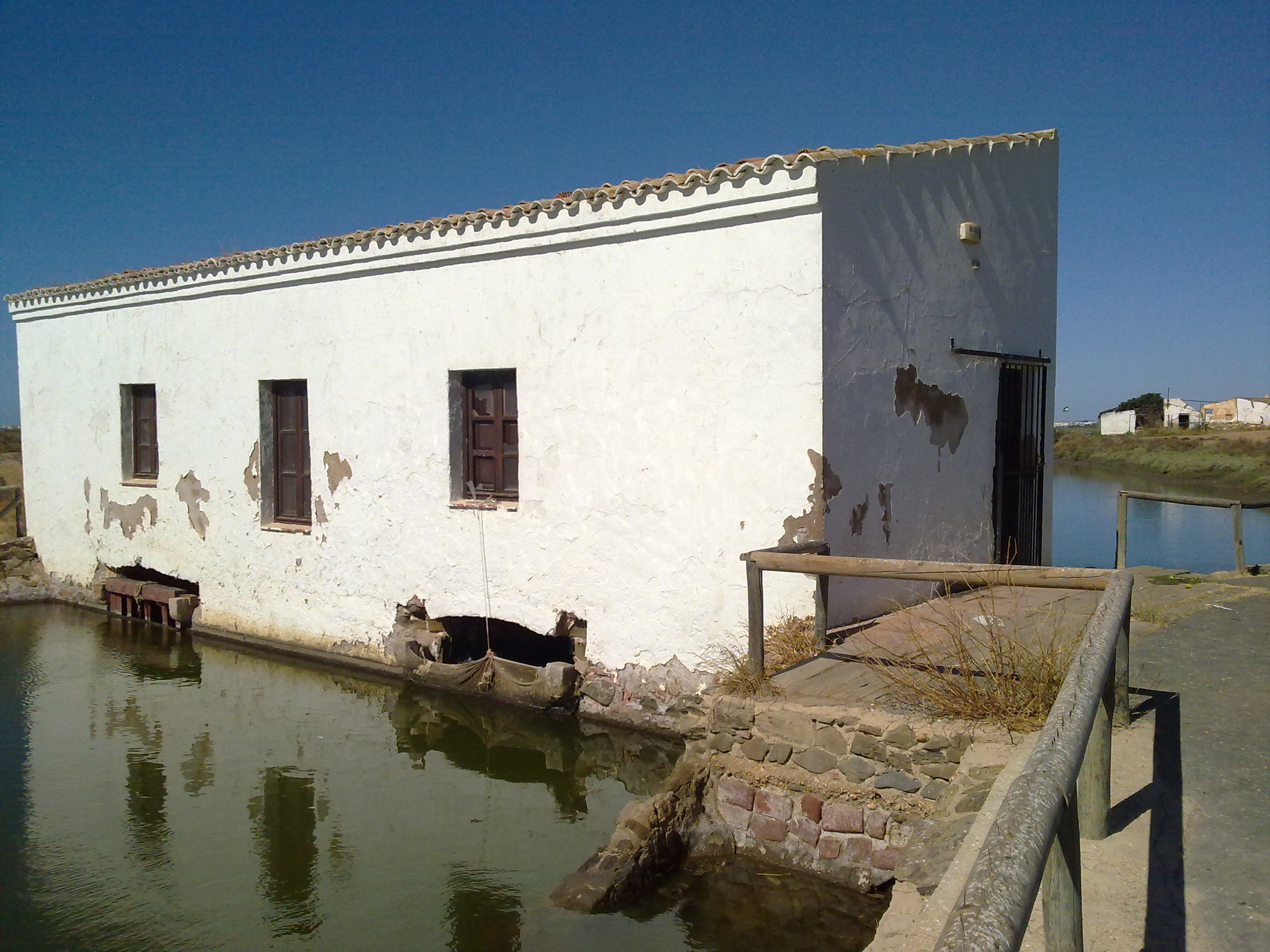
The tidal mill after restoration

The ecomuseum of the Christina Island marshes is located by the tidal mill of the Pozo path. It includes an Interpretation Center of man and the marsh. This tidal mill dates from the 18th century and has been rehabilitated. In it one can discover how man has exploited the marshes in varying forms for his benefit, within the possibilities offered by the marshes. Known as the Painted's Mill, it had 6 mills and was constructed by the locally born patron of the ayamontino area, Manuel Rivero (es) (a.k.a. El Pintado or The Painted).

In the oyster stone masonry, marine limestone brought by their ships from Cadiz and worked to grind wheat for bread that often came from Obispado de Cordoba, after loading in Seville.
April 3rd, 2009, ADN, Cadiz

In October, 2009 was inaugurated in this building a museum of the marshes in which this ecosystem of wetlands can be interpreted.

== Biology ==
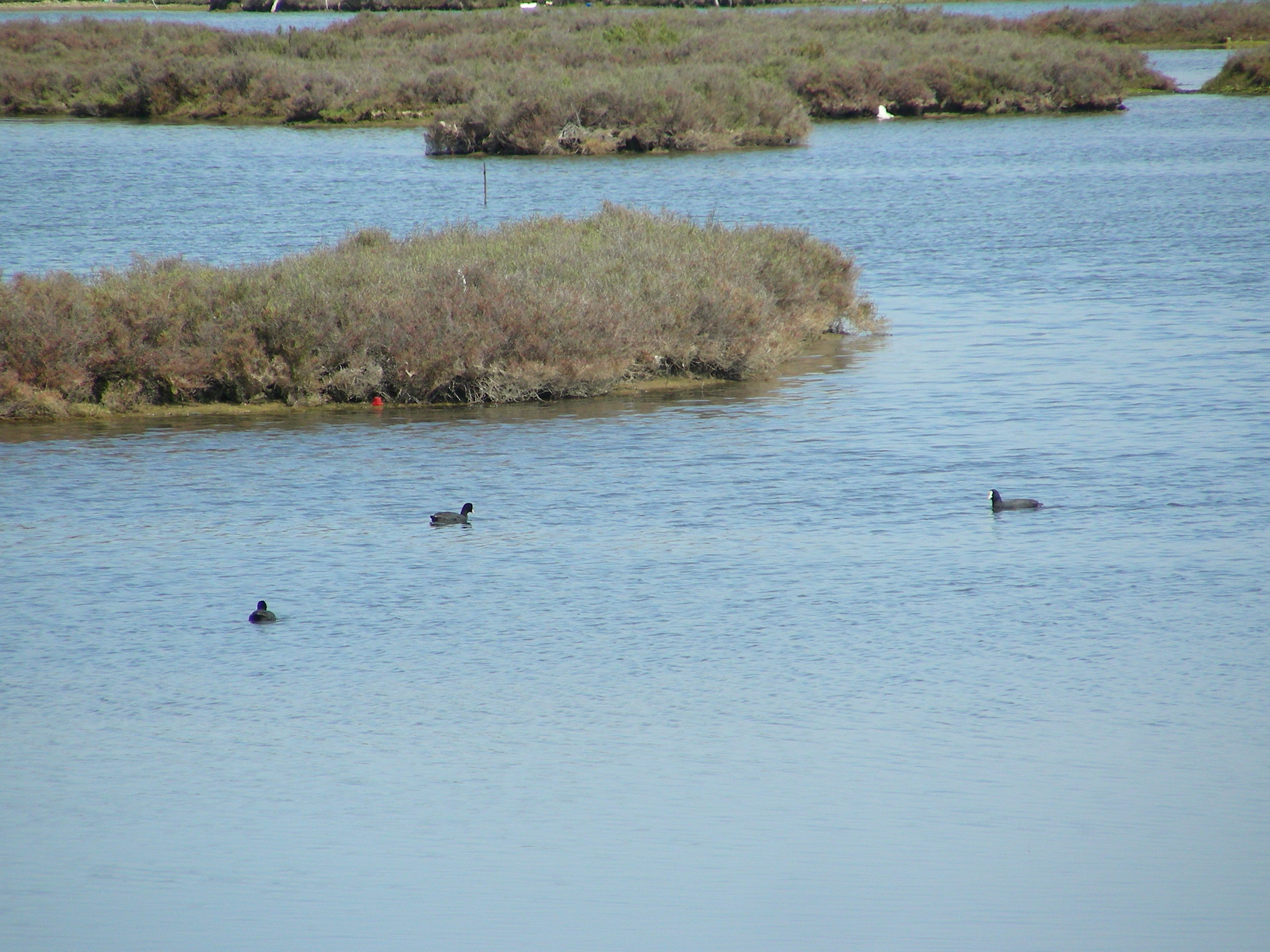
Bird sighting

Fortunately, this tidal landscape is reasonably preserved. The presence of a faunal community linked with humid areas – with a multitude of protected species which use it as a wintering, breeding and nesting place – imposes the highest conversation and preservation measures on this place. Information panels at various locations of the reserve help to understand how it works and therefore its preservation.

In the marsh these panels highlight the aquatic birds, whose most significant species are those present in the LIC (Lugares de Importancia Comunitaria) of Isla Cristina marsh (ES6150005). This marsh includes the same area surface as the ZEPA (Zona de Especial Protección para las Aves) and is proposed as a Special Conservation Area (Zona de Especial Conservación). The most relevant animal species among the mammals is the otter (Lutra lutra) which is listed in Annex II of the Community Directive of Habitats (D. 92/43 CEE) as a Species of Community Interest for whose conservation are imposed the creation of Special Zones of Conservation. Likewise 22 birds appear in the marsh which are listed in Annex I of the Directive n° 79/409/CEE and 41 migratory birds regularly present that are not listed in said annex.

== Flora ==
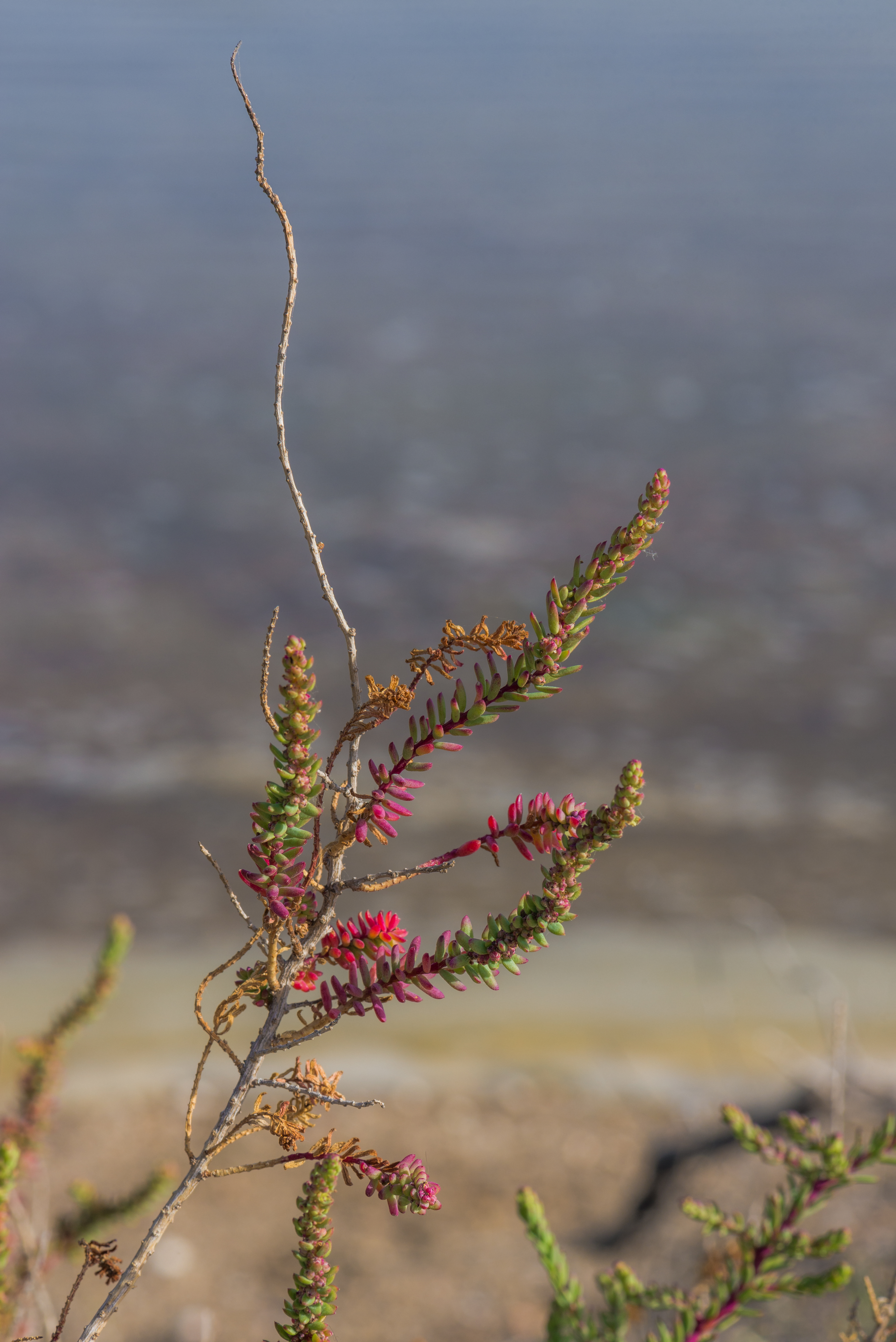
Shrubby Sea-blite

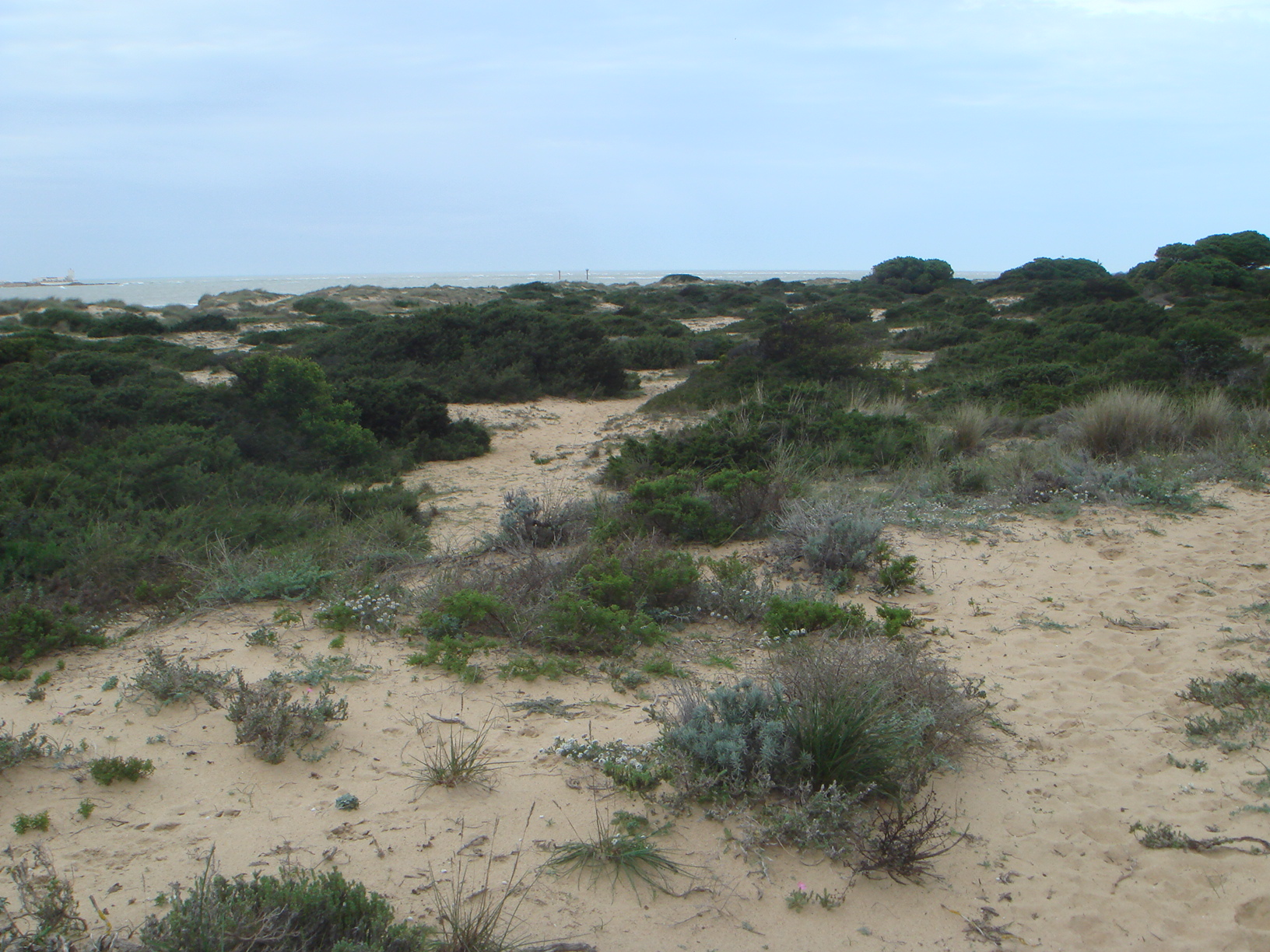
Phoenicean juniper

Shrublike species must by necessity be adapted to saline conditions, making the number of species not as abundant as the fauna. The flora most represented is mainly composed of:

- Stone pine, Pinus pinea
- Phoenicean juniper, Juniperus phoenicea L.
- Topped lavender, Lavandula stoechas
- Rosemary, Rosmarinus officinalis
- Shrubby sea-blite, Suaeda vera
- Picris, Picris wilkommi

In this area there is also the maritime juniper, Juniperus oxycedrus subsp. macrocarpa, a shrub endemic to Andalusia and present only in Huelva and Cadiz. Harvest of any plant is not permitted in this natural park. Extraneous species and species not specific to the marsh are not described.

== Fauna ==
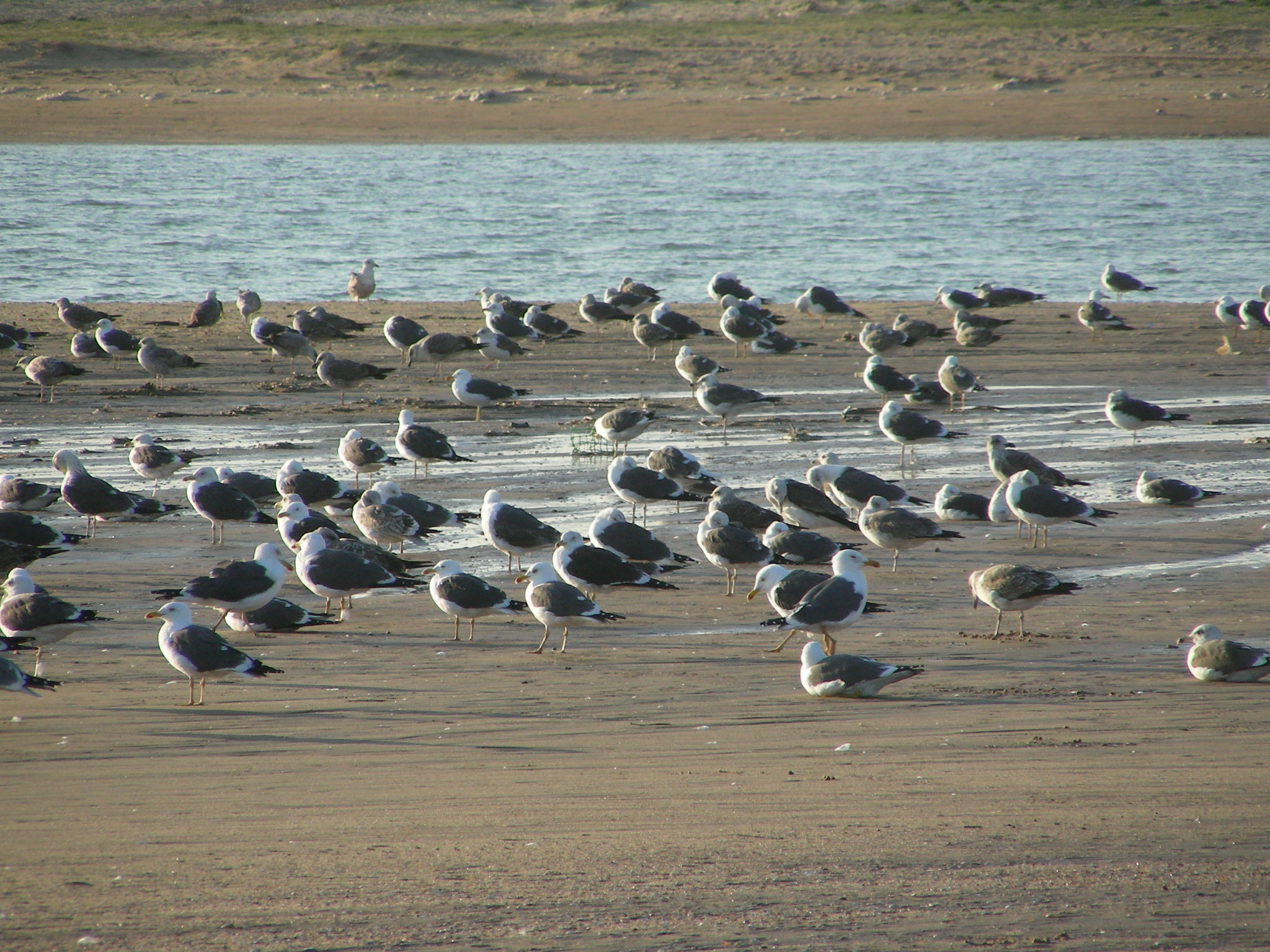
Gulls in the marshes

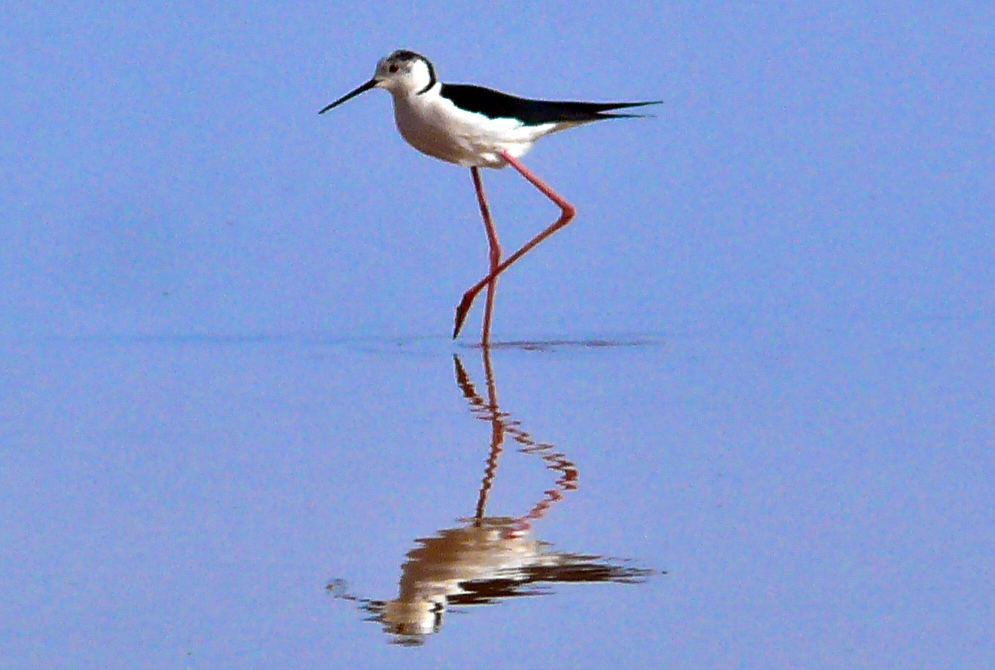
Black-winged stilt in Isla Cristina marshes

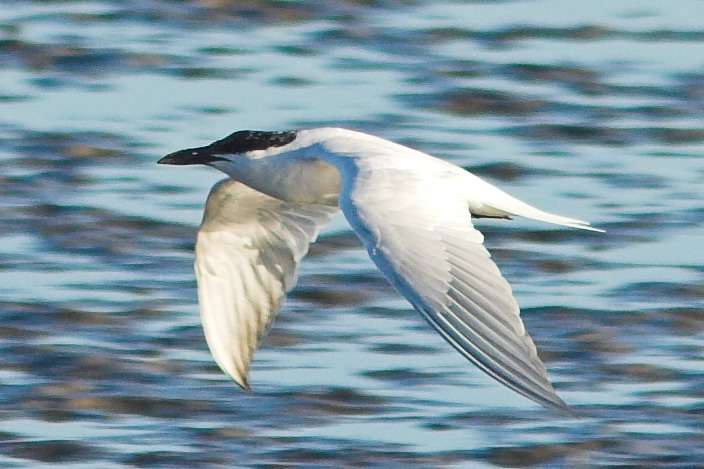
Gull-billed tern (Gelochelidon nilotica), one of the species most representative of this marsh

Natterjack Toad calling

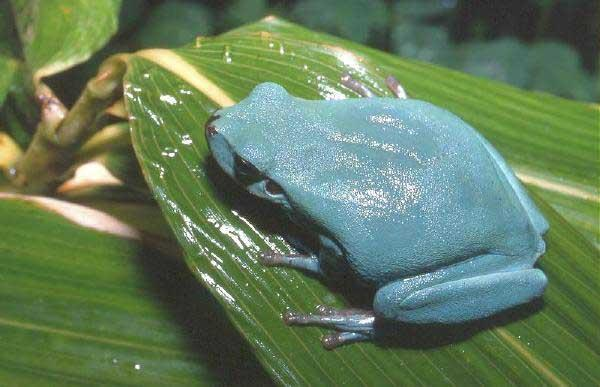
Mediterranean tree frog

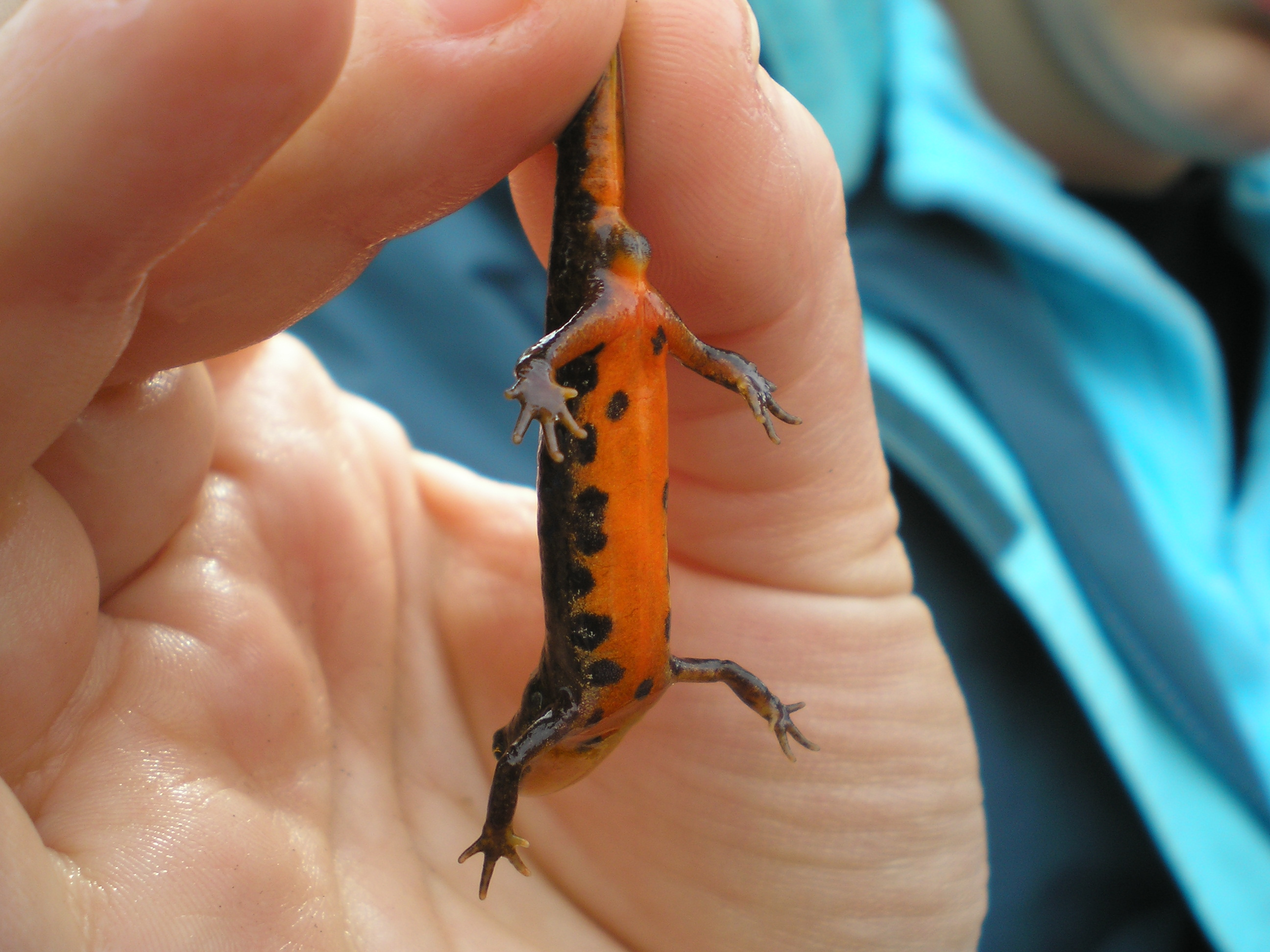
Ventral surface of Lissotriton boscai

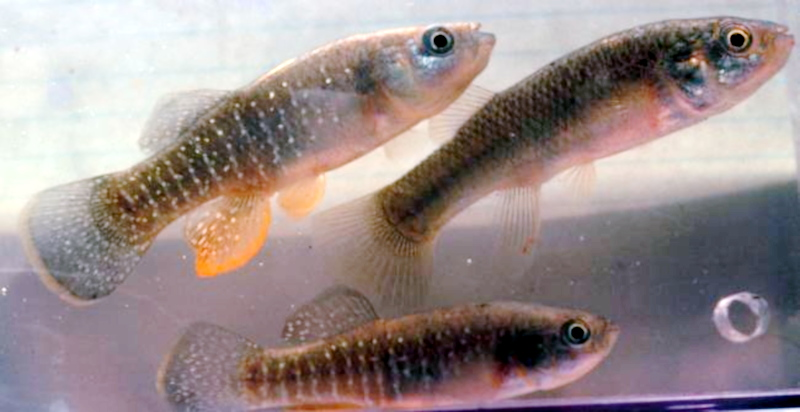
Mummichogs

Many animals are present in the Marismas de Isla Cristina.

=== Birds ===
The birds most representative of the marshes are : spatulas, storks and terns.

There are species that choose the marsh as wintering grounds, while others use it during the summer. Other species use the marches as their habitat during the entire year. To know which species use the marshes for the entire year, or which migratory birds spend only one season there, see the bird appendix (es:Anexo:Aves de las Marismas de Isla Cristina).

=== Amphibians ===
The amphibious fauna of the marsh are salamanders, frogs, and toads.

- Iberian midwife toad, Alytes cisternasii
- Common toad, Bufo bufo
- Natterjack toad, Epidalea calamita or Bufo calamita
- Iberian painted frog, Discoglossus galganoi
- Mediterranean tree frog, Hyla meridionalis
- Iberian spadefoot toad, Pelobates cultripes
- Iberian green frog, Rana perezi
- Fire salamander, Salamandra salamandra (subespecies VU o LRnt)
- Iberian ribbed newt, Pleurodeles waltl
- Bosca's newt, Triturus boscai LRnt
- Southern marbled newt, Triturus pygmaeus

=== Continental fish ===
The majority form part of the diet for birds. Because they do not have much economic interest, they are not commonly known by their common names. The fish that live in the shelter of the marshes are:

- Sea lamprey, Petromyzon marinus
- allis shad, Alosa alosa
- Iberian barbel, Barbus comizo
- Barbus microcephalus
- Andalusian barbel, Barbus sclateri
- Chondrostoma lemmingii
- Chondrostoma willkommii (a ray-finned Cyprinidae)
- Squalius alburnoides (a Cyprinidae)
- Cobitis paludica (a species of ray-finned Cobitidae)
- Mummichog, Fundulus heteroclitus

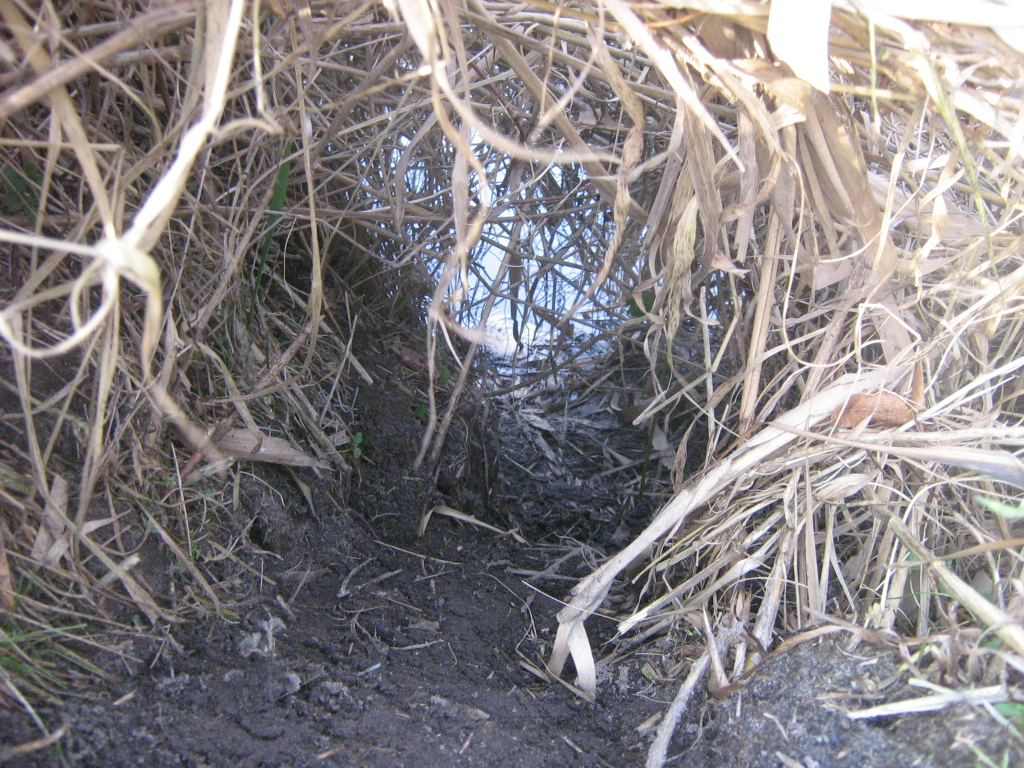
Typical work of otter

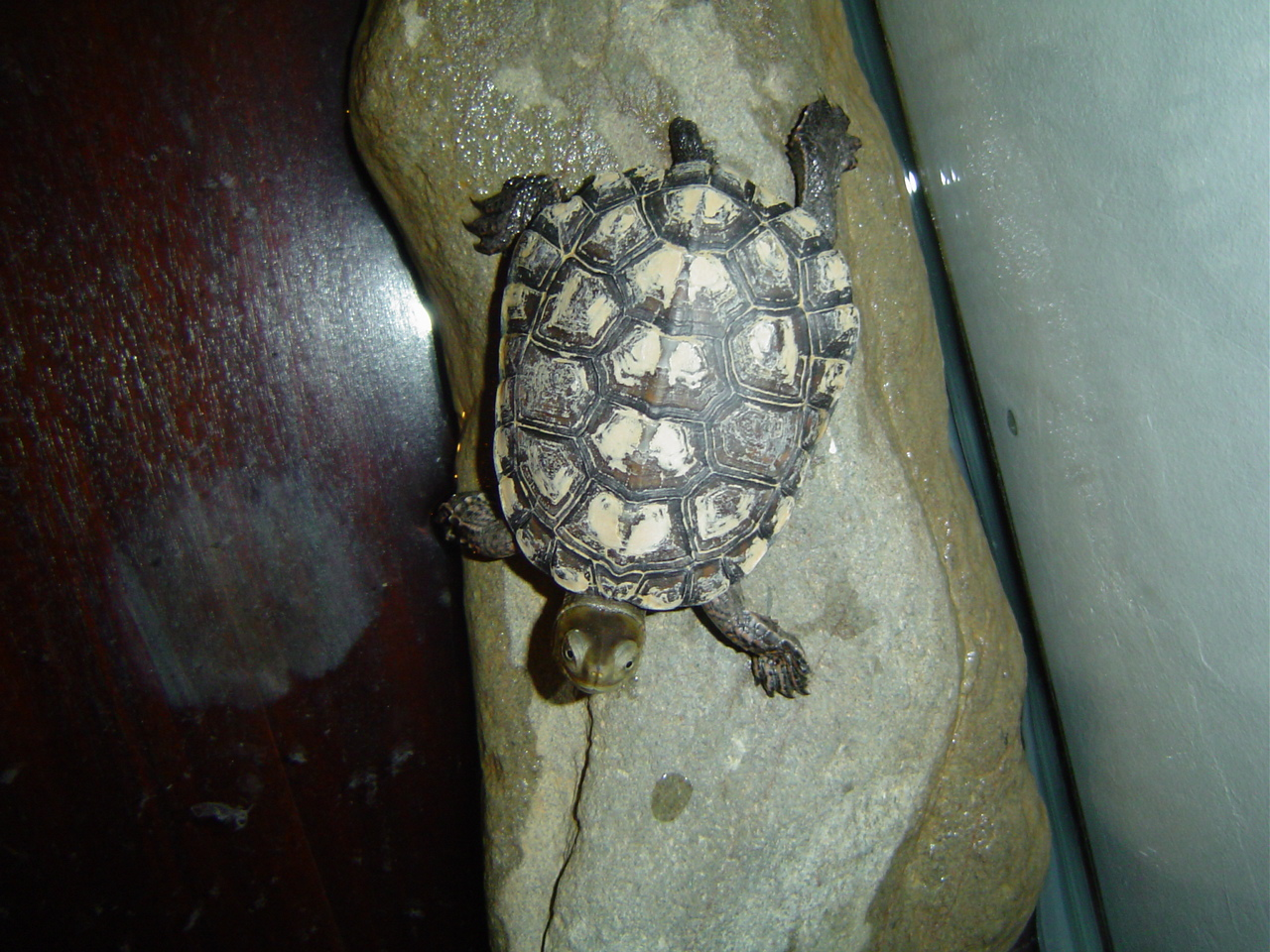
Mauremys leprosa

=== Reptiles ===
One species exists, the freshwater/sea turtle Mauremys leprosa or Spanish pond turtle. Its activity is very low and it is not commonly seen.

=== Mammals ===
The only native species to the Cristina Island marshes is the otter (lutra lutra). Although other rat species (Ondatra zibethicus or muskrat) and mice can be present, they don't exactly belong to this ecosystem.

== See also ==
- Natural park (Spain)
