= Amblypalpis tamaricella =

Scientific classification
- Domain: Eukaryota
- Kingdom: Animalia
- Phylum: Arthropoda
- Class: Insecta
- Order: Lepidoptera
- Family: Gelechiidae
- Genus: Amblypalpis
- Species: A. tamaricella

Binomial name
- Amblypalpis tamaricella Danilevsky, 1955

Species of moth

Amblypalpis tamaricella is a species of moth in the family Gelechiidae. It was described by Aleksandr Sergeievich Danilevsky in 1955. It is found in Central Asia, where it has been recorded from Kazakhstan and western China. The habitat consists of riparian forests and deserts.

The larvae have been recorded inducing galls on Tamarix species.
