= Port of Isla Cristina =

Port in Huelva, Andalusia

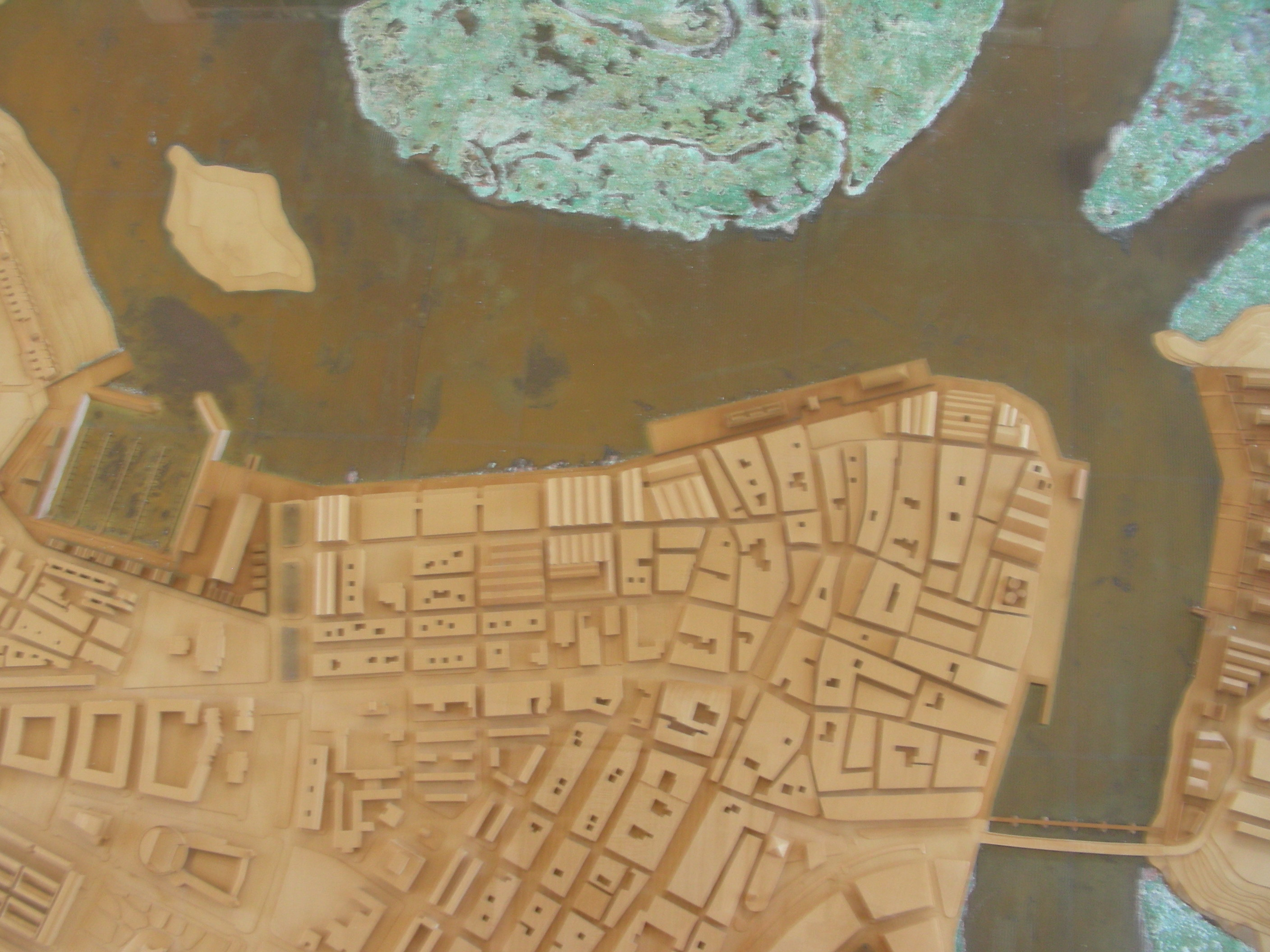
- Port area with the shipyards on the north bank (on the right)
- Interactive map of Port of Isla Cristina

Location
- Country: Spain
- Location: Isla Cristina
- Coordinates: 37.2°N 7.316667°W

Details
- Opened: 1755
- Operated by: Agencia Pública de Puertos de Andalucía
- Type of harbour: Maritime
- Size of harbour: 640,000 m²
- Land area: 2000 m
- Activities: Fishing, industrial and sports.
- Nautical chart: 440, 440A
- Scope: National

Statistics
- Website; Source: EPPA (in Spanish)

Password of the maritime province of Huelva.

The port of Isla Cristina (Spanish: Puerto de Isla Cristina), belonging to the maritime province of Huelva on the Spanish Costa de la Luz, is the port with the highest turnover in fresh fish in Andalusia and one of the first in tonnage and importance of catches at national level. It is one of the 23 main fishing ports in Spain designated by the FAO. It exports its products to all of Spain and much of Europe. It was originally developed as a way to support the fishing activity of the first settlers in the area in the 18th century. It has grown steadily in extension, reaching over 640,000 m² (64 ha) in 2009 after its latest expansion, although not in terms of the landing of catches. The 1920s marked the highest number of fish landed with almost 16,000 tons in a single year, highlighting the tuna almadraba. As a sardine port it has been, for decades, one of the first in Spain and the traditional species of the port.

The modernization of the fleet and the search for new fishing techniques have been a constant during its development, introducing innovations at a national level in fishing gear such as the tarrafa, at the end of the 19th century. Already in the 20th century, the reconversion of the sector reduced the importance of the port to give it to fish farms, while R&D activity was added to the sector with innovation centers such as CIT-Garum.

== History through fishing ==
=== Background and beginnings ===
Initially, around 1724, a rudimentary port in the area of the "Barra de la Tuta" for mooring and landing of goods was the logical and necessary consequence of the arrival, from the early years of the 18th century (perhaps earlier), of fishing artisans from the Levante and even France. These fishermen were attracted by the fishing of sardines and tuna mainly, and other species of commercial interest, returning after the season to their ports of origin.

This periodic transfer of seasonal workers marks the moment when fishing activity began on the Barra de la Tuta. Until the 1750s, the fisheries developed in the area in the form of colonies with frequent summer activity, dependent on the ports of origin in the Spanish Levante. Over time and thanks to the abundance of resources and the need to establish a more secure port, these colonies became stable ports with a permanent population. This was the origin of towns such as Punta del Moral, La Higuerita (renamed in 1834 as Isla Cristina) or Punta del Caimán (currently a suburb of Isla Cristina). The 1755 Lisbon earthquake is the milestone that provoked the need to settle in a point conveniently protected from natural hazards and, incidentally, to look for a place where to obtain better tax conditions. The place chosen was the island of La Higuerita, protected by a sandy coastline, La Barra, a few hundred meters from La Tuta to the northeast, in the area of marismas and estuaries existing between Ayamonte and La Redondela, and free, at least in principle, from the aforementioned tributary administrations. These conditions made this island the ideal place to which the bulk of the settlements would be moved.

=== Commercial independence and fishing between the 18th and 19th centuries ===
Its protected strategic location, along with some political events promoted by the Marquis of Pombal in Portugal (see history of Vila Real de Santo António) and thanks to jurisdictional concessions from Charles III, led to a strong development of fishing activity in this port from the early years of its formation.

At the end of the 18th century, the number of traditional boats was still important, with more than 60 jábegas (the largest traditional fishing boat in the area). However, 30 years later, in 1824, there were only between 24 and 26 jábegas in the province of Huelva, of which between 18 and 20 belonged to the port of Isla Cristina. The jábegas were the main means for catching sardines, a species that stands out especially in this port. The bous gear brought by Valencian fishermen to the Gulf of Cadiz, which was not very selective due to trawling, ruined the traditional activities (among them, the aforementioned jábegas), although they continued to be used (like gillnetting, still in use) and caused the abandonment of a large number of traditional fishermen at this time.

There was one or at most two almadrabas in the coasts of Huelva, which alternated or contemporaneously, were the almadraba of La Tuta and La Mojarra. Even at this time there was no demand for further progress in these modern methods of extraction, as they were technically expensive and costly, making the art of the almadraba still unprofitable for a society that was not prepared for it because of the intricacies of the guilds and inadequate regulations. The catches of these almadraba gave more supply than the population needed to consume and in some occasions they were unprofitable.0

=== Industrialization ===
With the arrival of the canning industry, demand increased enormously, since the fish did not need to be consumed immediately, but could be preserved, stored and transported long distances for later consumption. Little by little, the situation changed and in 1861 the catches achieved in 1831 were tripled.

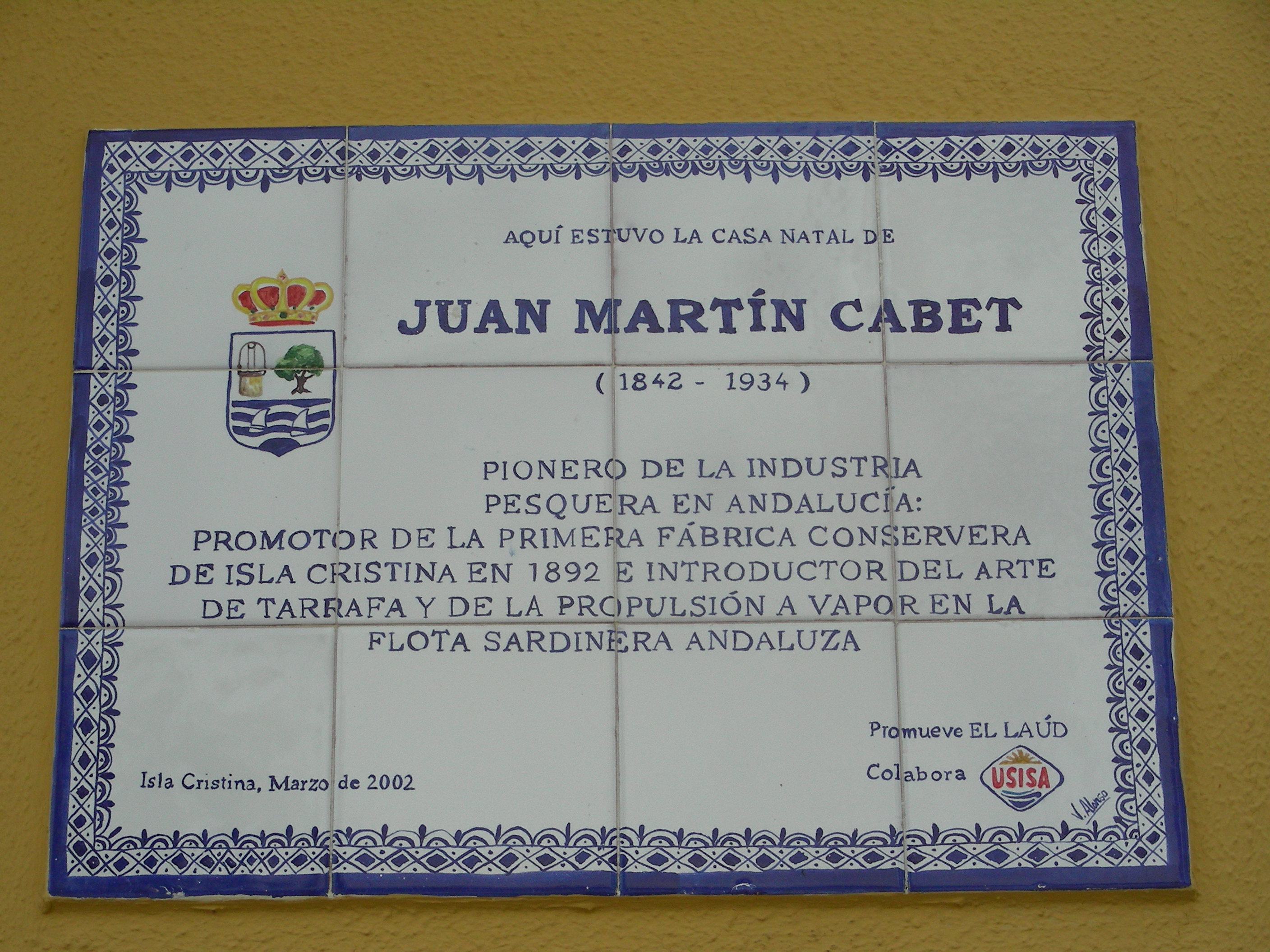
Plaque in memory of Juan Martín Cabet, who brought several fishing technologies to Andalusia.

Around 1865, the galleon (known in Galicia as traíña) arrived from Galicia, (Note: The first galleon was brought by the salted fish industrialist from Isla Cristina, Sebastián Romeu Casañes, who created one of the most important canning companies of the entire South Atlantic coast, especially strengthened by his son and heir, Serafín Romeu Portas, first Count of Barbate and Manager of the Consorcio Nacional Almadrabero after its incorporation in 1928.) which would eventually replace the jábegas, even with resistance from its former users, thanks to a more entrepreneurial conception of the sector, the disestablishment of salt as a state monopoly and a bonanza in the fishing industry in those years. This business conception grew in complexity, exploited intensive fishing more and more, and triggered a conflict of interests with Portugal (since the galleons, with their freedom of movement, allowed them to move away from the coast) that would not be overcome until the European fishing framework came into force.

It was a salting businessman from Isla Cristina, Martín Cabet, the promoter of a new gear that he adapted to the galleon brought to Spain by himself from Boston, the tarrafa (purse seine gear dedicated to catching sardines). Martin Cabet adapted it perfectly to the ship, propelled by oars (and later adapted it for steam propulsion) and with its larger dimensions, better maneuverability and allowing sets in deeper waters, it will overcome the restrictions imposed by Portugal in its jurisdictional waters without violating the 1883 treaty, fishing in its own waters without navigating them. In other parts of the province, it was preferred to trade with Portuguese sardines instead of fishing them, which reduced the dynamism and prevented the modernization of those ports, in addition to the risks involved, since Portugal also had an important canning industry.

=== Relaunching of the almadraba ===
Of the first almadrabas, (Note: There are documents that recognize the installation of almadrabas on the coast of Onuba during the Roman administration. Subsequently, the art was lost and was not recovered until the Middle Ages, when the Duke of Medina Sidonia was granted a monopoly in the Gulf of Cadiz for the creation of eight almadrabas, two of which will eventually fall on the coast of La Higuerita competition. After the end of the monopoly, the almadrabas were managed by the almadraba guilds of the 19th century, which finally formed the Consorcio Nacional Almadrabero, whose first president was the islander Serafín Romeu, and whose dissolution took place in 1973.) granted in monopoly in the 13th century to the Duke of Medina Sidonia, the almadraba of La Tuta, dating from 1812, was the most constant. By 1888 there were at least two in Isla Cristina, the aforementioned and that of Las Cabezas, set that same year, in addition to the almadraba of La Mojarra which ceased to be set. At the end of the century, the sardine became more important than tuna; however, Isla Cristina still contributed more than 91% of the total catch of the province of Huelva in 1892 (5,598,075 kilos without counting the tuna).

In the 1880s, the greatest activity related to fishing took off, the tuna almadraba and the canning industry linked to it, which reached its splendor in the 1920s. At that time, the port of Isla Cristina had managed to agglutinate before it a stable population of 10,000 inhabitants (comparable at the time with cities like Avilés or Irun) and had experienced a strong industrialization of fishing activities associated, producing tuna alone, several thousand kilos per day and generating thousands of jobs directly or indirectly, besides having real industrial colonies in several points of the coast of the Gulf of Cadiz (concentrated in a few families), as was the case of Rota, with factories of up to 600 people of the Zamorano and Romeu families. The almadraba business began to transcend the local or regional sphere of influence, with most of the almadrabas in the gulf and several Moroccan ones passing into the hands of industrialists from the island (and also from Ayamonte).

=== Blue Gold; tuna as the main source of wealth ===
The technological development of the time largely permitted this economic flourishing based on tuna, as described by Bellón in 1926:

...the great development acquired in our country by the tuna industry as the canning procedures have been perfected and the means of communication have improved, opening new markets for consumption, has been reflected in the factories, which have gone from being simple salting pans, with rudimentary material, to become magnificent installations, where modern energy sources and mechanical wonders are put to use.

— Bellón, 1926

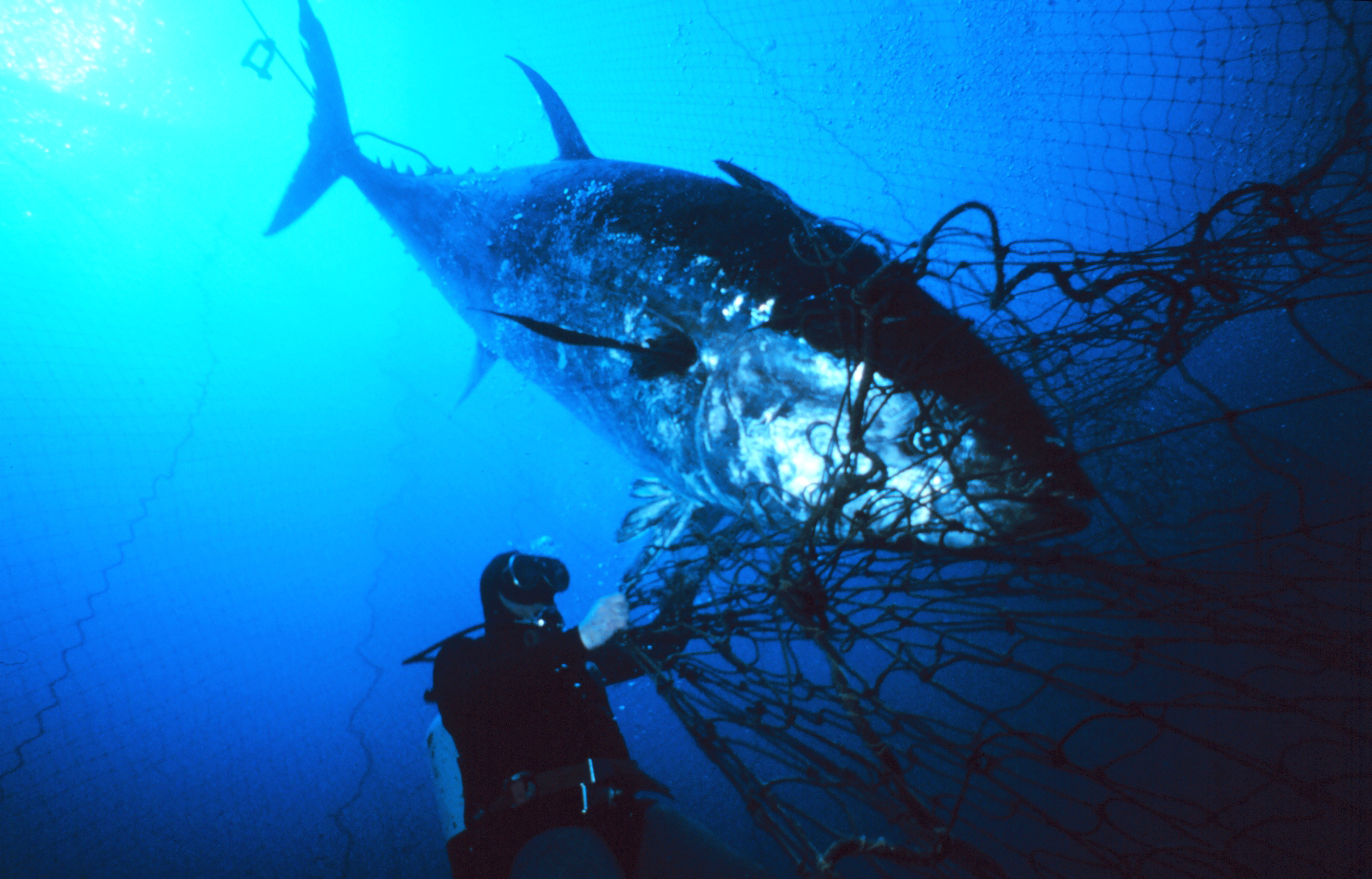
For decades, tuna has been the mainstay of the port in terms of market price and landed weight. Since the end of the 20th century, seafood and fish farm products have taken over.

This development refers mainly to the industrialization of canning (mainly tuna canning, but also sardines) and took place mainly in the factories of Serafín Romeu and Pérez y Feu in Isla Cristina and the latter also in Ayamonte. The price of the technology at the time was somewhat negligible, if we compare it with the costs of the canon or the replacement of the material of the almadraba. In the 1910s, the labor force was reduced due to the mechanization of the almadraba boats, which lowered production costs. Taking into account that the years of the First World War and the post-war period were years of a strong increase in exports and in which the prices of canned tuna suffered strong rises, the investment in infrastructures and the improvement of the facilities were necessary and convenient.

Of the four large canning companies in the Gulf of Cadiz, which accounted for practically the entire national sector; Viuda de Zamorano, Serafín Romeu, José Ramón Curbera and Compañía Almadrabera Española, the first two were from the islands. (Note: The factories in Tarifa and Barbate canned impressive quantities of tuna caught by line in the strait.) These companies were a clear example of a corporate group, controlling the entire process from extraction. The average daily production capacity of the Cádiz almadraba-canning companies, that is, canned tuna (generally in the hands of businessmen from Isla Cristina or Ayamonte) exceeded 50,000 kg. in addition to a similar amount of salted tuna. In a single campaign they could produce up to 15,000 tunas (approximately 1,200,000 kilograms of canned tuna). In addition, the industrial colonies owned by Viuda de Zamorano and Romeu had schools, a small hospital, a commissary, lodgings; a whole city to house sometimes more than 600 workers and their families in the Real de las almadrabas.

The following table illustrates the years of greatest fishing activity and the beginning of its decline. In comparison, in 2008 almost 7,700,000 kilos passed through the Llotja. The data on landed fish have reached our days thanks to the fact that they were published at the time in the island newspaper La Higuerita.

The blue gold era
Year	Fish catch in kilograms
1919	12,204,500
1920	10,826,000
1921	13,644,000
1922	11,750,000
1923	15,621,500
1924	9,194,500
Source: Origins of Industrial Fishing in the province of Huelva. Segundo Ríos.

The work continued to be very seasonal (intensive fishing), and each worker and his family had to travel in summer to work in the cannery. However, Isla Cristina, and Huelva in general (traditional production sites) gradually lost importance and production moved to Cadiz. This was due to the 1914 war, the closing of the Portuguese tuna import market, the increase in the capacity of the Cadiz factories and the decrease in the productivity of the island's almadrabas (in the province of Huelva, between 1922 and 1923, more than 30,000 tuna weighing more than 100 kg were caught, down to only 10,000). Huelva did not reach the degree of concentration that Cadiz had.

=== Alteration of fishing grounds ===
Andalusian tuna was increasingly in demand, exporting almost 5,000 tons of tuna due to the exhaustion of the almadrabas in Portugal and Italy and the low production in other countries with which it could compete, so that the protectionist tariff policies of these demanding countries began to change. At the beginning of the 1920s, almost all the tuna production from the Gulf of Cadiz was sent to Italy, covering only 15% of its annual demand of 40,000 MT.

In the mid 1920s, the Gulf almadrabas industries, in order not to suffer due to the decrease in catches, had to be reduced. Previously it had affected the production centers of the neighboring countries, so it was clear that it was a structural situation and not a conjunctural one. The Isla Cristina businessmen decided to keep the factories in the province of Cadiz due to their higher yield, favored by the lower costs and low taxes (ROE was, for fresh tuna, at 6,000 catches in Isla Cristina, compared to only 3,000 for the port of Rota). The business became more complicated in these years, and the Chamber of Commerce of Huelva was forced to establish measures against the excessive canon that was paid by some traps boats in Isla Cristina, so that it was regulated to pay per catch, instead of paying a fixed amount, as it had been doing, and at the same time the industrial contribution was abolished. However, the state refused to lose its participation and rents continued to rise. With this, the contribution of the Huelva coast was reduced to only 30% of Andalusian production compared to the remaining 70% concentrated in the province of Cadiz.

Despite the debacle of the almadraba, Isla Cristina was still an important sardine port, as attested by sources of the time:

Isla Cristina is currently one of our most important fishing ports in Spain, which is only rivaled by some of the northwest coasts; it is certainly the most exclusively fishing of all.

— Bellón, 1926

=== End of the almadraba ===
After the disappearance of the almadrabas that belonged to the Duke of Medina-Sidonia, these were exploited by the Consorcio Nacional Almadrabero, founded in 1928, with headquarters first in Tarifa and later in Isla Cristina, of which Serafín Romeu Portas was its president. On January 18, 1973, the Consorcio Nacional Almadrabero decided to liquidate the company, which led to the closure of the almadrabas in the province of Huelva (all in Isla Cristina) and Almeria, and recently, thanks to the recovery of the species in the Gulf of Cadiz, there is speculation that in the 2020s there will be a new almadraba in Isla Cristina.

=== The fleet in the second half of the 20th century ===
After the Civil War and as a consequence of the decline of the tuna sector, shipowners looked beyond the coast of the gulf. Thanks to the technological improvement that brought new boats with more autonomy, Isla Cristina built the fleet called Agadir, with more than 250 gross registered tons (GRT), whose purpose was precisely to fish in the waters of the African fishing grounds, abandoning the steam propulsion of the old ones. Since then, deep-sea fishing has been the main business of the port, developing the activity in fishing grounds such as those of Mauritania or Senegal. This intensive exploitation of remote fishing grounds was the consequence of greater Portuguese opposition to fishing in their waters, something that would also affect the Portuguese fleet, since both fleets fished on both sides of the Spanish-Portuguese border. In the end, this need to fish thousands of kilometers away put an end to most of the traditional activity of Isla Cristina, and increased the decline that had already begun with the decrease in catches in the almadrabas.

At the end of the 20th century, with a diminished artisanal activity and the catches in West African fishing grounds, large refrigerated vessels of more than a thousand tons of thrust arrived, preparing the catch in situ for its arrival in port weeks in advance. The business model of the shipowners had to change due to the fishing periods, much longer than the traditional coastal navigation: the freezer ships of the Canary-Saharan fishing grounds call into port every 15 days for the purse seiners and every 40 days for the trawlers.

On the other hand, thanks to the rise of Isla Cristina in the past, the market price of its Llotja continued to report benefits, registering market values higher than those of neighboring ports. However, the number of catches has not always increased with technological advances, although the first years of the 21st century have seen an increase in catches. These technological advances have allowed to derive part of the fishing business to fish farms and aquaculture, which are on the rise, establishing in early 2009 a group of pontoons for the breeding of mussels as a milestone in its development.

== Urban development of the port ==
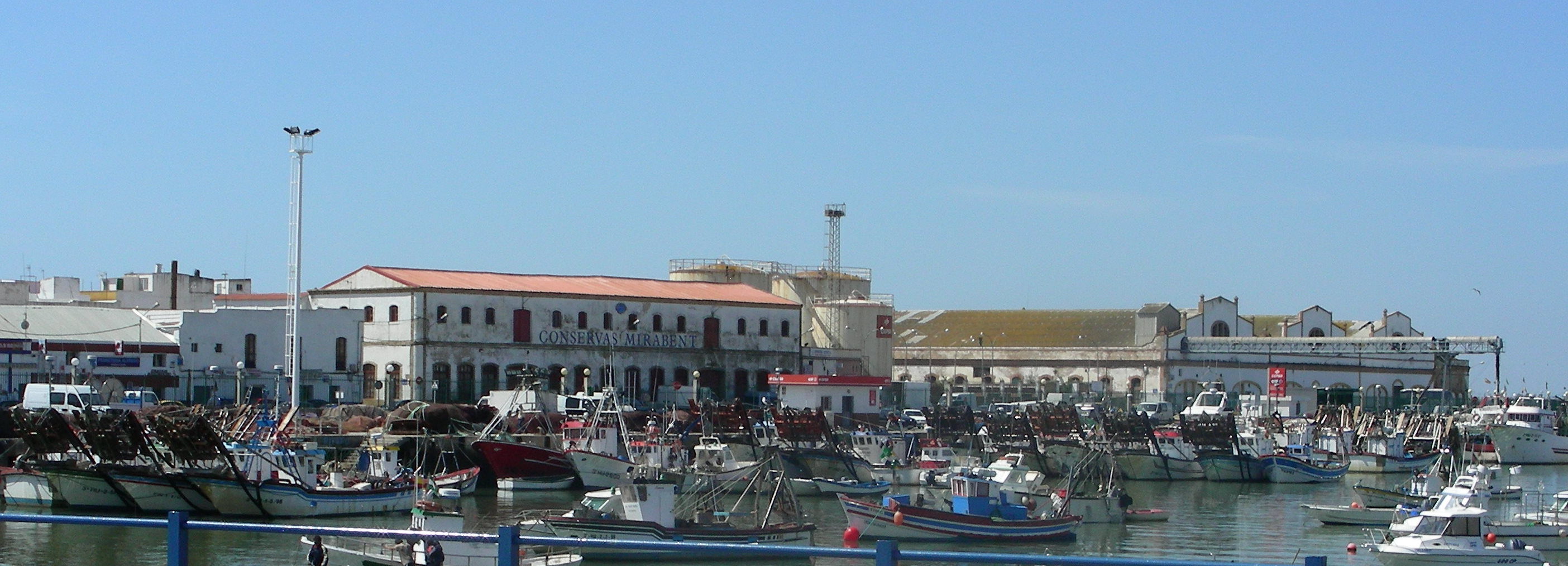
Muelle Marina and the salted fish factories of the early 20th century from the Puente Infanta Cristina.

Going back to the dawn of the 18th century, it can be seen that there were several points where fresh fish was collected and the initial salting treatments were carried out for transport to the main ports of origin (mainly the Spanish Levante) of the vessels that fished along this coast.

After the 1755 Lisbon earthquake, the stable settlement of the island of La Higuerita began, where the port is located (currently the island is joined to the mainland by a narrow margin of land) to better serve the port's vessels and attend to its facilities all year round (according to Mirabent, the first group of settlers was the Faneca family with Josep Faneca, from Mataró, as the first stable guard of the warehouses and port facilities).

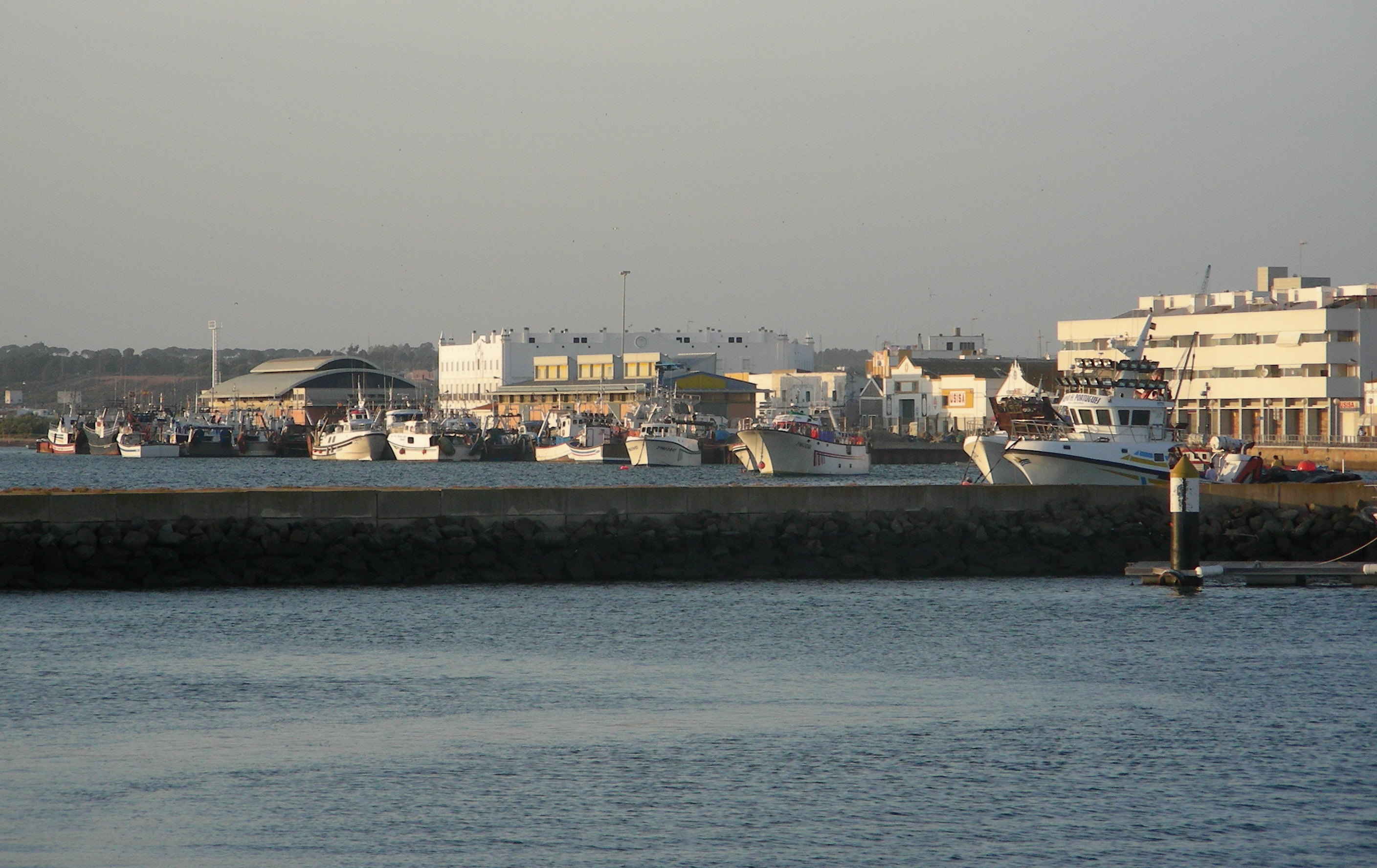
General view of the Muelle Martínez Catena and the Llotja buildings from the marina.

Initially, in the middle of the 18th century, the dock was reduced to the west side, known as the Muelle Martínez Catena, where a small wooden pier was provided for the docking of a few ships. This was the first pier to be built on the island. Later it was extended until it was linear to the line of houses on the shore, then separated by a beach area. Later, in the 19th century, the same was done in the northern area, calling this Muelle Marina.

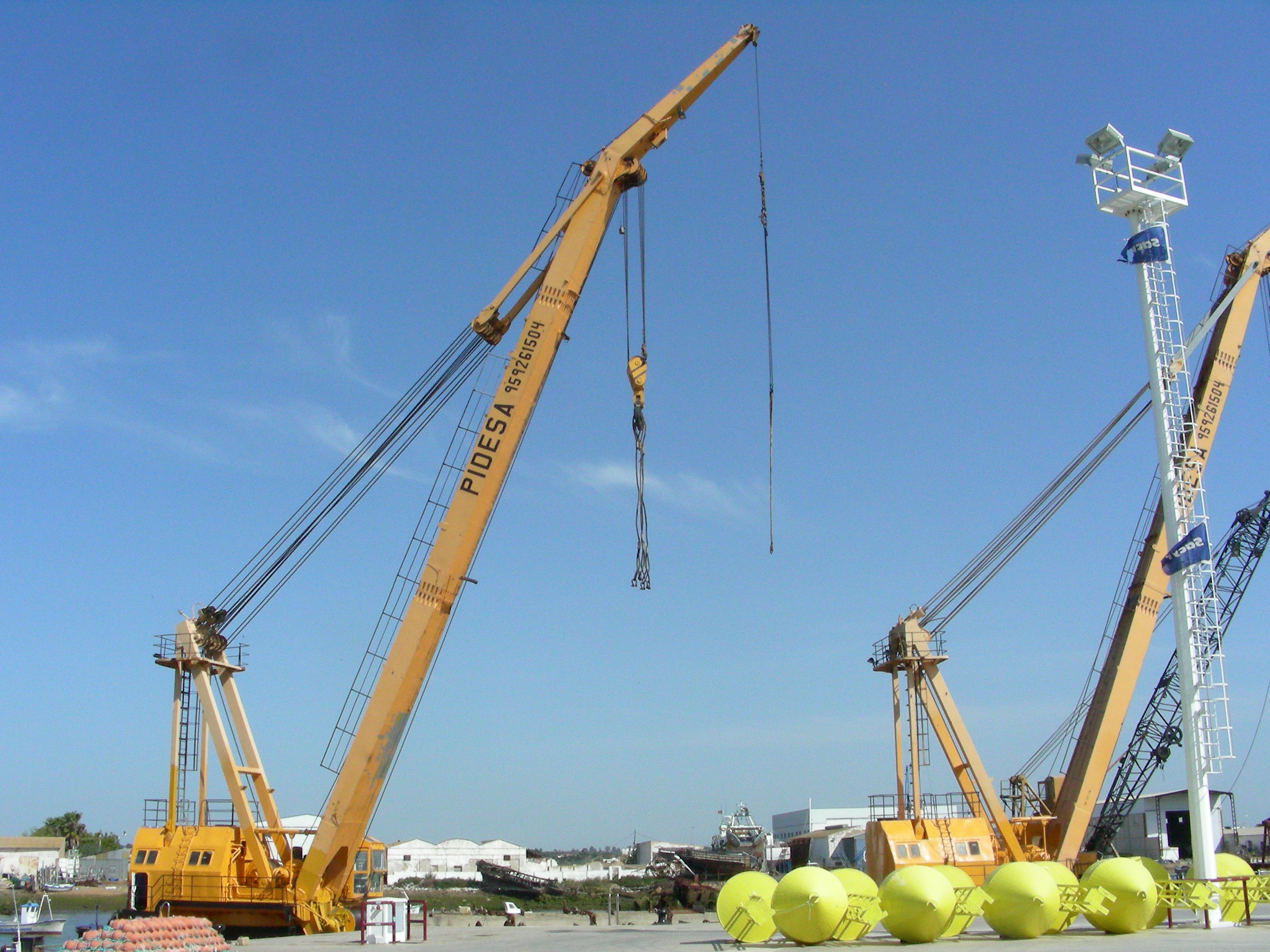
Cranes for large cargo handling maneuvers in the latest expansion of the port, between the Muelle Martínez Catena and Muelle Marina in early 2009.

Already in the 20th century, in an area of about 50 m² reclaimed from the sea of the Muelle Martínez Catena, the port authority's hut was built. Later, in the western area of the Muelle Marina, the enclosure that would prevent the sale of fish in squares, such as Las Flores, the "new" Llotja (lota, as this building is still known, a derivation of the Catalan Llotja) was built on land reclaimed from the sea. The Muelle Marina was finally extended to its modern configuration: about 40 meters were gained back towards the estuary. Subsequently, the same was done in the southern part of the Muelle Catena. In the second half of the 20th century, a new Llotja building was created in the northern part of the Muelle Martínez Catena, which was improved at the end of the 20th century by building an extension in the southern part of the Muelle Catena and rebuilding the old Llotja in the northern part of the wharf. The part of the Muelle Marina that had not yet been extended, from its eastern end to the Puente Infanta Cristina, was incorporated into the port at the turn of the millennium. At the same time, around the mid-1990s, the entire port area was fenced off. It was at this time that EPPA (Empresa Pública de Puertos de Andalucía) took over the administration of the port of Isla Cristina.

After the approval of the PGOU of 1987, preparations began for the construction, in the neighborhood of Punta del Caimán, of a marina with capacity for 204 berths and more than 50,000 m² of surface area. In 2007 it was finally decided to enlarge it as a consequence of the enormous demand for moorings in this port, with more than 6 years of waiting for its adjudication.

Finally, in the 2007–08 biennium, the port was expanded again, gaining the sea the elbow section that separated the two docks. The total surface area of the Isla Cristina fishing port exceeded 640,000 m² in April 2009.

== The fishing port today ==
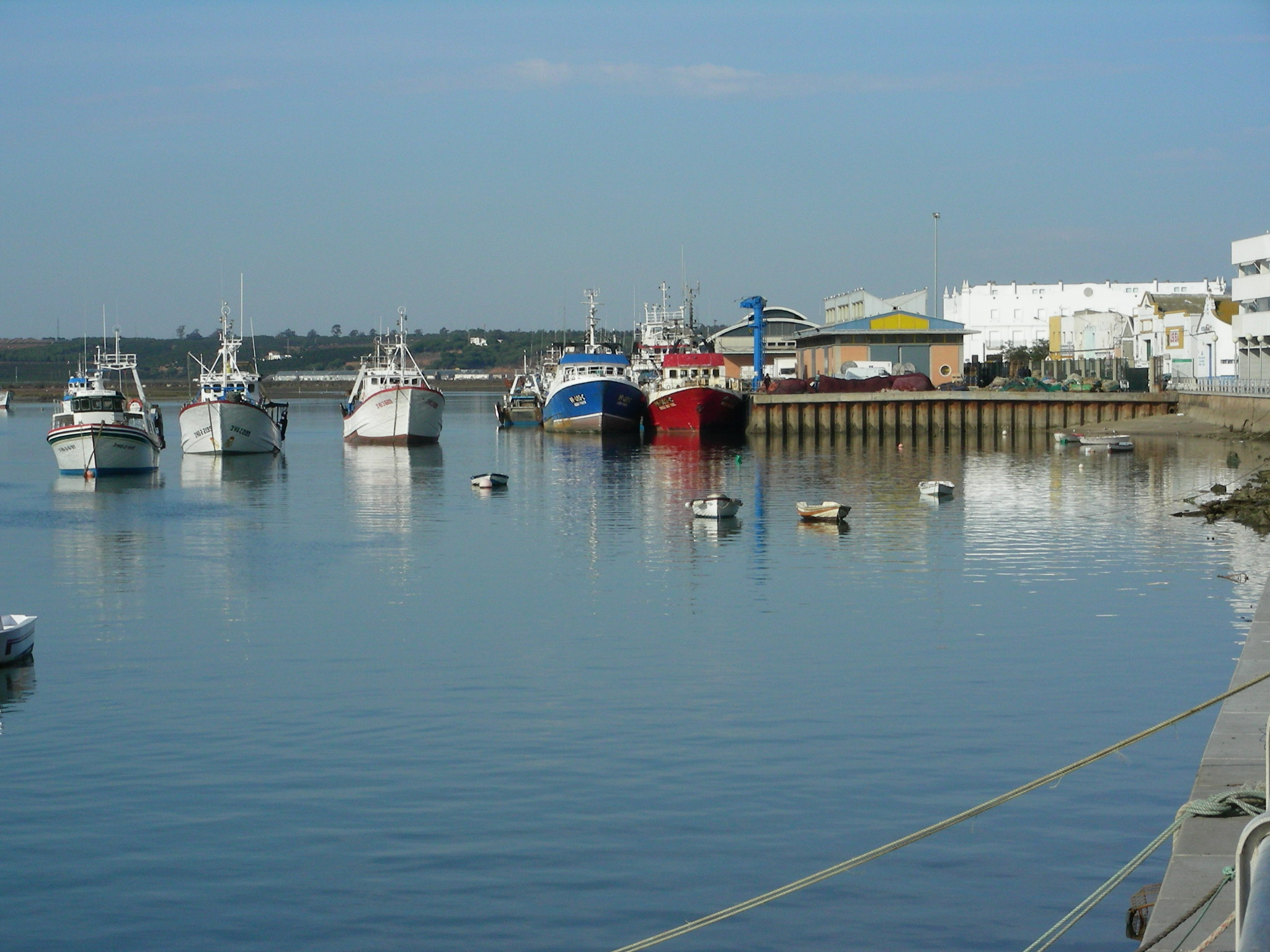
Muelle Martínez Catena and one of the Llotja buildings in the foreground of the wharf.

The port has a Llotja that serves the island fleet as well as vessels from nearby base ports, such as Ayamonte and some Portuguese ones, mainly. The fleet based in the port represents more than 22,000 gross registered tons and is composed of about 250 vessels, with an average of 88 GRT, with a significant employment rate, in addition, indirectly hosts an important secondary or processing sector that includes several thousand jobs. (Note: In the total of the fleet of the Gulf of Cadiz, Isla Cristina represents 36% of the fleet of fluke (with 46 vessels and followed by Sanlucar de Barrameda with 24), and 47% of the total trawling fleet (90 of the 190 existing in the gulf and 110 in the province of Huelva). On the other hand, it should be remembered that the vessels with home port in Ayamonte disembark in the ports of Isla Cristina or Huelva and some Portuguese also do so in Isla Cristina. Thus, in Isla Cristina, 90 trawlers are registered (129 land in its fish market), about 50 purse seiners (data from the 1980s, currently higher due to its greater permissiveness against trawlers), 41 hydraulic dredgers and more than 80 traditional ones.)

The industrial port is the one with the highest turnover of fresh fish in Andalusia, reaching again in the first half of 2009 the second position as Andalusian producer and representing 54.4% of the operations in the Andalusian Llotjas together with Cadiz, Punta Umbria, Barbate and Caleta de Velez, one of the main fishing grounds, along with Agadir, already mentioned and still in operation, is that of Senegambia.

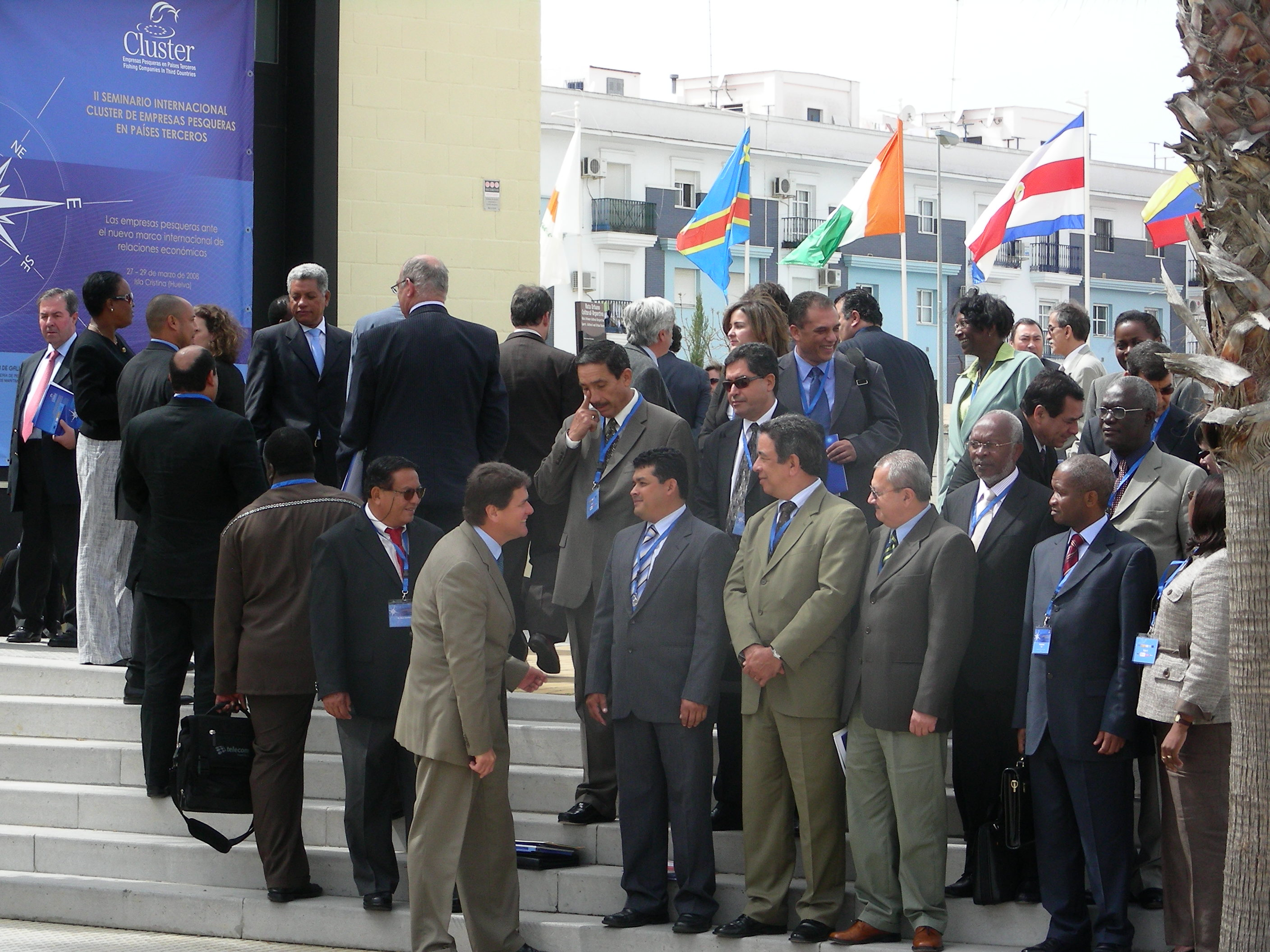
Photo of fishing authorities at the "Cluster of fishing companies in third countries".

=== Events ===
In the first years of the 21st century, large international events and fairs were held for the fishing-fish farming industry. Biannual international fairs were consolidated, such as FAMAR (Feria Andaluza del Mar), heir of FIMAR (Feria Internacional del Mar), with more involvement of the administrations than its predecessor. In 2008 the second meeting "Cluster of Fishing Companies in Third Countries" (Spanish: Cluster de Empresas Pesqueras en Terceros Países) was held, the first having been held in Baiona and bringing together in its second edition more than 30 speakers, including ministers of fisheries and representatives of the sector from as many countries.

=== Fisheries Innovation Center and factory relocation ===
The canning factories were moved to industrial estates on the outskirts in the early years of the 21st century, as a result of the implementation of special plans outside the current zoning plan, due to the need to rehabilitate the fishing area of the historic center for the citizens. Some factories that are still standing were reconverted for tertiary uses, such as the old Mirabent factory, where the Fishing Technology Innovation Center (CIT Garum) was built to offer advanced services in seafood technologies, process technologies and sustainability technologies to all fishing operators.

=== Catches ===
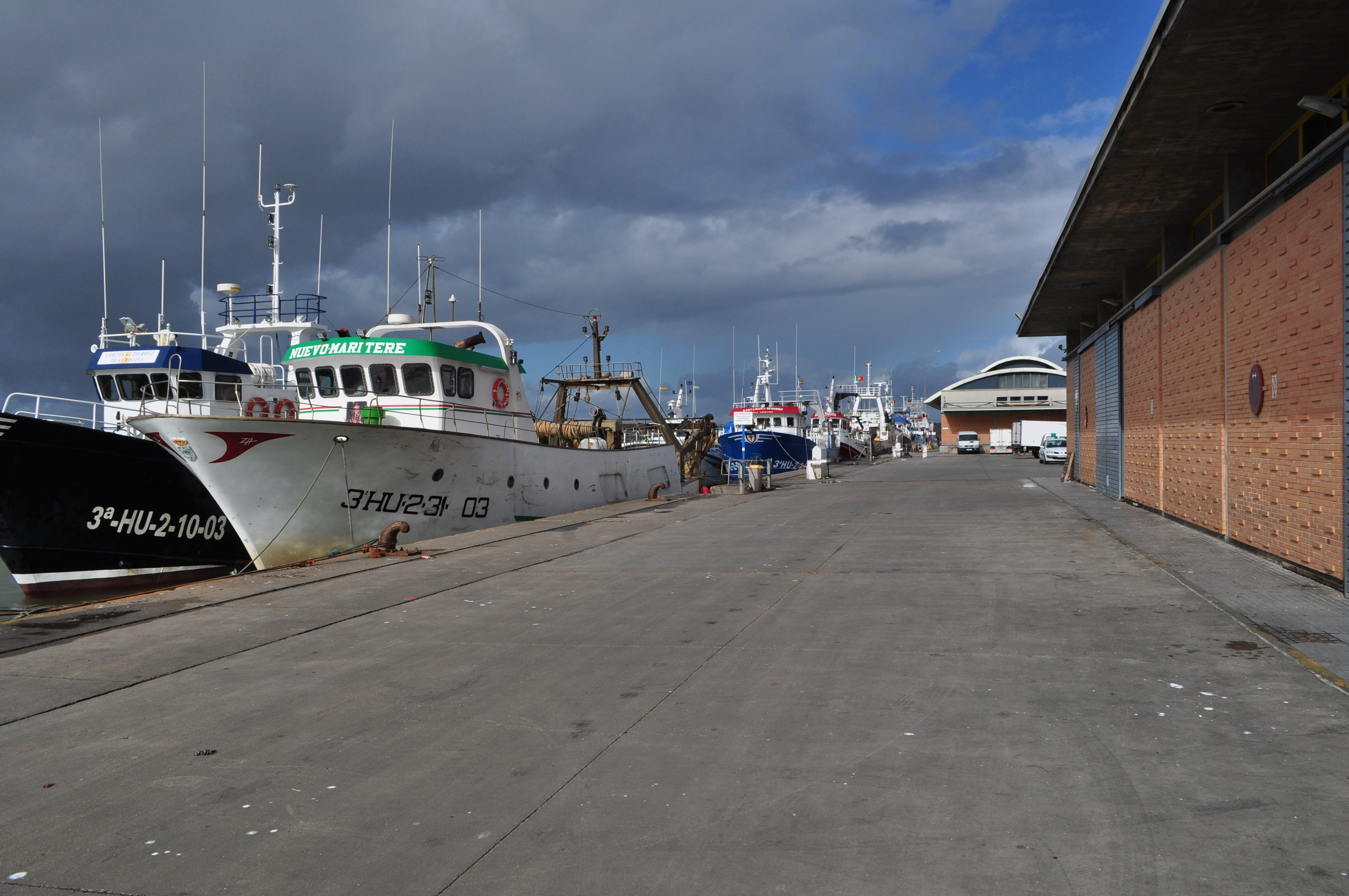
View of the Muelle Muelle Martínez Catena showing the two buildings of the Llotja and some ships docked under the Portuguese flag.

Being one of the main ports at national level in production, number of vessels and value of catches —over 20 million euros— it is necessary a business managem

ent of the Llotja (lota), in charge of it is the company Lonja de Isla Cristina S.L. In terms of production, Cadiz is the only port that exceeds in catches to Isla Cristina, although it is still the first in sales.

Although dozens of species are landed daily in this port, (Note: The most commonly caught species are: white shrimp, clams, scampi, crayfish, prawns, sole, hake, wedge sole, ginean mojarra, sardines, anchovies, mackerel, coquina clams and octopus. Other typical species of the area are: squid, cuttlefish, lobster, ray, seabream, sea robins, red mullet, gilthead bream and pandora.) located at the mouth of the Carreras estuary, the two main species are still the sardine (Sardina sp.) and the giant bluefin tuna (Thunnus thynnus), although the sea bream contributes at least half of the provincial total, which in turn represents a quota of 15% at the national level.

==== Tuna and sardines ====
The tuna, called by Strabo "sea pig" because it hardly has any waste and can exceed 200 kilograms. Its use is as follows: out of every 100 kilograms of gross weight, 61 kilograms of meat are obtained for salting and canning, 8 kilograms of other inferior meat that is not salted and 4 kilograms of mouths and intestines that are salted. The remaining 27 kilograms of offal —head, bones and fins— are used to produce guano, a type of fertilizer of which there are numerous factories on Isla Cristina itself and which in another era was even used to produce electricity. Both tuna and sardine were the first species in the port to be canned, in fact, the port is still one of the first in the country in sardine catches.

==== Other catches ====
In 2008 the Isla Cristina fishing fleet landed a total of 7,693 tons of fish and shellfish, with a first sale value of 21 million euros. By the volume of catches and their value, the landings of the purse seine fleet stand out, with half of the total catches and 16% of the value marketed; and trawling, with 29% of the volume and 65% of the value. On the other hand, the landings of fluke accounted for 15% of the volume of catches and 11% of the value marketed. These values leave the Vigo Llotja, another of the most important in Spain, at a certain distance. In 2009, fresh fish catches landed at the Llotja (excluding fish farm and marine farm products) were sold for a value of more than 26 million euros, 16.35% more than the previous year. In the month of January 2010, 500,000 kilos of fish entered the Llotja for a value of 2 million euros, which was two and a quarter times the weight compared to the same period of the previous year and twice its value.

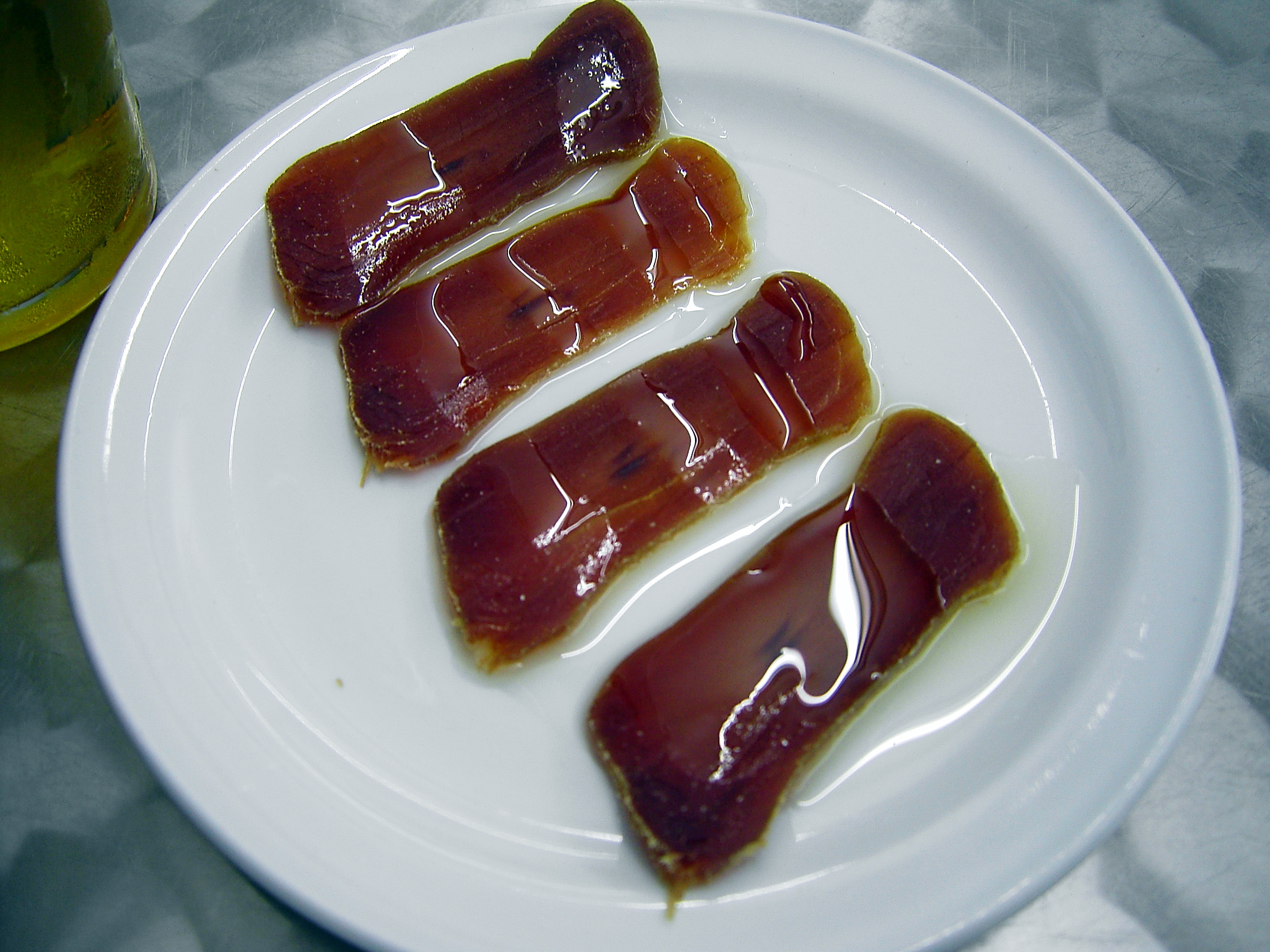
Tuna mojama from Isla Cristina, together with Barbate, its main producer.

=== Consortia and companies ===
- Lonja de Isla Cristina S.L.: Public company until March 1999, privatized by the city council to add competitiveness to its management, carried out in equal parts by the Isla Cristina Shipowners Association and the Fishermen's Guild. In its facilities are unloaded annually about 18 million kilos between sea fishing, aquaculture products and shellfish, 1.5% of national production, this generates a turnover of more than 20 million euros.
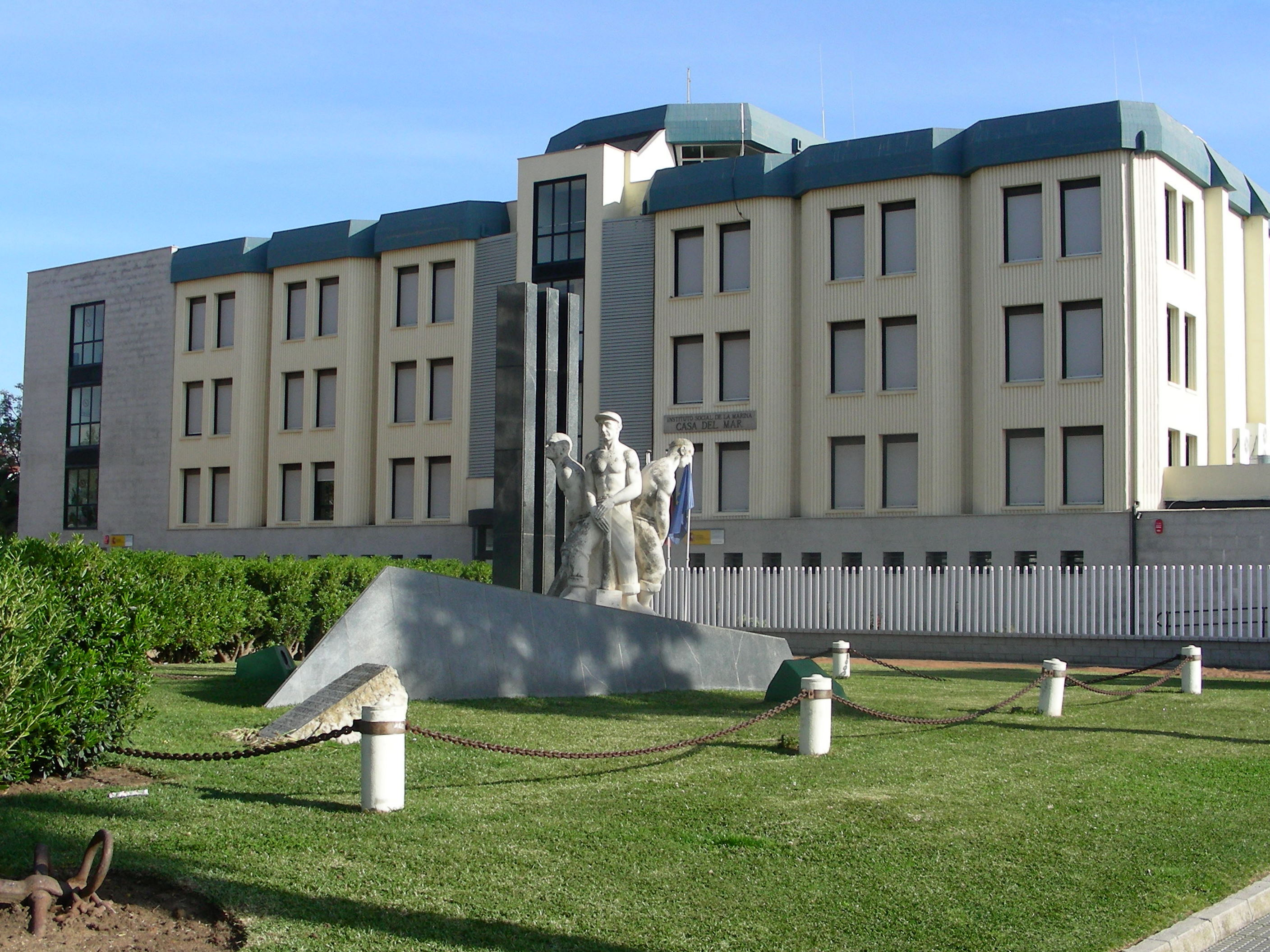
  Fishermen's Guild of Isla Cristina.
- USISA: Unión Salazonera Isleña S.A. is the historical company of the port, which since 1850 has been growing and grouping others, currently becoming the first company on the island and the first Andalusian company in its sector. The company has the capacity to process 180 tons per day in freezing tunnels. It moves a volume in the order of 12,000 tons of fish and its turnover in 2010 amounted to 23 million euros, (Note: Comparing it at the Andalusian level, only Ubago in Malaga and Productos Congelados del Sur in Cadiz surpass it in turnover.) the workforce in 2011 reached 387 workers, it has received several awards and its internationalization is 20%, carried out in Germany, Austria, Slovenia, Hungary, Italy, Poland and Switzerland. It has offices in Isla Cristina (headquarters), Valencia and Barcelona.
- Other companies operating in the port are La Higuerita, whose main value is to fish its own cod in Iceland, IPESSA, with salted and frozen fish among its main products, and Pescatun Isleña S.L., dedicated to the commercialization of farmed fish products.

== Marina ==
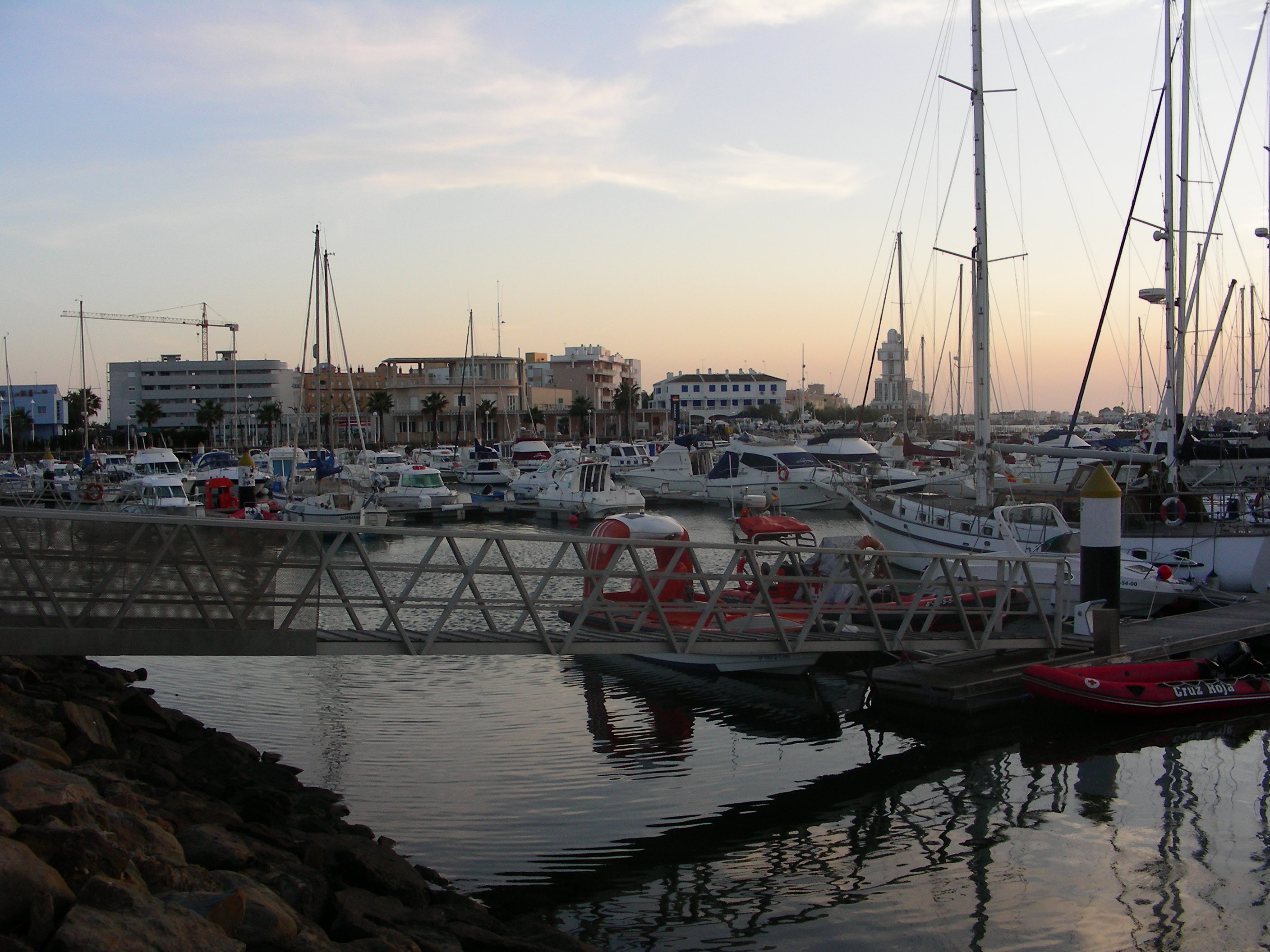
View of the marina of Isla Cristina.

The marina is managed by the Empresa Pública de Puertos de Andalucía (EPPA) and has 204 berths. The 2007 PGOU includes an extension that increases the number of pontoons and moorings. On November 10, 2009, the environmental impact declaration for its construction was initiated, specifying that it will have 760 mooring points and another 160 anchoring points in Playa de la Gola, on the left bank of the Carreras estuary, taking advantage of the eastern breakwater as protection.

The current one, built around 1994, has a dry dock, a ramp with a towing capacity of 32 t (31 long tons; 35 short tons), a 5 t (4.9 long tons; 5.5 short tons) capacity crane, a commercial area and other facilities. The port has been awarded the blue flag for the entire period from 2001 to 2010. The management of the neighboring port of El Terrón is carried out from the captaincy of this marina.

== Navigation ==
The nautical charts in which the Instituto Hidrográfico de la Marina represents in detail the port of Isla Cristina are the 440A and 440:

- 440A
  Mouth of the Guadiana River and Isla Cristina estuary.
  Scale 1:20.000
  Edition I of December 2000
- 440
  From the Guadiana River to the Piedras River (official name Del río Guardiana al río de Las Piedras)
  Scale 1:50.000
  Edition I of March 2003

=== Transportation ===
From one of the pontoons of this port the maritime transport of passengers to the nearby port of Punta del Moral is carried out, with an hourly frequency during peak traffic hours and every two hours in the rest. Although it is the only permanent link that exists, in the early 20th century there was another ferry service linking Isla Cristina with Ayamonte and possibly also with Vila Real de Santo António.

== Bibliography ==
- López Márquez, Vicente (2008). Regreso a Isla Cristina. Biografía breve de D. Román Pérez Romeu (in Spanish). Isleña (published May 14, 2008).
- Engineering team (2007). Revisión Adaptación del Plan Gral. de Ordenación Urbanística de I. Cristina. Estudio de Impacto Ambiental (in Spanish). Ayuntamiento de Isla Cristina.
- Sosa Rodríguez, José (1970). Historia de Isla Cristina (Biografía sentimental) (in Spanish). Seville: Esc. Gráfica Salesiana.
- Bogarín Díaz, Jesús (2007). 150 Linajes Isleños (in Spanish). Universidad de Huelva. ISBN 978-84-96826-09-0.
