= Amblypalpis =

Scientific classification
- Domain: Eukaryota
- Kingdom: Animalia
- Phylum: Arthropoda
- Class: Insecta
- Order: Lepidoptera
- Family: Gelechiidae
- Subfamily: Gelechiinae
- Genus: Amblypalpis; Ragonot, 1886

Genus of moths

Amblypalpis is a genus of moth in the family Gelechiidae.

== Species ==
- Amblypalpis olivierella Ragonot, 1886
- Amblypalpis tamaricella Danilevski, 1955
