= Isla Cristina =

Coordinates: 37°11′57″N 7°19′17″W

Isla Cristina, Spain
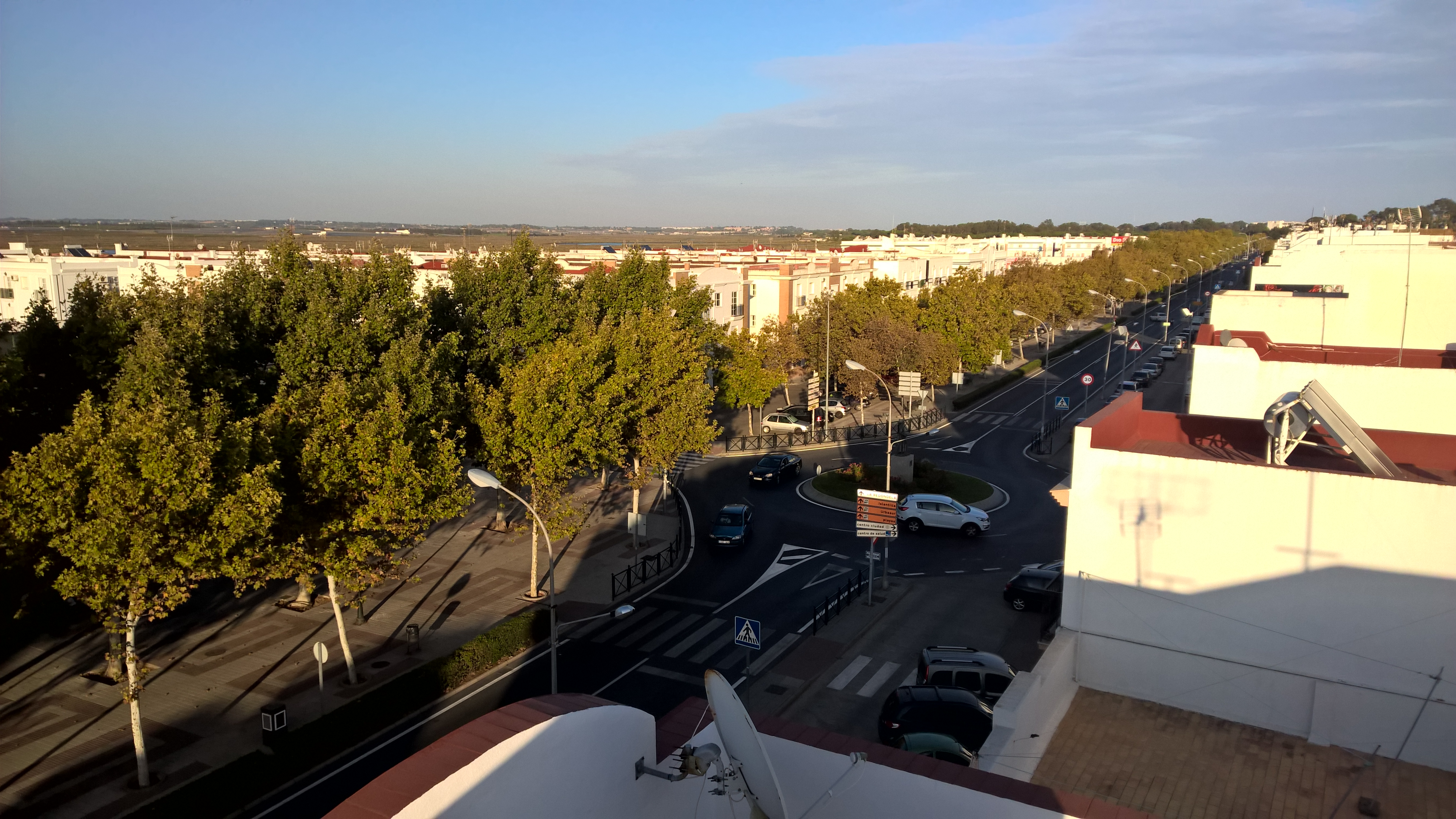

- Flag Coat of arms

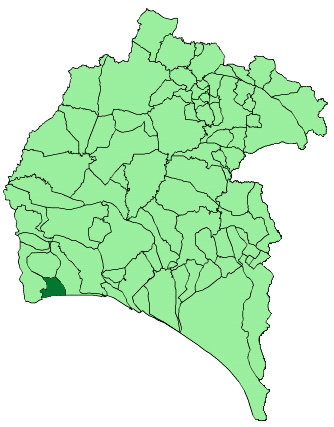
- Location of Isla Cristina
- Municipality: Huelva

Government
  - Mayor: María Luisa Faneca

Area
  - Total: 50 km^{2} (19 sq mi)
  - Land: 50 km^{2} (19 sq mi)
  - Water: 0.00 km^{2} (0 sq mi)

Population (2025-01-01)
  - Total: 21,525
  - Density: 430/km^{2} (1,100/sq mi)
- Time zone: UTC+1 (CET)
  - Summer (DST): UTC+2 (CEST)

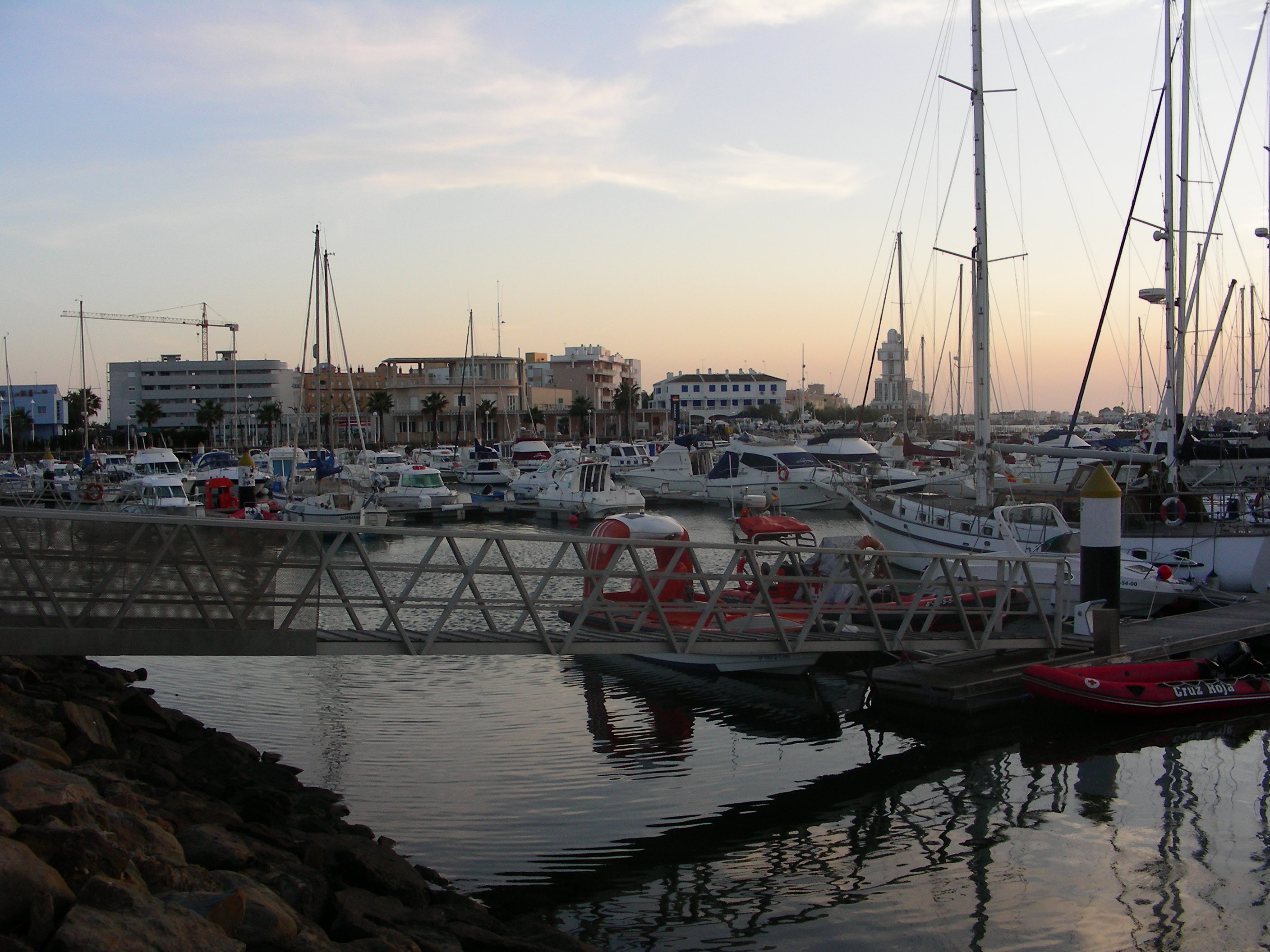
Isla Cristina (2008).

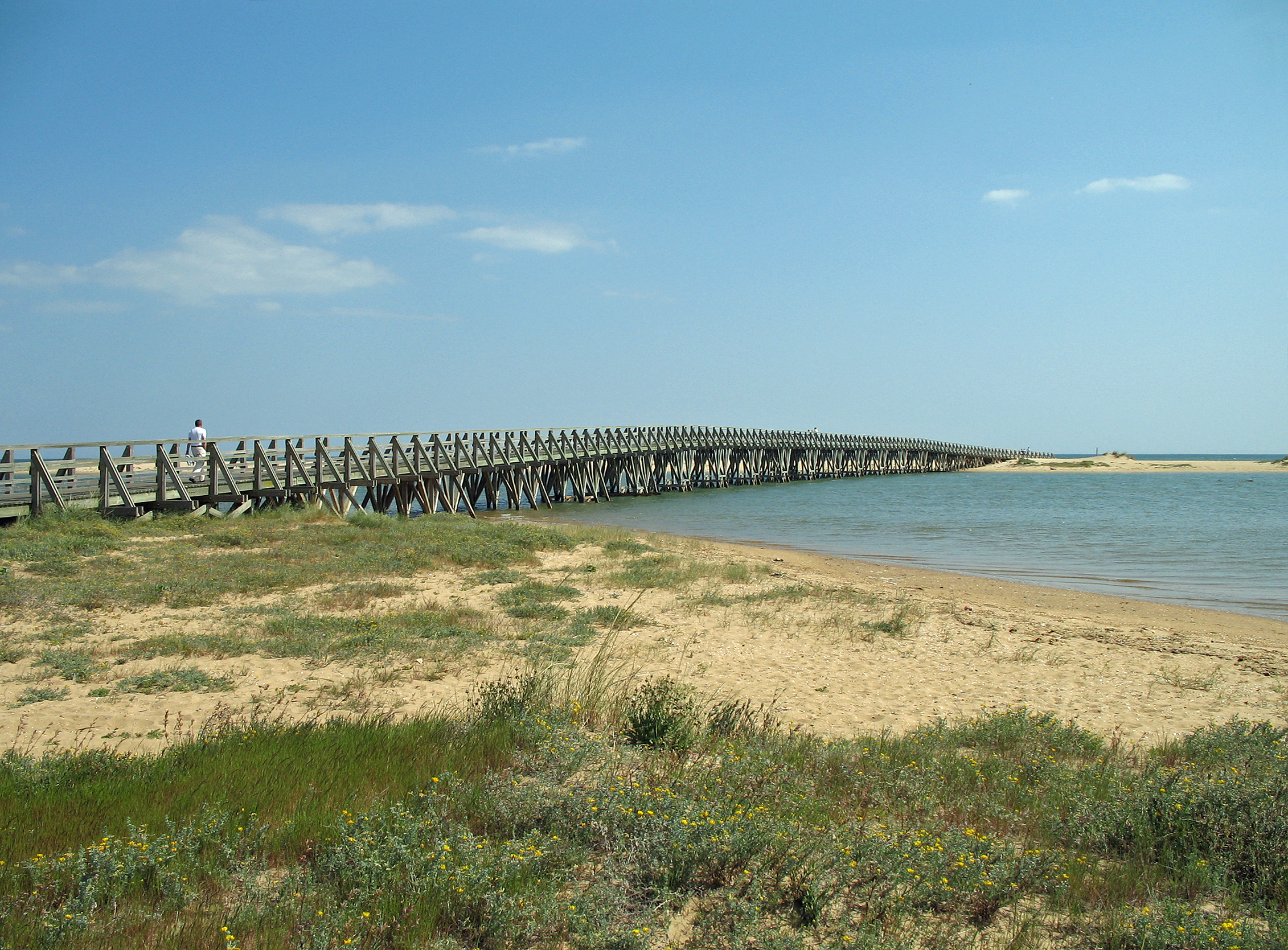
Wooden bridge to the beach (Puente de la Gola).

Isla Cristina is a city and municipality located in the province of Huelva, Spain, close to the Portuguese border. According to the 2025 municipal register, the city has a population of 21,525 inhabitants.

Isla Cristina remains one of the most important fishing ports in Andalusia, its catch being highly prized throughout Spain.

It is a popular summer holiday resort, particularly with the Spaniards themselves. Sevillanos flock to the area in July and August, much of the attraction being the kilometers of 'Blue Flag' standard beaches.

== Toponymy ==
Isla Cristina was given its current name on April 12, 1834 in honor of Maria Christina of the Two Sicilies and her service to the regions of Andalusia and Extremadura during the cholera epidemic of 1833–34. The city was originally called La Figuereta (a name in Catalan given by the first Catalan settlers), La Higuerita or La Figarilla (English: The Little Fig Tree), when it was founded in 1755. The name was christened as Real Isla de La Higuerita (English: Royal Island of the Little Fig Tree) in 1802.

== Symbols ==
The city's main symbols are the water well, the fig tree and the sea, which reflect the culture and history of the city.

== Environment ==
The marismas de Isla Cristina, next to the towns of Ayamonte and Isla Cristina, are a protected nature reserve.

== Isla Cristina Catalan ==
During the Catalan migration, the population carried its customs and language. Although the language only lasted a few generations, some words of the first settlers remain as localisms, with examples such as the use of Catalan words in Isla Cristina due to its population origins in the 18th century.

The initial inhabitants of the island, of Catalan origin and mainly from parishes located in Mataró and Sitges, as the first generation passed, interaction with public institutions was necessary, such as the civil and religious registry of their descendants. This registry had many phonological errors due to the non-correspondence in Spanish of some Catalan surnames. It is observed in the civil registry records of the time how the same surname of a family is altered in successive generations, maintaining and returning to its old form and sometimes changing irreversibly. A case that is still very clarifying today is that of Father Mirabent, chronicler of the city thanks to whom much of the information preserved about the region during the 18th and part of the 19th centuries has reached our days. Sometimes his surname is written with 'v' and others with 'b'. The confusion that exists between both forms, Mirabent and Miravent, due to the different spelling and the same pronunciation, caused that in the official Andalusian writings (Archdiocese of Seville, Parish of the 12 Apostles of La Redondela, Town Hall of the Real Isla de la Higuerita, etc.) of the 18th and 19th centuries it was written indistinctly without observing the original Catalan form of the 12th century Miravent. Currently the institute of the town that bears his name is written with 'v', while the avenue in his honor is written with 'b'.

Other surnames such as Camps were Hispanicized to Campos as the one that already existed, and were even newly minted transforming Frigolet into Frigulé.

Words from the current local dialect that originate from Catalan include cheta (tap) and lota (fish market).

== See also ==
- Port of Isla Cristina
- List of municipalities in Huelva
