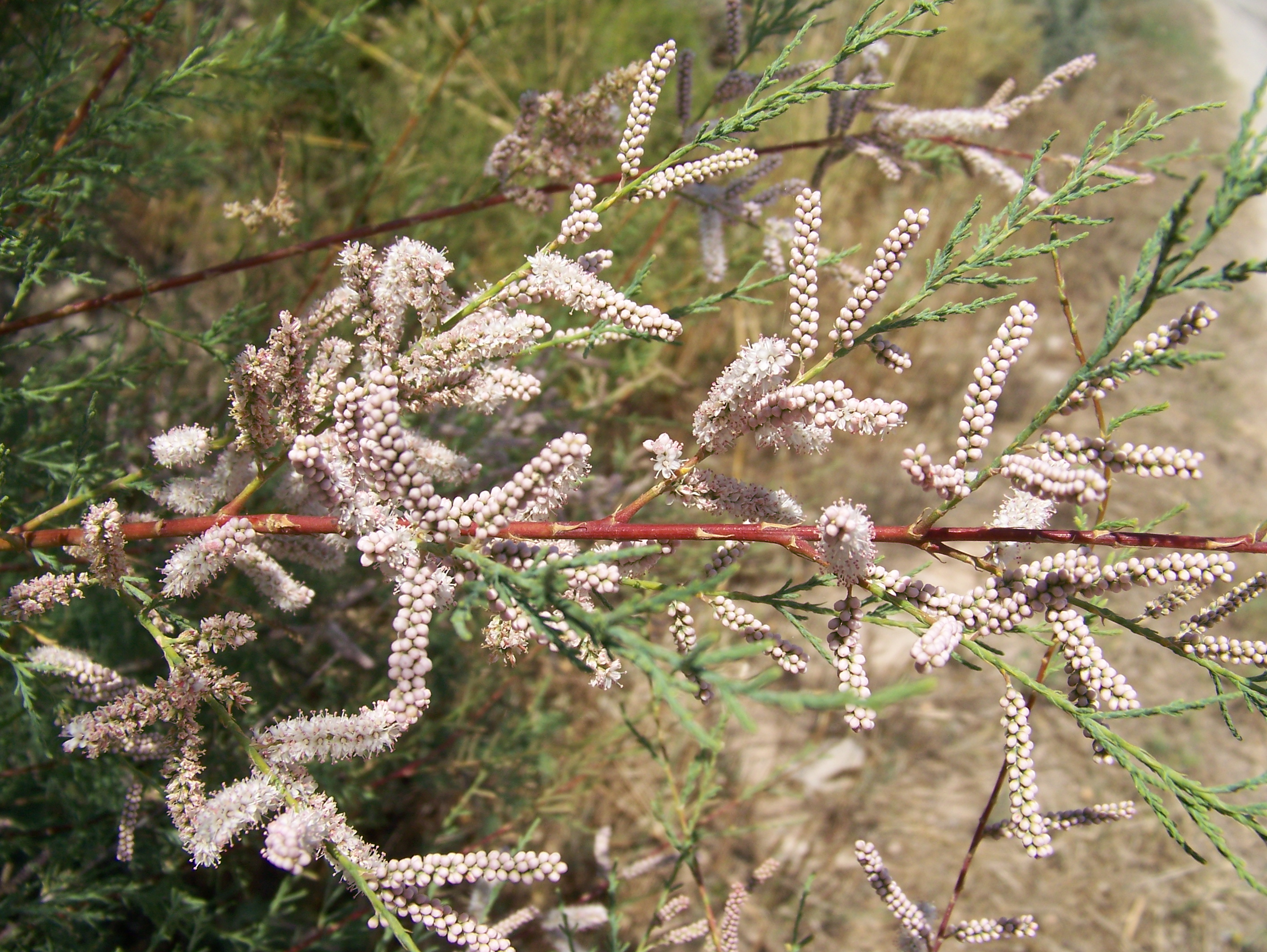

Scientific classification
- Kingdom: Plantae
- Clade: Tracheophytes
- Clade: Angiosperms
- Clade: Eudicots
- Order: Caryophyllales
- Family: Tamaricaceae
- Genus: Tamarix
- Species: T. africana

Binomial name
- Tamarix africana Poir.

Synonyms
- Tamarix hispanica

= Tamarix africana =

Species of plant

Tamarix africana, also known as the African tamarisk, is a species of tree in the family Tamaricaceae. They have a self-supporting growth form and simple leaves. Individuals can grow to 6.3 m.

== Sources ==
This article incorporates text from a free content work. Licensed under CC0 (license statement/permission). Text taken from Tamarix africana. Encyclopedia of Life.
