= Antonio León Ortega =

Spanish sculptor

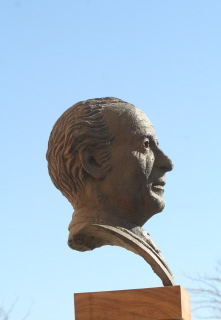
- León Ortega for Gamero Viñau.
- Born: December 7, 1907; Ayamonte, Huelva, Spain
- Died: January 9, 1991 (aged 83); Huelva, Spain
- Education: Academy of Arts, Madrid
- Known for: Sculpture

Antonio León Ortega (December 7, 1907 – January 9, 1991) was a Spanish sculptor known for his Andalusian imagery.

== Biography ==
Antonio León Ortega was born in Ayamonte, in the county of Huelva, on December 7, 1907.

When he was a teenager, he showed a restless passion and an innate ability for sculpture, producing his first self-taught works. When, years later, they were shown to the master Mariano Benlliure, they appeared to be typical of a mature sculptor.

He carried on his studies in Madrid from 1927 to 1934. He attended the Escuela de Bellas Artes de San Fernando, where he studied sculpture and design teaching under excellent teachers such as Mariano Benlliure, José Capuz, Manuel Benedito and Juan Adsuara, with whom he worked during a stage of his production.
In those years he approached Castilian imagery: he studied it in Valladolid, where he found his mentor in Gregorio Fernández.

Since 1938 he worked in his first workshop in San Cristobal Street in Huelva, sharing it with the painter Pedro Gómez. Soon the workshop became not only an informal school of artists, but also an atheneum of arts and humanities, frequented by all the artists who lived or passed through Huelva such as poets, journalists, doctors and writers. The workshop was known in the artistic world as the "San Cristobal’s Academy".
In the same years, he studied the Sevillana imagery through the works of the master Martínez Mountañés.
In 1964 he moved to a new workshop in Medico Luís Buendía Street and he worked there until 1985, year in which illness moved him away from all the activities.

In these 50 years of hard work, he produced more than four hundred works, including small and great size works, made of different materials such as wood, mud, stone, brass, and others. He elaborated on the religious works from a previous sketch drawn on mud and he sculpted them directly onto the wood with the help of the gouge and the mallet. In this way, he followed the traditional Spanish imagery way learned in Madrid from José Capuz and Juan Adsuara.

He produced lots of the images for the Holy Week of Huelva and Ayamonte and of many other towns in the counties of Huelva and Badajoz. He created other important religious and civil works in Seville, Cadiz, Malaga, Caceres, Salamanca, Pontevedra, Madrid, Belgium, United States, etc., as well as many others in smaller sizes, belonging to private collections in America and in Spain.

He created a modernist style of sculpture in Madrid, according to the twenties style: we can easily find it in works like the Retrato de Luna, in Manuel Bendito Museum, and the Retrato de Trinidad Navarro in Ayamonte.

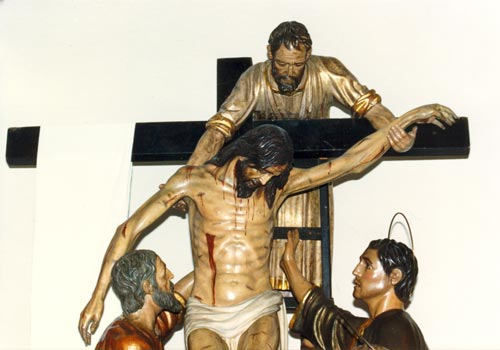
Descendimiento of Huelva

León Ortega's most renowned sculptures include The Descendimiento of Huelva, the Crucificados, the Cristo de la Sangre de los Estudiantes and the Virgen del amor of Huelva.

His outstanding productions include: the Yacente, the Cristo del Perdòn, the Angel de la oraciòn, the Cristo de la Borriquita, the Jesùs de las tres Caidas, the Cristo de la Victoria, the Cristo de la Conception, the San Cristobal, the Virgen de las Angustias and the Virgen de los Angeles in Huelva, the Pasión, the Yacente de las Angustias, the Cautivo, the Cristo de las Aguas and the Virgen de la paz in Ayamonte, the Nazareno of Beas and the Nazareno of Moguer.

At the same time he was an educator; he taught drawing and modelling classes in his workshop, in the Diocesan seminary and where today is the León Ortega School of Arts.

As sculptor, he mostly gave himself up to creating images, not only because this artistic field had always attracted him, but also because he was motivated by intimate religious convictions, that, connected to his social sensibility, place him into the area of the most involved Christianity.
His first religious works had a baroque touch, but then he found a very personal style: he chose a lighter form of lines and decorations and he tried to find a fusion between the Castilian and Andalucian imagery to get the essence of the sculpture only in its minimalism.

In the last five-year period — he worked until he was eighty — his production lost part of its sculptorical power. He created only small size works because they needed just a little physical effort as, for example, his last masterpiece, the Busto de Madame Cazenave.

His images are characterized by strength, beauty and sweetness due to his passion for wooden sculpture and for the model.

León Ortega died on January 9, 1991, in his house in Huelva.

== Works ==
=== Public works ===
- Beato San José Ramírez, 1955, Ayamonte.
- Platero , 1963, House of Zenobia. Museum Juan Ramón Jiménez. Moguer.

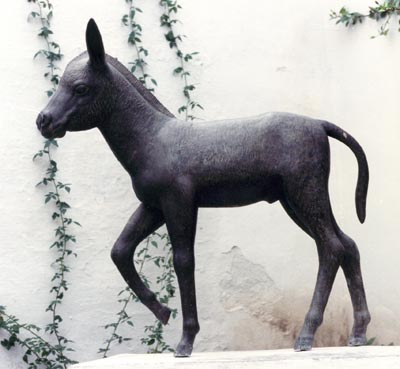
Platero. Museum J.R. Jiménez (Moguer)

- Monument to the Bishop P. Cantero Cuadrado, 1964. Diocesan seminar, Huelva.
- Monument to the painter Pedro Gómez, 1965, The Conquero, Huelva.
- Monument to Alonso Sánchez , 1970, Gardens Alonso Sánchez, Huelva.
- Monuments to Brother Juan Pérez and to Brother Antonio of Marchena, 1970, La Rabida Monastery, Environment of the monastery, Palos de la Frontera.
- Virgin Monumento of the Cinta, 1977, Hdad. de la Cinta, Sanctuary of Ntra. Sra. de la Cinta, Gardens, Huelva.
- Monumento to Martin Alonso Pinzón, 1978, Baiona. Pontevedra.
- Imágenes of the Facade of the Cathedral of the Merced: Virgin of the Grace , San Leandro , San Walabonso , San Vicente and Santa María , 1978, Cathedral of the Merced, Huelva. (picture)
- Monumento to Sor Ángela of the Cruz, 1984, Square of Isabel the Catholic (Square Niña), Huelva.
- Monumento to Madame Cazenave, 1985, Square of Madame Cazenave, Huelva.

=== Religious and private works ===
==== Huelva ====
Aljaraque

- Nazareno, 1940, Parroquia .
- San Sebastián, 1944, Parroquia .

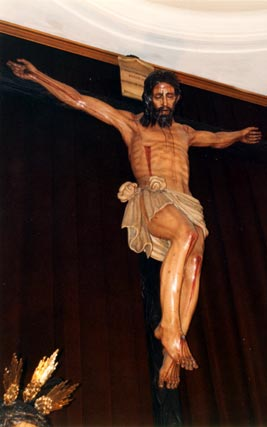
Cristo del Perdón (Huelva)

- Ntra. de los Remedios, 1951, Parroquia de Ntra. de los Remedios.
- Virgen de los Milagros, 1980, Church of Bellavista.

Almonaster la Real

- Cristo del Amor, 1948, Parroquia de San Martín.
- Cristo, 1961, City council, Capilla del Cementerio.

Alosno

- Cristo atado a la columna, 1944, Capilla .
- Evangelistas, 1944, Parroquia .

Aracena

- Cristo de la Sangre atado, 1943, Hermandad de la Vera-Cruz, Iglesia Prioral del Castillo.
- San Antonio Abad, 1943, Madres Carmelitas, Iglesia de Sta. Catalina.
- Sayones (two), 1945, Fraternity of the See-Cruz, Iglesia Prioral del Castillo.
- Virgen del Carmen, 1967, Madres Carmelitas, Iglesia de Sta. Catalina.

Ayamonte

- Retrato de Andrea Valdés, 1928, Private.
- Retrato de Miguel Valdés, 1928, Private.
- Retrato de Alberto Vélez and Mrs., 1931, Private.
- Retrato de Trinidad Navarro, 1931, Private.

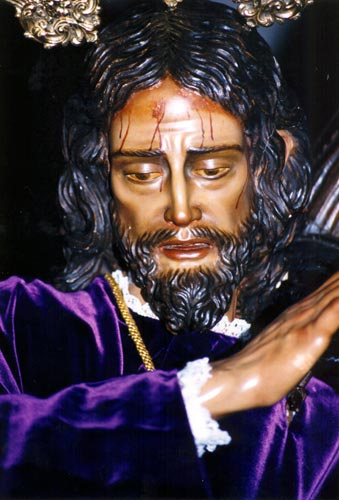
Pasión of Ayamonte

- Venus desnuda, 1931, Private.
- Retrato de Margarita Moreno, 1932, Privado.
- San Francisco, 1937, Hnas. de la Cruz. Convento Hermanas de la Cruz.
- Cristo Yacente, 1938, Hdad. de la Vera-Cruz, Iglesia de San Francisco.
- Cristo de la Vera-Cruz, 1940, Hdad. de la Vera-Cruz, Iglesia de San Francisco.
- Jesús de la Pasión, 1941, Hdad. de Pasión, Iglesia de las Angustias.
- Virgen de la Paz, 1944, Hdad. de Pasión, Iglesia de las Angustias.
- Cristo yacente, 1946, Hdad. del Santo Entierro, Iglesia de las Angustias.
- San Antonio, 1950, Iglesia de las Angustias.
- Cristo de las Aguas, 1957, Hdad. de la Lanzada, Iglesia de San Francisco.
- Jesús orando y Ángel, 1968, Hdad. de la Oración en el Huerto, Iglesia de El Salvador
- Virgen del Buen Fin, 1970, Hdad. de la Lanzada, Iglesia de San Francisco.
- Virgen del Rosario, 1972, Hdad. de Jesús Cautivo, Iglesia de la Merced.
- Cautivo, 1973, Hdad. de Jesús Cautivo, Iglesia de la Merced.
- Caballo, 1973, Hdad. de la Lanzada, Iglesia de San Francisco.
- Longinos, 1973, Hdad. de la Lanzada, Iglesia de San Francisco.
- Sor Ángela de la Cruz, 1984, Iglesia de las Angustias.

Beas

- Jesús de la Amargura, Nazareno, 1943, Hdad. del Nazareno, Ermita Virgen de los Clarines.
- Simón Cirineo, 1943, Hdad. del Nazareno, Ermita Virgen de los Clarines.
- Jesús Cautivo, 1947, Capilla del Sagrario.
- Resucitado, 1967, Parroquia.

Cartaya

- Virgen del Rosario, 1939, Parroquia de San Pedro Apóstol.
- San Sebastián, 1942, Ayuntamiento, Parroquia.
- Virgen de la Amargura, 1951, Hdad. de la Vera Cruz, Parroquia de San Pedro.
- Stmo. Cristo de la Vera Cruz, 1954, Hdad. de la Vera Cruz, Iglesia Parroquial de San Pedro.
- Virgen de las Mercedes, 1967.

Corrales

- Santa Bárbara, 1958, Parroquia.
- Santa María Reina del Mundo, 1958, Parroquia.
- Cautivo, 1959, Parroquia.

Corteconcepción

- Virgen de los Dolores, 1958, Parroquia.

El Campillo

- Crucificado, 1967, Iglesia parroquial.

El Cerro de Andévalo

- Calvario en el Retablo, 1953, Parroquia de Ntra. Sra. de Gracia.
- Virgen del Andévalo, 1953, Parroquia Ntra. Sra. de Gracia.

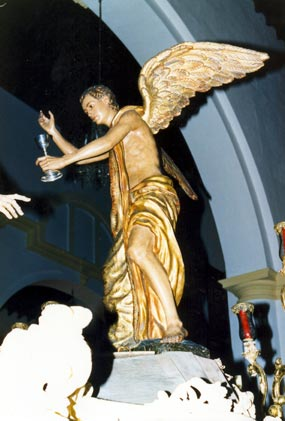
Ángel de la Oración en el Huerto (Huelva)

- Virgen de Albricias, 1958, Parroquia de Ntra. Sra. de Gracia.
- Nazareno, 1969, Hermandad Sacramental, Parroquia de Ntra. Sra. de Gracia.
- Sor Ángela de la Cruz, 1984, Plaza Sor Ángela.

El Judío

- Virgen del Perpetuo Socorro, 1968, Capilla de Ntra. Sra. del Perpetuo Socorro.
- Cristo, 1978, Iglesia, Capilla de Ntra. Sra. del Perpetuo Socorro.

Galaroza

- Cristo del Murtiga, 1951, Iglesia Ntra. Sra. del Carmen.

Gibraleón

- Virgen de la Soledad, 1947, Capilla Ntra. Sra. del Carmen.

Huelva

- Primeras Obras del Campo: Perra Dora, Autorretrato, Pastor con vaca, Cabra 1, Cabra 2, Busto de Virgen, Cabeza Caballo, 1924, Foundation Escultor León Ortega.
- Virgen de la Victoria, 1940, Hdad. de la Victoria, unknown whereabouts.
- Jesús de la Humildad, Herodes y Sayones, 1942, Hdad. de la Victoria, Iglesia del Sagrado Corazón.
- Ntra., Sra. de la Paz, 1943, Hdad. del Stmo. Cristo de la Victoria, Iglesia de San Sebastián.
- Ángel, Oración en el Huerto, 1943, Hermandad Oración en el Huerto, Iglesia de la Concepción.
- Cristo Yacente, 1943, Hdad. de Ntra. Sra. de las Angustias, Ermita de la Soledad.
- Virgen de la Soledad, 1944, Hdad. de la Soledad, Ermita de la Soledad.
- Verónica, 1945, Hdad. de las Tres Caídas, Iglesia del Sagrado Corazón.
- Ntro. P. Jesús de las Penas en sus Tres Caídas, 1945, Hdad. de las Tres Caídas, Iglesia del Sagrado Corazón.
- Cristo de la Victoria y 3 Sayones, 1945, Hdad. del Stmo. Cristo de la Victoria, Iglesia de San Sebastián.
- Cristo del Perdón, 1946, Parroquia, Iglesia del Sagrado Corazón.
- Cristo en su Entrada Triunfal, 1946, Hdad. de la Entrada Triunfal "de la Borriquita", Iglesia de San Pedro.
- Niño con Palma, 1946, Hdad. de la Entrada Triunfal "de la Borriquita", Iglesia de San Pedro.
- Cristo del Amor, 1949, Hdad. Santa Cena, Iglesia del Sagrado Corazón.
- Virgen de los Ángeles, 1949, Hdad. de la Entrada Triunfal "de la Borriquita", Iglesia de San Pedro.
- María Stma. del Amor, 1949, Hdad. de las Tres Caídas, Iglesia del Sagrado Corazón.
- Cristo de la Sangre, 1950, Hermandad de los Estudiantes, Iglesia de San Sebastián.

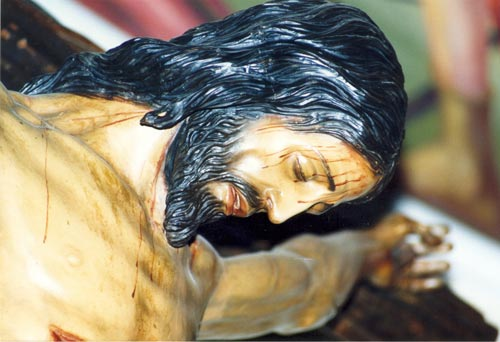
Cristo de la Sangre de Huelva

- San Juan Evangelista, 1951, Hdad. de la Victoria, Iglesia del Sagrado Corazón.
- Virgen de la Resignación en sus Dolores, 1952, Hdad. del Descendimiento, Iglesia de San Pedro.
- Grupo del Descendimiento: Cristo, Virgen, Magdalena, San Juan, José de Arimatea y Nicodemo, 1952–1953, Hdad. del Descendimiento, Iglesia de San Pedro.
- Ntra. Sra. del Rosario, 1954, Hdad. Sagrada Cena, Iglesia del Sagrado Corazón.
- Virgen del Valle, 1956, Hermandad de los Estudiantes, Iglesia de San Sebastián.
- Ntra. Sra. de Montemayor, 1956, Ilustre Hdad. Filial de Ntra. Sra. de Montemayor, Iglesia del Sagrado Corazón, Capilla Hermandad Tres Caídas.
- San Cristóbal, 1956, Iglesia de los Dolores.
- Virgen del Rocío, 1958, Parroquia, Iglesia de Nuestra Señora del Rocío.
- Virgen de las Angustias, 1958, Hdad. de Ntra. Sra. de las Angustias, Ermita de la Soledad.
- San Juan de Dios, 1959, Obispado, Catedral de la Merced.
- Virgen de Gracia, 1960, Seminario, Capilla del Seminario Menor.
- Relieve Virgen del Rocío, 1961, Hdad. de las Tres Caídas, Casa Hermandad Tres Caídas.
- Virgen de la Amargura, 1967, Hermanas de la Cruz, Convento de las Hermanas de la Cruz.
- Cristo, 1967, Capilla Escuela Náutica Pesquera.
- Corazón de Jesús, 1967, Parroquia, Iglesia de San Pedro.
- Virgen de los Milagros, 1967, Diputación de Huelva.
- Beato Mtro. Juan de Ávila, 1967, Seminario Diocesano.
- Cristo de la Iglesia de la Concepción, 1968, Ermita de la Soledad.
- Cristo, 1968, Hospital, Capilla Hospital Vázquez Díaz.
- Virgen del Carmen, 1968, Hospital, Capilla Hospital Vázquez Díaz.
- Cristo, 1972, Hermanas de la Cruz, Convento de las Hermanas de la Cruz.
- Corazón de Jesús, 1972, Hermanas de la Cruz, Convento de las Hermanas de la Cruz.
- Santa María Madre de la Iglesia, 1973, Parroquia, Iglesia de Santa María Madre de la Iglesia.
- Jesús del Calvario, 1973, Hdad. del Calvario, Capilla de Jesús del Calvario.
- Jesús Cautivo, 1974, Parroquia del Rocío, Iglesia de Nuestra Señora del Rocío.
- Cristo de la Fe, 1975, Hdad. de la Fe, Iglesia de Santa María Madre de la Iglesia.
- Cristo, 1975, Hnas. Nazarenas, Capilla Hermanas Misioneras de Nazaret.
- Virgen con Niño (Stma. Virgen de Nazaret), 1975, Hnas Nazarenas, Capilla Hermanas Misioneras de Nazaret.
- Cristo Crucificado, 1975, Parroquia, Iglesia de Nuestra Señora del Rocío.
- Cristo Crucificado, 1979, Parroquia, Iglesia Parroquial de San Juan de Ávila.
- Virgen del Amparo, 1983, Residencia de Pensionistas La Orden.
- Cirineo, 1983, Hdad. del Cristo de la Flagelación, Iglesia del Gran Poder.
- Jesús Cautivo, 1985, Hermandad del Cautivo, Capilla de la Misericordia.
- Busto M. Cazenave, 1985, Foundation Escultor León Ortega.

La Nava

- Cristo de los Caminantes o las Virtudes, 1967, Ermita del Cristo de las Virtudes.

La Redondela

- Nazareno, 1941, Iglesia Parroquial.

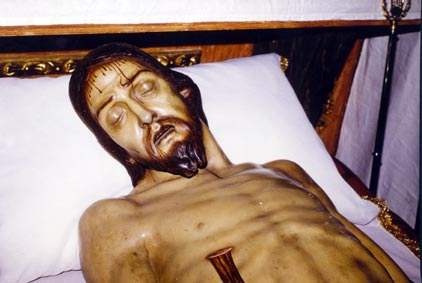
Yacente (Huelva)

Lepe

- San Francisco Javier, 1954, Parroquia, Parroquia de Sto. Domingo.
- Virgen del Carmen, 1954, Parroquia, Capilla del Carmen.
- Virgen de la Paz, 1966, Hdad. de la Borriquita, Capilla del Cristo del Mar.
- Cautivo, 1980, Capilla del Cristo del Mar.
- Grupo de la Borriquita, 1980, Capilla del Cristo del Mar.
- Cristo, 1969, Parroquia de Ntra. Sra. del Carmen. La Antilla.
- Virgen del Carmen, 1969, Parroquia de Ntra. Sra. del Carmen. La Antilla.

Lucena del Puerto

- Virgen del Rocío, 1942, Hdad. del Rocío, Parroquia de San Vicente Mártir.
- Virgen de Consolación en sus Dolores, 1948, Hdad. del Señor del Gran Poder y Ntra. Sra. de Consolación, Parroquia de San Vicente Mártir.
- Jesús del Gran Poder, 1948, Hdad. del Señor del Gran Poder y Ntra. Sra. de Consolación, Parroquia de San Vicente Mártir.
- Virgen de la Luz, 1956, Hacienda de la Luz, Oratorio.

Mina la Zarza-Silos de Calañas

- Cristo del Perdón, 1947, Parroquia de Santa Bárbara.
- Santa _Bárbara, 1950, Congregación Mariana, Parroquia de Santa Bárbara.
- Virgen de la Amargura, 1956, Parroquia de Santa Bárbara.
- San Agustín (Retablo), 1956, Parroquia de Santa Bárbara.
- San Francisco Javier, 1956, Parroquia de Santa Bárbara.

Minas de Riotinto

- Cristo, 1947, Parroquia de Santa Bárbara.
- Inmaculada, 1951, Parroquia de Santa Bárbara.

Minas de Tharsis

- Dolorosa, 1967.

Moguer

- Jesús Nazareno, 1938, Hdad. Ntro. Padre Jesús Nazareno, Ermita de San Sebastián.
- San Juan Evangelista, 1940, Hdad. del Nazareno, Ermita de San Sebastián.
- Virgen de los Dolores ó Ntra. Sra. de Engracia, 1944, Hdad. Ntro. Padre Jesús Nazareno, Ermita de San Sebastián.
- Cirineo, 1947, Hdad. Ntro. Padre Jesús Nazareno, Ermita de San Sebastián.
- Cristo de la Paz Eterna, (yacente), 1962, Cofradía de Nazarenos de Stimo. Cristo de la Misericordia, Ermita de San Sebastián.
- San Francisco de Asís, 1963, Iglesia de San Francisco.
- Cristo del Amor y Ángel de la Oración en el Huerto, 1975, Cofradía de Jóvenes Nazarenos de Stimo. Cristo del Amor en la Oración en el Huerto, Ermita de San Sebastián.

Nerva

- Virgen Dolorosa, 1967, Parroquia.

Niebla

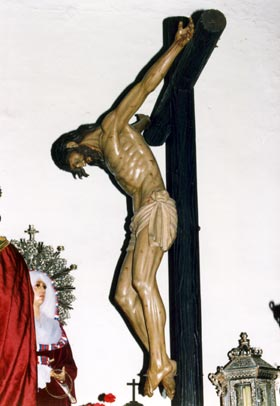
Cristo de las Aguas (Ayamonte)

- Inmaculada, 1963, Parroquia de Ntra. Sra. de la Granada.
- San Bernabé, 1967.

Palos de la Frontera

- Cristo del Mayor Dolor, (crucificado), 1962, La Rabida Monastery.
- Santa María de la Rábida, Virgen de los Milagros, versión de León de la original del siglo XIV, 1966, La Rabida Monastery.
- San Jorge, 1976, Parroquia de San Jorge Mártir.

Puebla de Guzmán

- Santa Lucía, 1953, Parroquia Sta. Cruz Nazareno.
- Nazareno, 1967, Parroquia Sta. Cruz Nazareno.

Sanlúcar de Guadiana

- Virgen de la Rábida, 1938, Parroquia de Ntra. Sra. de las Flores.

Santa Bárbara de Casa

- Santa Bárbara, 1967.

Tharsis

- Cristo, 1958, Parroquia de Santa Bárbara.
- Inmaculada, 1958, Parroquia de Santa Bárbara.

Trigueros

- San Antonio Abad, 1979, Hdad. del Rocío de Trigueros, Capilla Hdad. del Rocío.

Villablanca

- Cristo del Amor, 1977, Parroquia de San Sebastián.

Villanueva de los Castillejos

- Inmaculada, 1950, Iglesia de la Inmaculada Concepción.

Villarrasa

- San Isidro 1967.

==== Badajoz ====
Bodonal de la Sierra

- Cristo de las Siete Palabras, 1971, Parroquia de San Blas.

Jerez de los Caballeros

- Cristo y Ángel en la Oración en el Huerto, 1956, Cofradía del Señor orando y Ntra. Sra. del Rosario, Iglesia Parroquial de San Miguel Arcángel.
- Grupo del Descendimiento: Cristo, Virgen, San Juan, José de Arimatea y Nicodemo, 1957, Cofradía de Ntro. Padre Jesús Nazareno, Iglesia de Santa María. *Virgen de la Encarnación, 1966, Cofradía de Ntro. Padre Jesús Nazareno, Iglesia de Santa María de la Encarnación.
- Corazón de Jesús, 1967, Torre del Reloj. Destroyed.
- Cristo Crucificado, 1969, Hermanas de la Cruz, Convento Hermanas de la Cruz.
- Virgen de la Salud, 1970, Hermanas de la Cruz, Convento Hermanas de la Cruz.

Puebla de Sancho Pérez

- Cristo atado a la columna (Jesús Yacente), 1966, Hdad. de Ntro. Padre Jesús Nazareno, Parroquia.
- María Stima. del Mayor Dolor, 1968, Hdad. de Ntro. Padre Jesús Nazareno, Parroquia.
- Jesús orando en el huerto, 1971, Hdad. de la Oración en el Huerto, Parroquia.

==== Cáceres ====
- Cristo, 1955, Misioneros de la Preciosa Sangre de Cristo, Casa del Sol.

==== Madrid ====
- Retrato de Luna, 1930, Museo Estudio de Manuel Benedito.
- Virgen del Aire, 1967, Parroquia de Cuatro Vientos.
- Cristo, 1967, Parroquia de Cuatro Vientos.

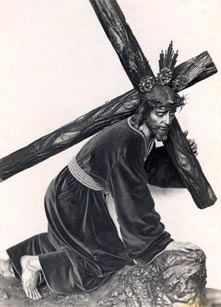
Jesús de las Tres Caídas (Huelva) en el taller de San Cristobal, 1945.

==== Málaga ====
Vélez-Málaga

- San Antonio, 1967. Corazón de Jesús, 1967.

==== Salamanca ====
Ciudad Rodrigo

- San José, 1962, Seminario Diocesano, Seminario (Iglesia, Altar Lateral).
- Corazón de Jesús, 1962, Obispado de Ciudad Rodrigo, Parroquia del Sagrario.

La Fuente de San Esteban

- San Esteban, 1961, Parroquia (Retablo Central).
- Corazón de Jesús, 1963, Parroquia (Retablo Central).
- Corazón de María, 1963, Parroquia (Retablo Central).

Sancti Spiritus

Cristo, 1962, Parroquia.

==== Sevilla ====
La Puebla de Cazalla

- Virgen de las Virtudes, 1953, Parroquia.

Sevilla

- Retrato de José Vázquez, 1936, Estudio de José Vázquez.
- Cristo, 1967, Hermanas de la Cruz, Casa Convento de la Beata Ángela de la Cruz.

Villanueva del Río y Minas

- Virgen de la Salud, 1967, Hnas. de la Cruz, Capilla Hnas. de la Cruz.

==== Tenerife ====
- Virgen de la Cinta, 1965, Parroquia de San Agustín. La Laguna.

==== Belgium ====
Brussels

- Cristo, 1965, Private.

==== United States ====
Stamford (Connecticut)

- San Maximiliano, 1978, Holy Name Church.

== Sources and Bibliography ==
- 1. Foundation León Ortega
- 2. González Gómez, Juan Miguel & Carrasco Terriza, Manuel Jesús, Escultura Mariana Onubense,1981, Instituto de Estudios Onubenses "Padre Marchena" & Diputación de Huelva, ISBN 84-85268-87-3.
- 3. Gil Vázquez, E., Padilla Pons, J., y Román Pantrigo, R., De la Historia de las Cofradías de Huelva, 1982, Delegación Cultura Huelva & Diputación de Huelva & Caja Provincial Ahorros Huelva.
- 4. Carrasco Terriza, Manuel Jesús, Andalucia y América en el siglo XX: Una escultura de León Ortega en Stamford, USA, pags. 269–274, 1986, Universidad de Sta. Maria de la Rábida, ISBN 84-00-06794-0.
- 5. Sugrañes Gómez, Eduardo J., Historia de la Semana Santa de Huelva, 1992, C.E.C.A., ISBN 84-606-0719-4.
- 6. Velasco Nevado, Jesús, Historia de la Pintura Contemporánea en Huelva: 1.892 - 1.992, 1993, Diputación de Huelva - Fundación El Monte, ISBN 84-86842-77-8.
- 7. AA. VV, A. León Ortega (1907–1991) Catálogo de la Exposición. Museo Provincial de Huelva, Abril-Mayo 1996. Huelva, Fundación El Monte-Junta de Andalucía, Consejería de Cultura, 1996, s.p.
- 8. Fernández Jurado, Jesús & García de la Concha Delgado, Federico & Rodríguez Mateos, Joaquín, Huelva Cofrade. Historia de la Semana Santa de Huelva y su Provincia. 4 tomos., 1997, Ediciones Tartessos, S.L. ISBN 84-7663-036-0
- 9. Carrasco Terriza, Manuel Jesús, La escultura del Crucificado en la tierra llana de Huelva, 2000, Diputación de Huelva, ISBN 84-8163-217-1.
- 10. de la Lastra Buades, Pedro Jesús & Cruzado García, Agustín, Semana Santa en Huelva, 2003, Marsay Ediciones, S. L., ISBN 978-84-95539-60-1.
- 11. AA. VV., El Pregón. Semana Santa en Ayamonte, 2003, Hermandad de El Salvador y Otras.
- 12. Garrido Palacios, Manuel, Una mirada a Huelva, 2004, Fundación Caja Rural del Sur, ISBN 84-609-2309-6.
- 13. de la Lastra Buades, Pedro Jesús, Tesoros de la Semana Santa de Huelva, 2004, El Correo de Andalucía, S.L.
- 14. Carrasco Terriza, M.J. & González Gómez, J.M. & Oliver Carlos, A. & Pleguezuelo Hernández, A. & Sánchez Sánchez, J.M., Guía artística de Huelva y su Provincia, 2006, Fundación José Manuel Lara ISBN 978-84-96556-19-5 & Diputación de Huelva ISBN 978-84-8163-395-5.
- 15. Diccionario Biográfico Español, Real Academia de la Historia, Madrid, 2011.
