= José Moreno Carbonero =

Spanish artist (1860–1942)

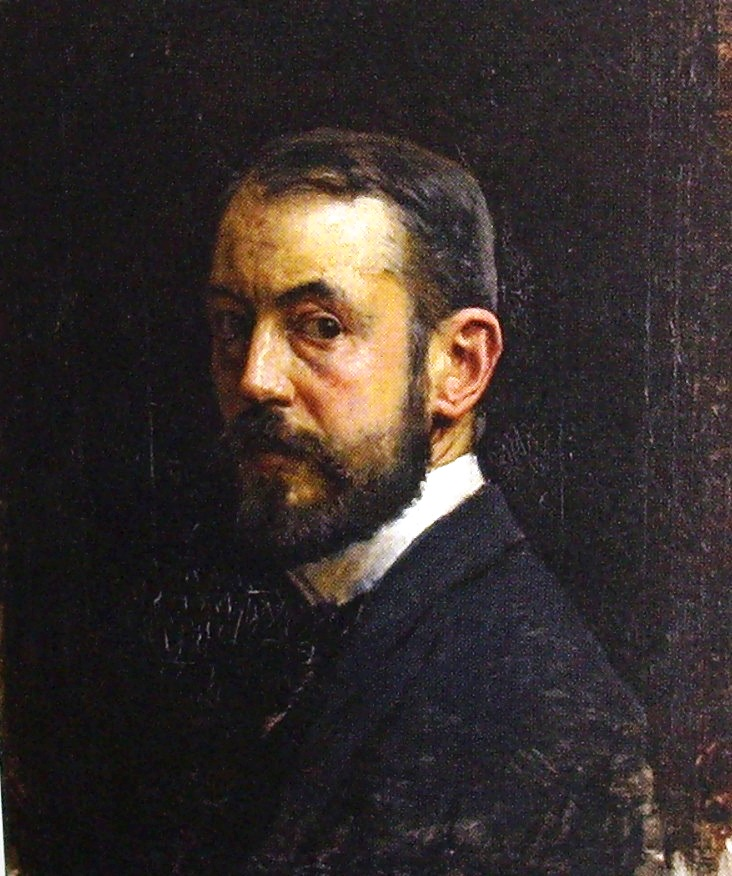
- Self-portrait, José Moreno Carbonero
- Born: 24 March 1858, Málaga, Spain
- Died: 15 April 1942 (aged 82), Madrid, Francoist Spain
- Education: School of Fine Arts, Málaga
- Known for: Painting
- Movement: Orientalist

José Moreno Carbonero (Spanish: [xo'se mo'reno karbo'nero]; 24 March 1858 – 15 April 1942) was a Spanish painter and decorator. A prominent member of the Málaga School of Painting, he is considered one of the last great history painters of the 19th century. He was a celebrated portrait painter who enjoyed the patronage of Madrid's high society. He also created genre scenes and some landscapes, vedutas and still lifes.

Moreno Carbonero was widely recognized, both nationally and internationally, during his lifetime. He received awards, among others, at the Exposition Universelle of Paris in 1889, the Budapest International Exhibition in 1890, the Universal Exhibition of Berlin in 1891 and the only medal at the World's Columbian Exposition of Chicago in 1893.

His work is represented at some of the most influential museums in the world, with El Prado Museum, in Madrid, holding an important collection. Among his masterworks are The Entry of Roger de Flor in Constantinople (1888), The Prince don Carlos de Viana (1881), The Conversion of the Duke of Gandía (1884) and The Founding of Buenos Aires (1910–1924).

== Early life and education ==
Moreno Carbonero was born in the Perchel quarter of Málaga, the son of a carpenter. His exact birthdate has been object of debate, frequently cited as March 1860, but the original birth certificate is conserved and states he was born on 24 March 1858. A precocious artist, in 1868 he joined the school of fine arts in his home town and also took classes in the studio of Bernardo Ferrándiz. He sold his first painting at age fifteen for 2000 pesetas (an important sum at the time) and came to be known as "el niño Moreno" (the Moreno child) because of his early mastery of oil painting.

Bernardo Ferrándiz was the leading Málaga artist of the moment and introduced his young student to history painting. Ferrándiz instilled in him his own revolutionary views which he expressed in his historical works by proclaiming a commitment to independence, freedom and nonconformity. Moreno Carbonero obtained the gold medal in the Exhibition of the Lyceum of Málaga in 1872, being only fourteen.

== Career ==
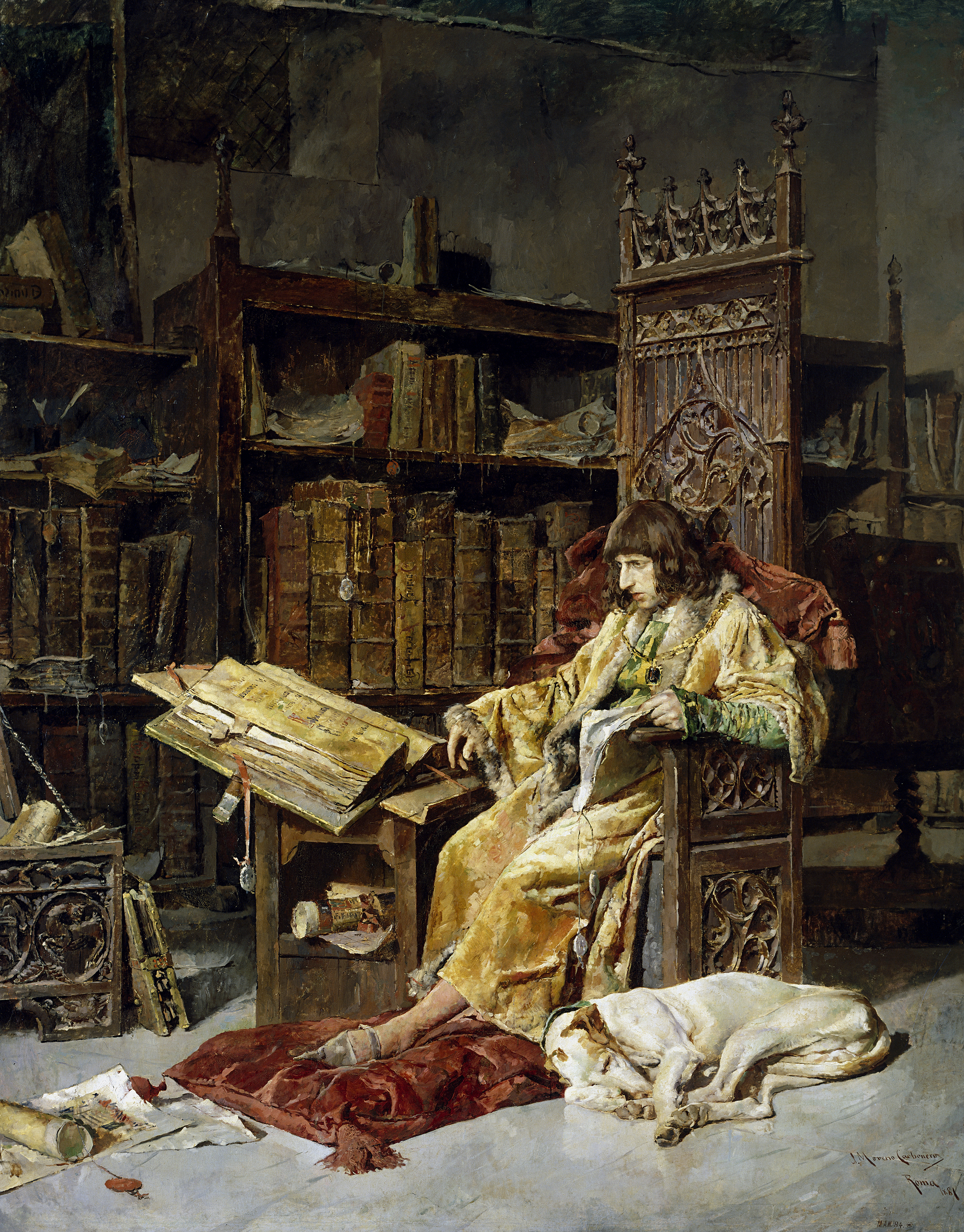
The prince don Carlos de Viana

In 1873 Moreno Carbonero visited Morocco, where he began to make African-themed paintings, influenced by Mariano Fortuny. In 1875 he traveled to Paris thanks to a scholarship granted by the local government of Málaga. In Paris he joined the workshop of the painter Jean-Léon Gérôme, known for his Academic and Orientalist works. He also got to know the famous art dealer Adolphe Goupil. Goupil introduced him to the market of small genre paintings referred to in French as tableautins. In this area he achieved his first successes and he developed a virtuoso style comparable to that of Fortuny.

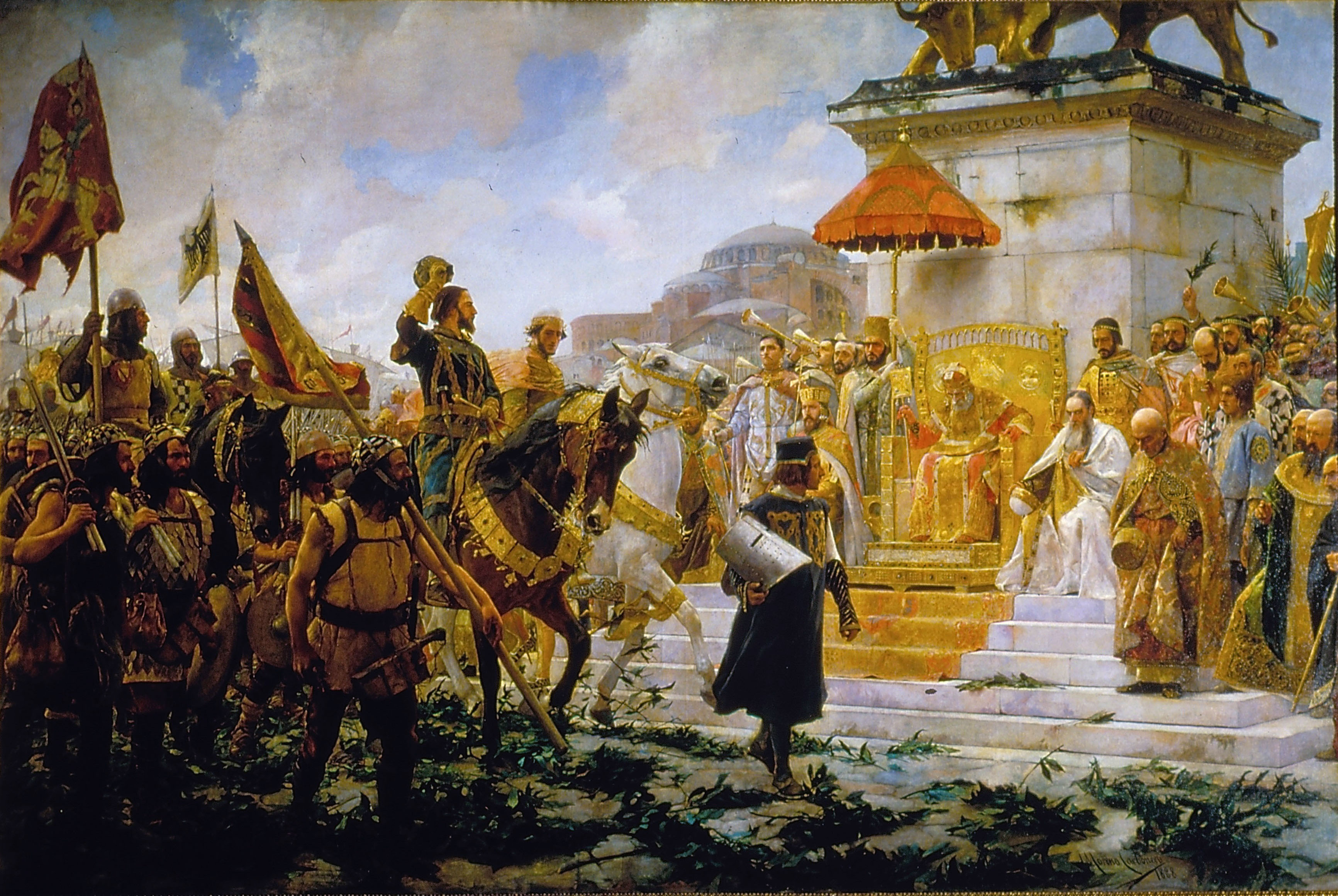
The Entry of Roger de Flor in Constantinople

In 1881 Moreno Carbonero went to study in Rome as a boarder on a stipend. After he returned to Spain, he won gold medals at the national exhibitions in 1881 with his painting The prince don Carlos de Viana and in 1884 with The Conversion of the Duke of Gandía, which he had painted during his stay in Rome.

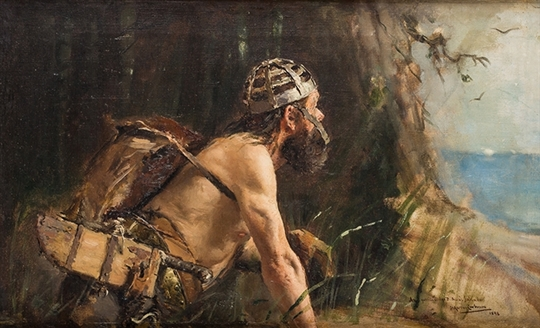
Almogavar Warrior. Late work (1898) based on a character from The Entry of Roger de Flor in Constantinople.

As his fame grew, he received commissions from various official institutions. In 1888 the Spanish Senate commissioned from him the painting The Entry of Roger de Flor in Constantinople, which is considered one of the most spectacular artworks within the genre of historical painting and still decorate the walls of the Conference Hall in the Senate. For this large-scale painting, that depicts the Italian mercenary Roger de Flor and his troops of Almogavar warriors entering the city to relieve the Byzantine emperor from the Turkish, Moreno Carbonero extensively researched in Paris about Byzantine architecture, clothes and decoration, and he used dozens of models to recreate the complete atmosphere in the Málaga bullfighting arena. Smaller paintings derived from this work, depicting individual Almogavar warriors, are known to exist.

In 1910, the Argentine Government asked him to execute a canvas with the theme of the founding of Buenos Aires to celebrate the 100th anniversary of the revolution of Argentina. King Alfonso XIII of Spain gave this work as a gift to the city of Buenos Aires. The king visited the studio of Moreno Carbonero during the creation of the work and kept in the bedroom of the Royal Palace of Madrid a design for the portrait of Juan de Garay, the founder of Buenos Aires, who was depicted in the canvas.

Moreno Carbonero was also awarded in 1888 the highest award in the Vatican Exposition and participated in the International Exhibitions in Munich and Vienna. He obtained a second medal at the Exposition Universelle of Paris in 1889, a great gold medal at the Budapest International Exhibition in 1890, an honorary diploma at the Universal Exhibition of Berlin in 1891 and the only medal at the World's Columbian Exposition of Chicago in 1893.

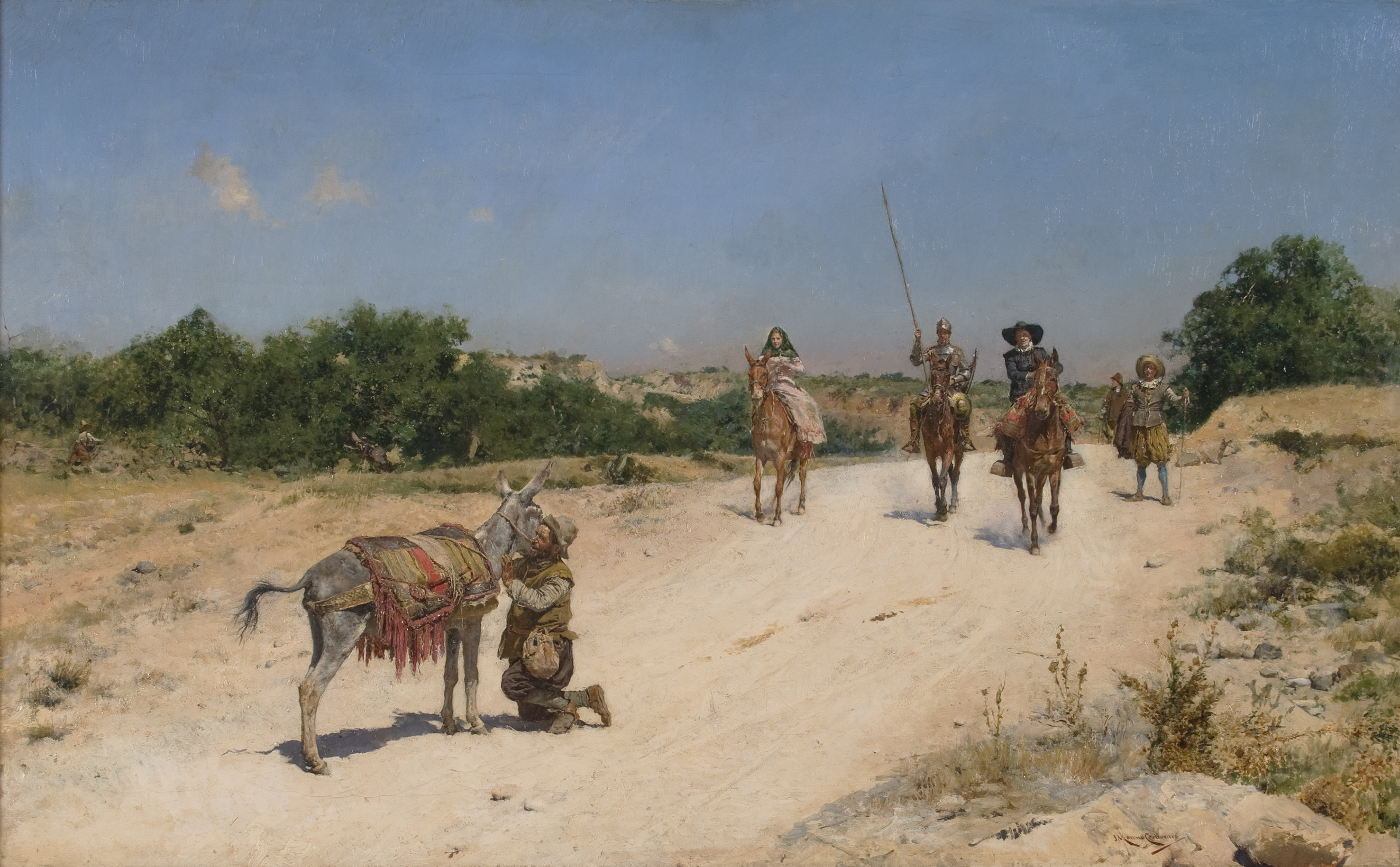
Sancho Panza meets his donkey

From 1892 he taught as professor of live drawing at the Real Academia de Bellas Artes de San Fernando and he was also an Academician of the same organisation. In 1924 he was made Hijo Predilecto.

After his death in Madrid on 15 April 1942, his body was transferred to Málaga, where he is buried in the San Miguel cemetery. In 1958 a monument created by Mariano Benlliure was erected in the Puerta Oscura gardens to honour the artist.

== Style and technique ==
José Moreno Carbonero was principally a history painter. He was further a painter of portraits, genre scenes, some landscapes, vedutas and still lifes. His work was eclectic in style and was mainly influenced by the work of Fortuny. In his portraits he used a realistic style.

As a history painter Moreno Carbonero excelled through his clear drawing and clean brushstrokes. In his history paintings he was influenced by the genre painting on small format that he practised in his early years. He showed a preference for leaving aside the grand events of history in favour of depicting the feelings and reactions of participants in events from the past. He cared a lot about the historical accuracy of his history paintings. This explains why he asked that the painting The founding of Buenos Aires be returned to him after it was delivered to the local government in Buenos Aires in 1909. He had read more about the history of the city after he had first completed the work and wanted to make substantial changes to it so it would be more historically accurate. He returned the reworked painting to the city in 1924.

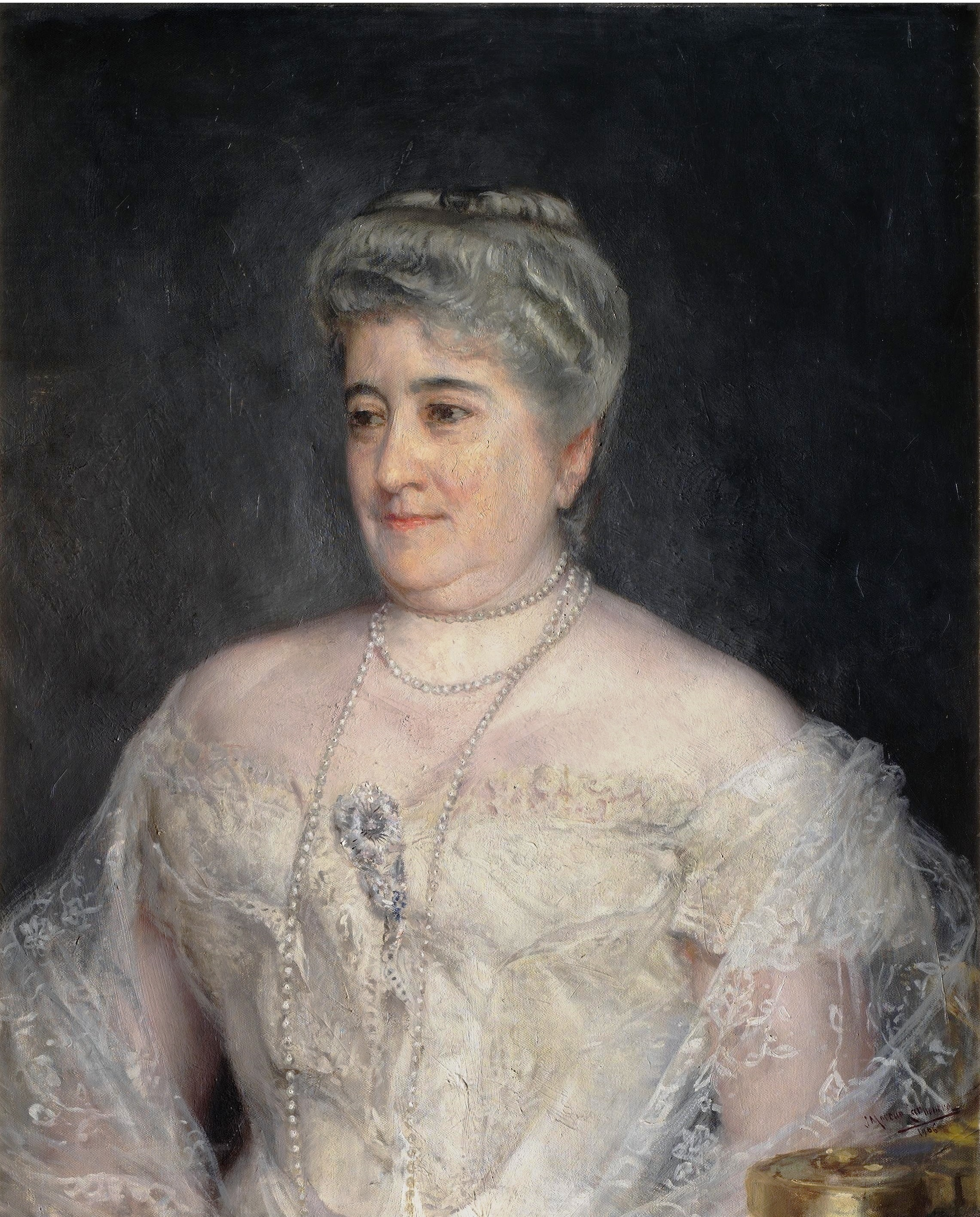
Portrait of Purificación Fontán

As a portrait painter, Moreno Carbonero created elegant portraits of personnages from the high society of Madrid. These portraits were characterised by their sophisticated and sumptuous treatment of the sitters.

Moreno Carbonero devoted himself in the first decades of his career to genre painting. His genre paintings took as their subject the daily life of people or scenes from the Spanish Golden Age of literature, and especially the story of Don Quixote.

The collection of the Museo de Bellas Artes of Málaga holds more than 30 works of José Moreno Carbonero.

== Gallery ==
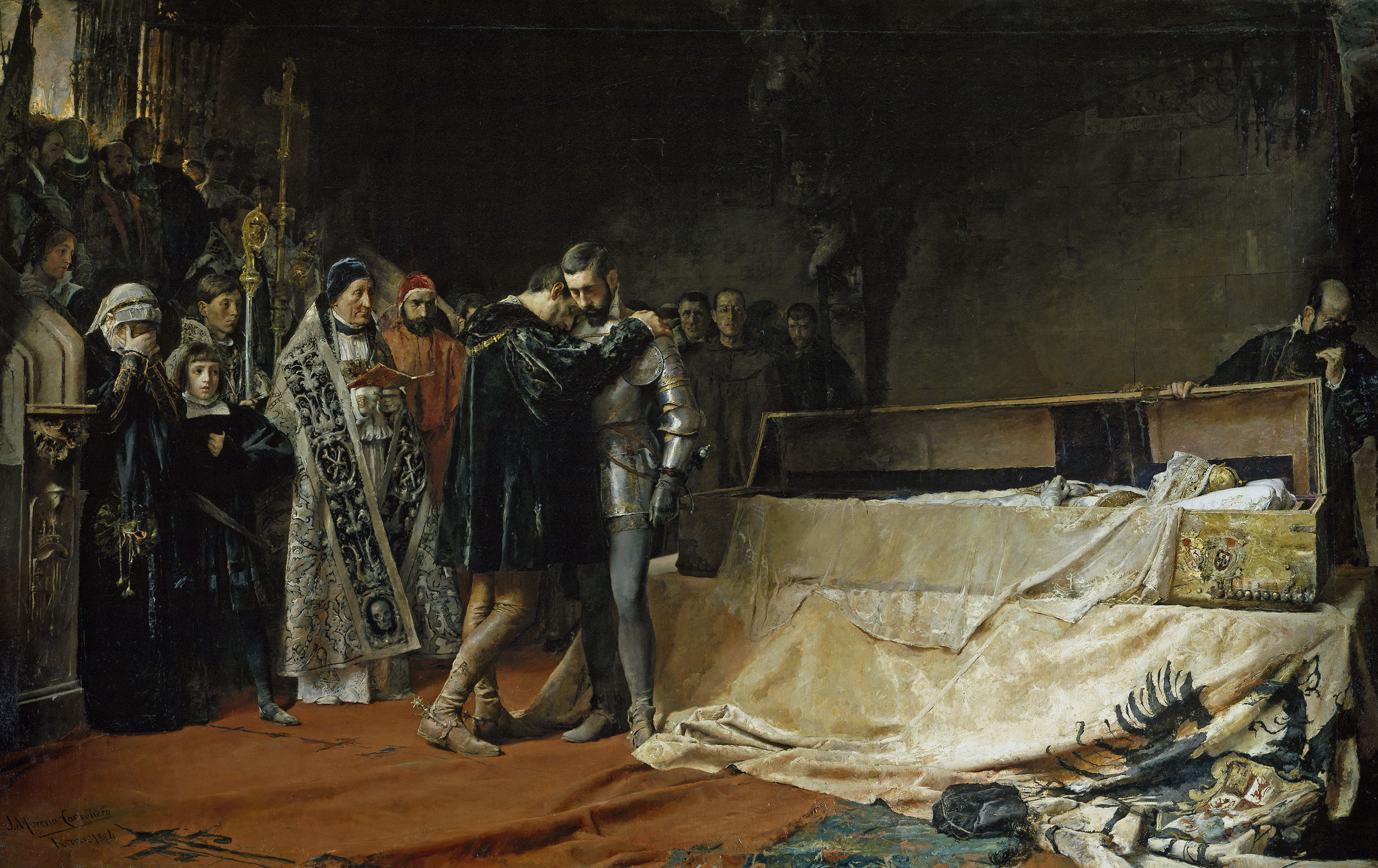
The Conversion of the Duke of Gandía

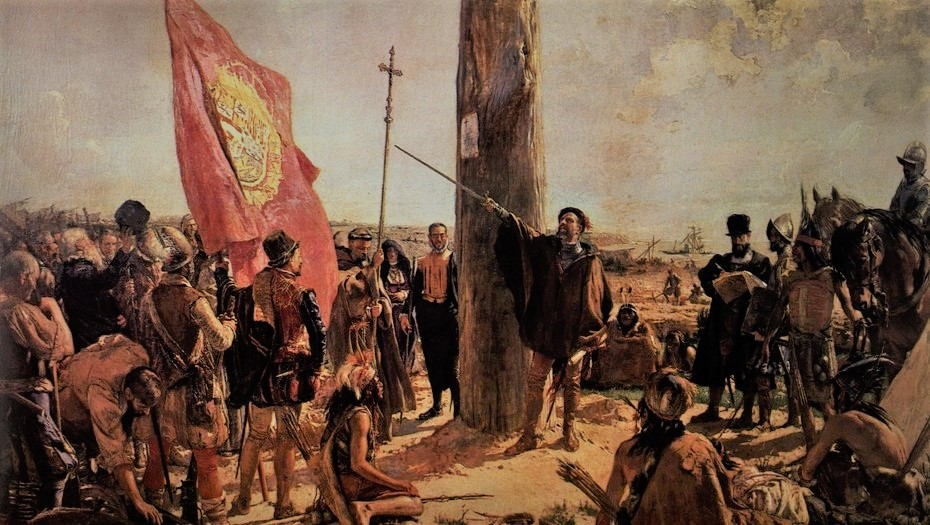
The Founding of Buenos Aires

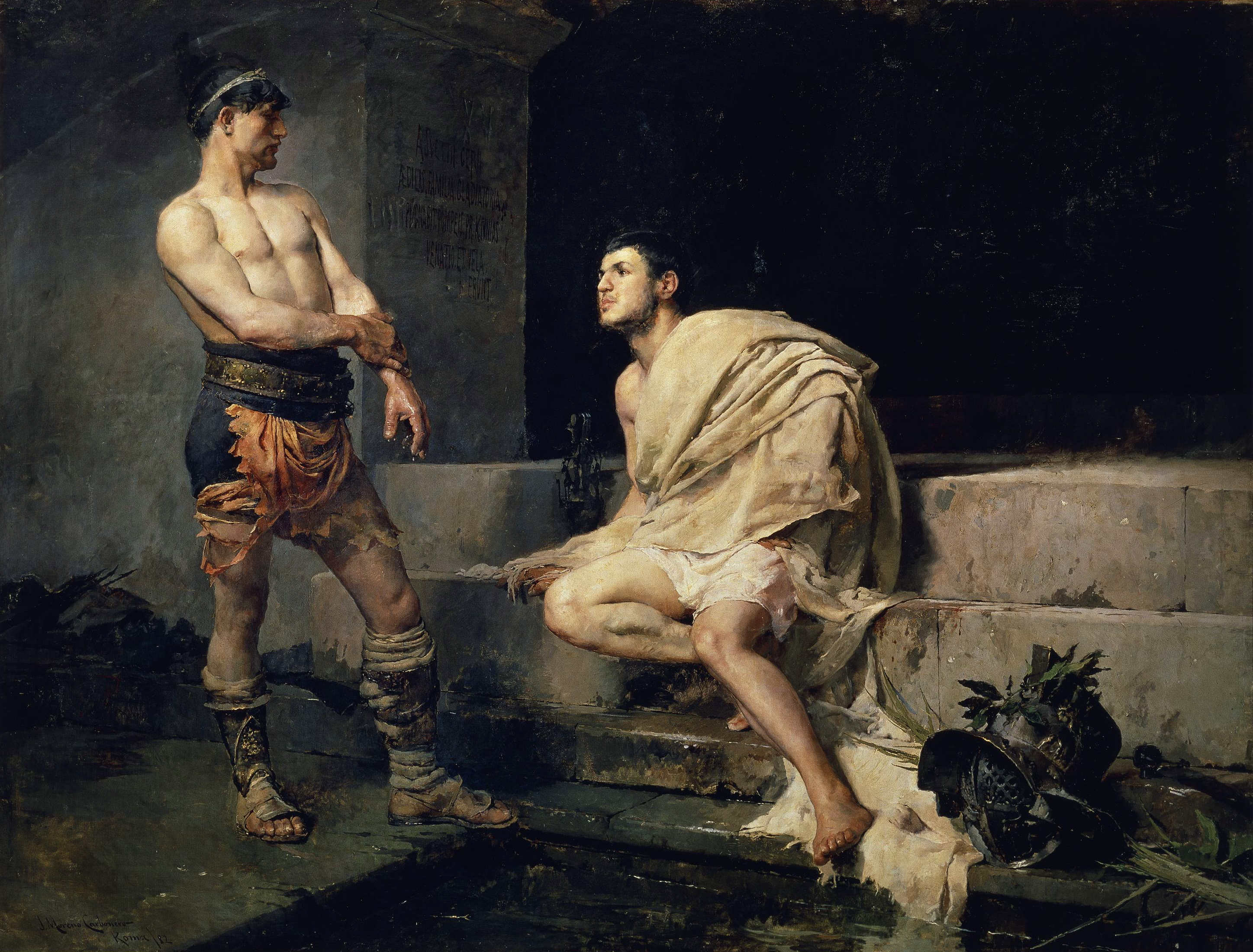
Gladiators after the Combat

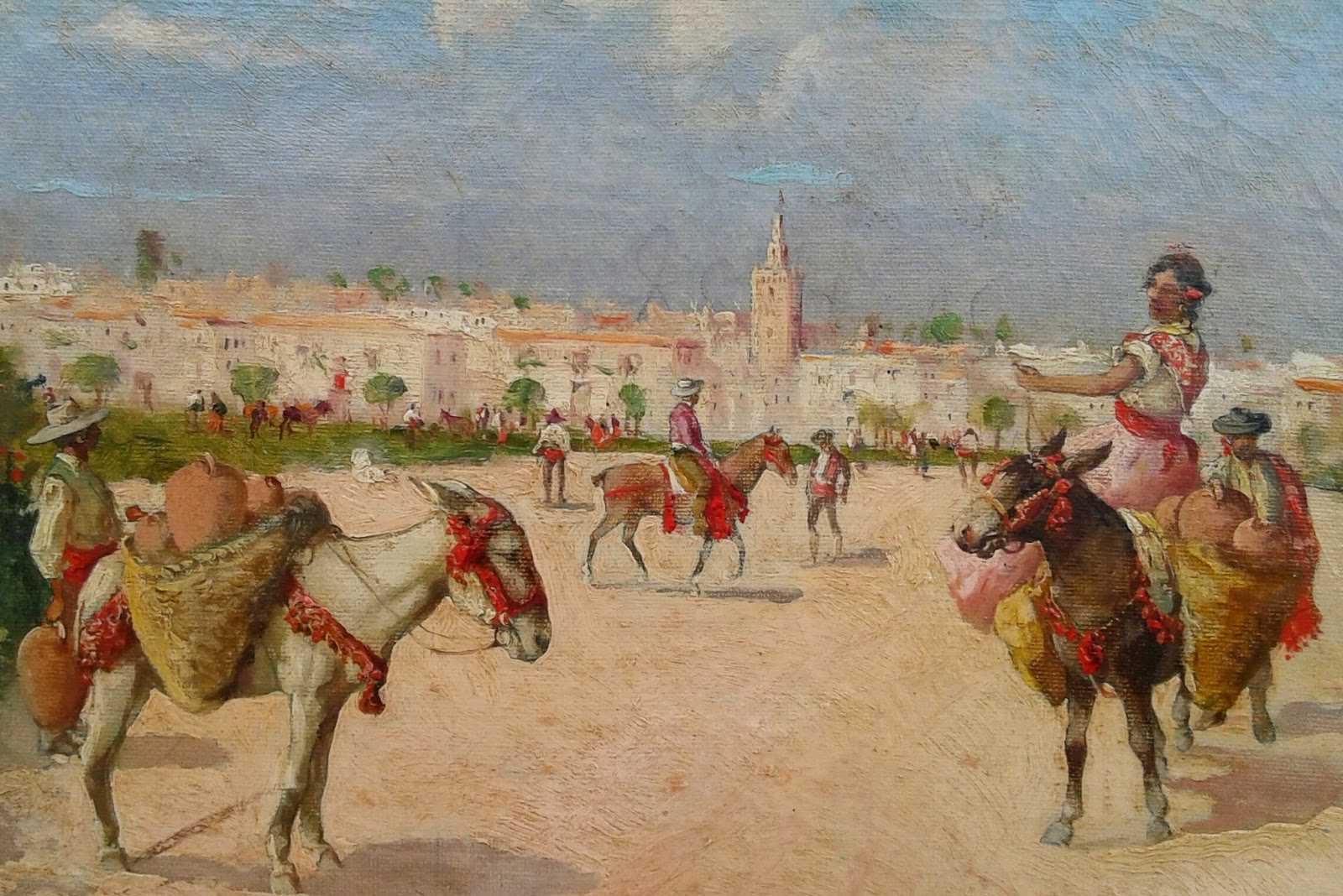
Water Carriers in the Outskirts of Alcalá de Guadaíra

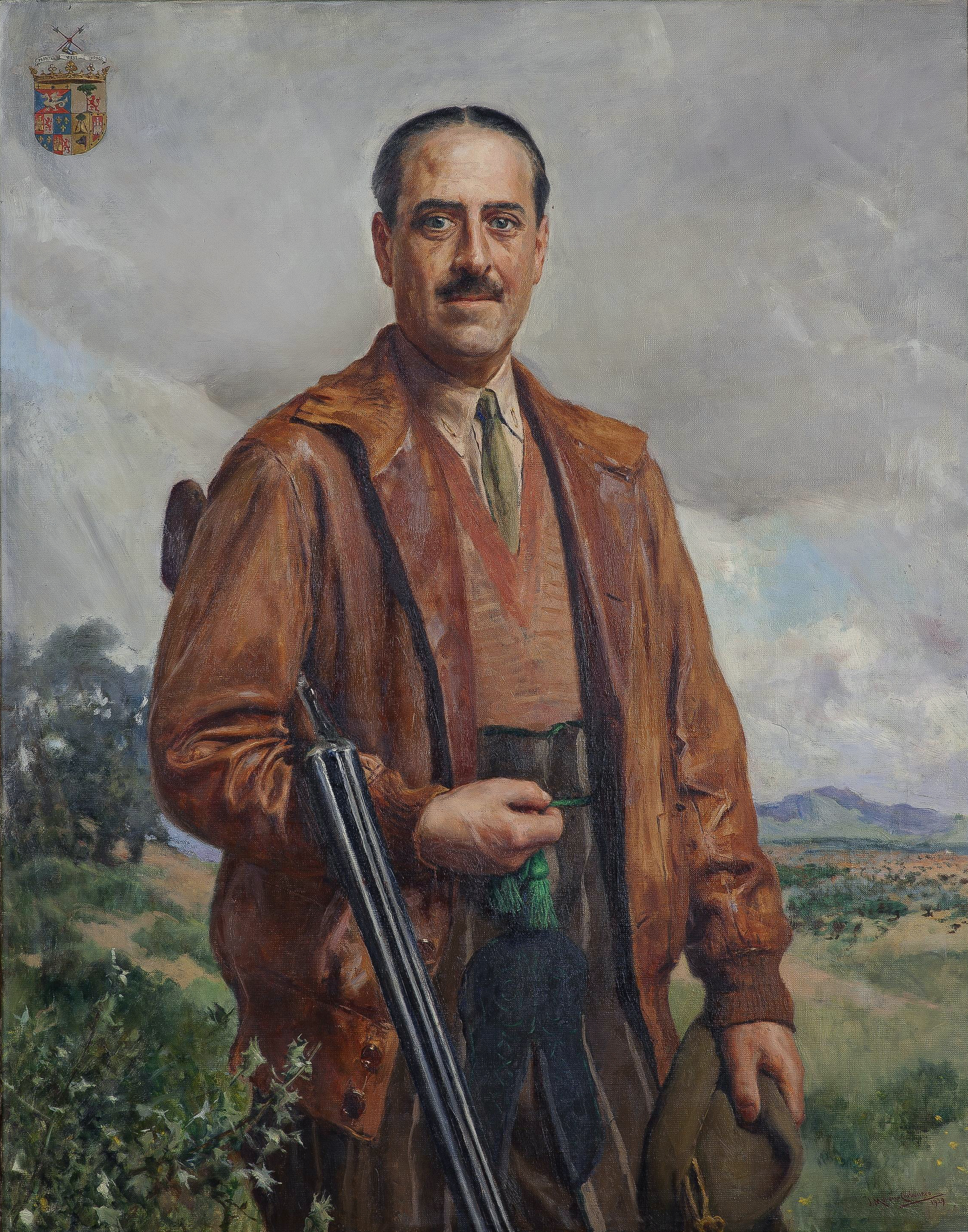
Álvaro Drake, Marquis of Villablanca

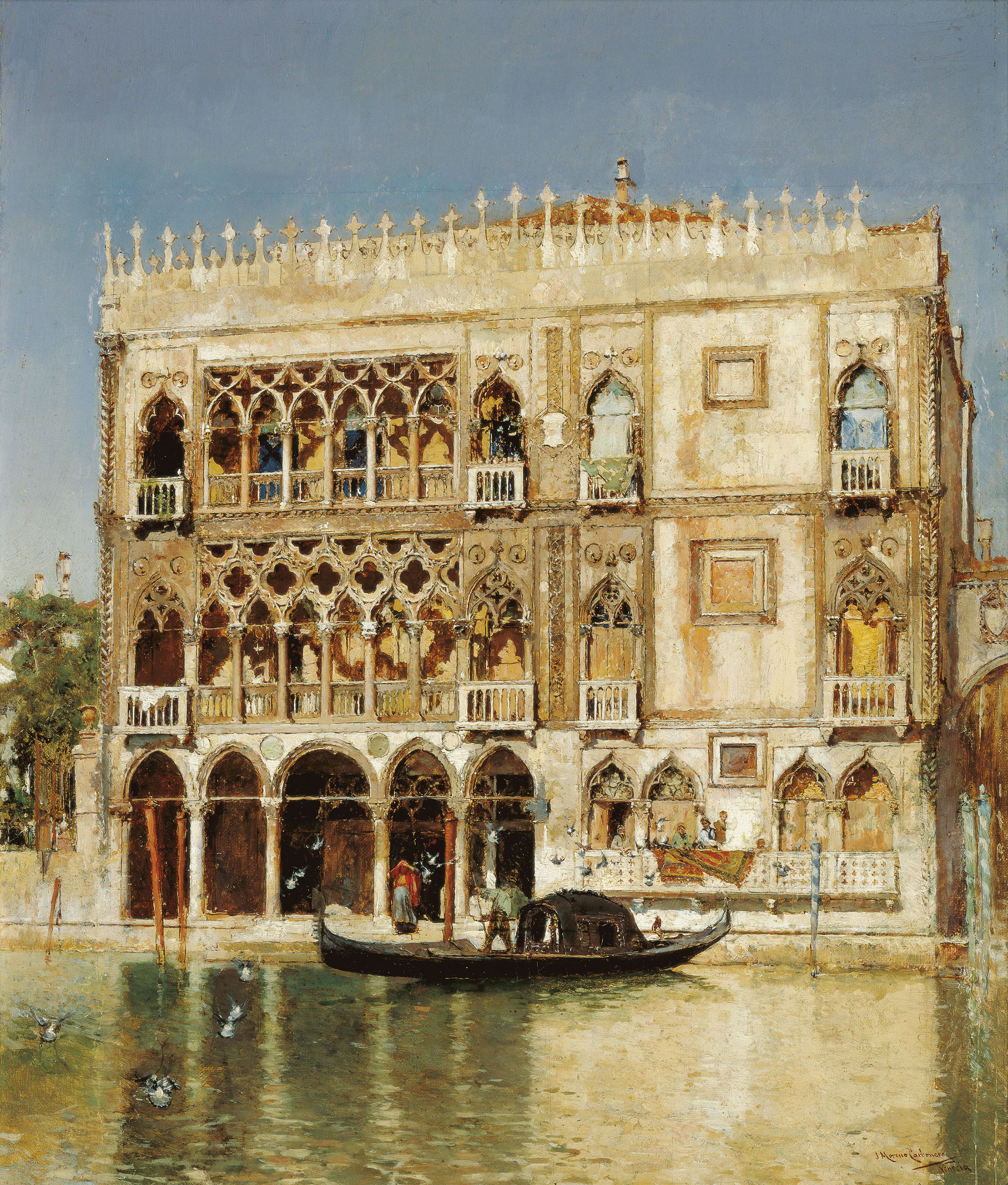
Ca d'Oro

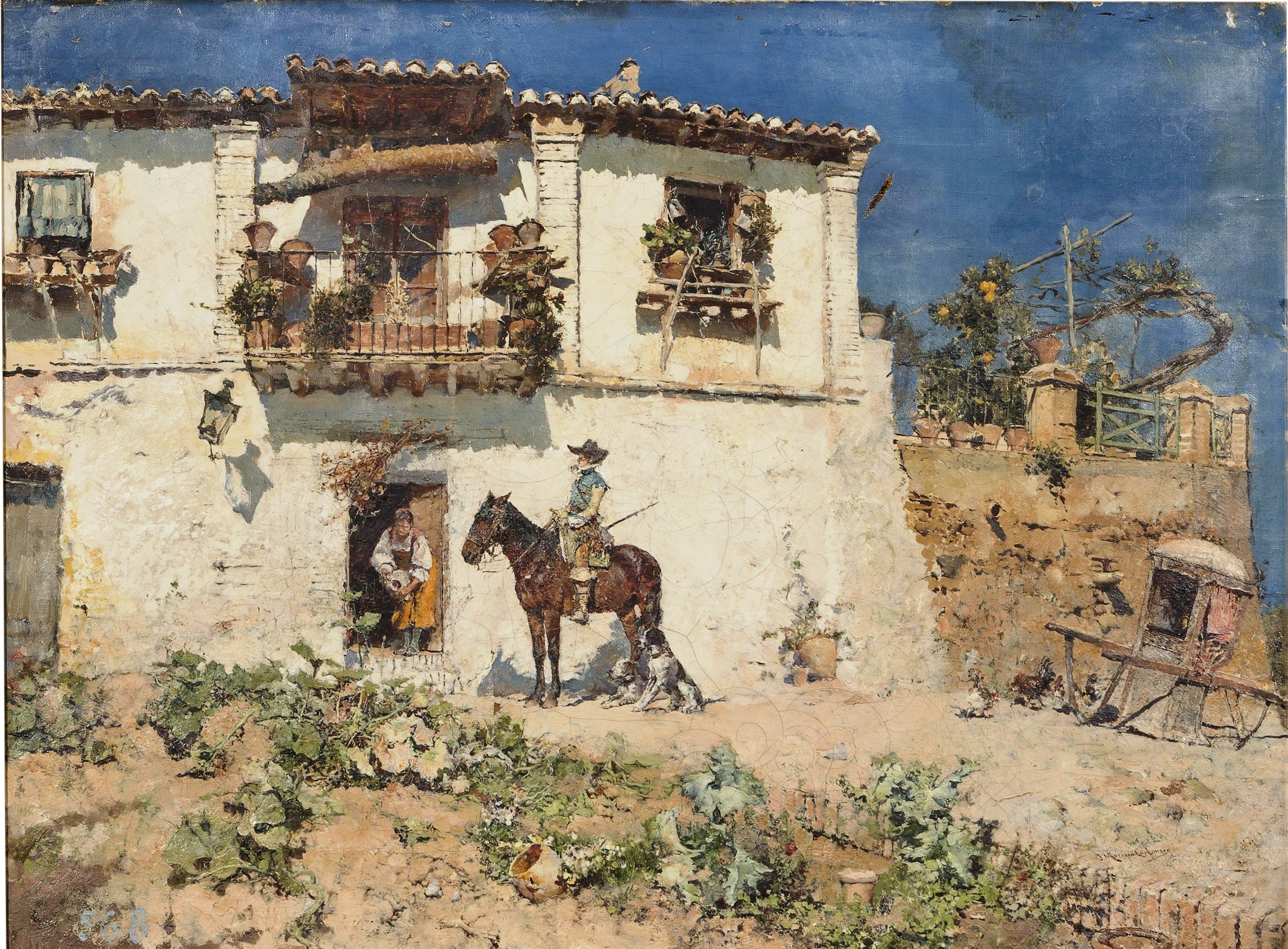
A Glass of Water
