= Isla Canela =

Island in Southern Spain

Coordinates: 37°10′23″N 7°22′40″W

Isla Canela is a small island located south of the town of Ayamonte, in Andalusia, Spain, in Province of Huelva. The mouth of the Guadiana River is next to the island, and Portugal can be easily seen from Isla Canela. Isla Canela is set within an area of coastal scenery with beaches, dunes, and salt marshes.

Beaches and Activities

The 7 kilometre beach is of fine, golden sand. There is an 18-hole golf club, and a marina and commercial centre which provide amenities such as shops, bars and restaurants. Outdoor pursuits such as sailing, canoeing, motor boats, tennis, fishing and diving are available in the area.

Cuisine

The region is famous for its grilled fish, especially sardines and deep fried calamares (squid).

Climate

The climate in Isla Canela is mainly Mediterranean, with generally hot and dry summers and mild winters. The area is considered a year-round destination.

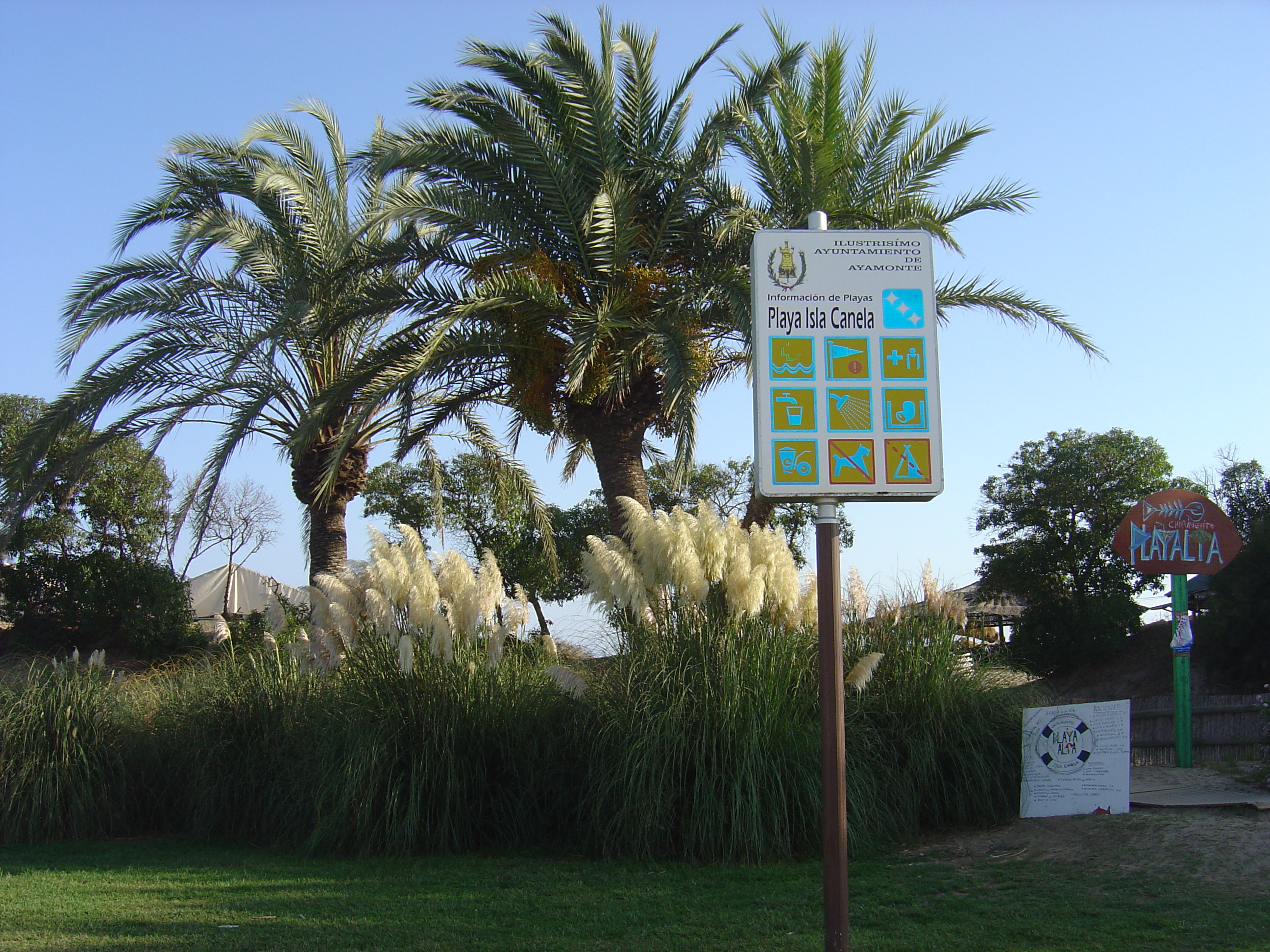
Entrance to the beach on Isla Canela.

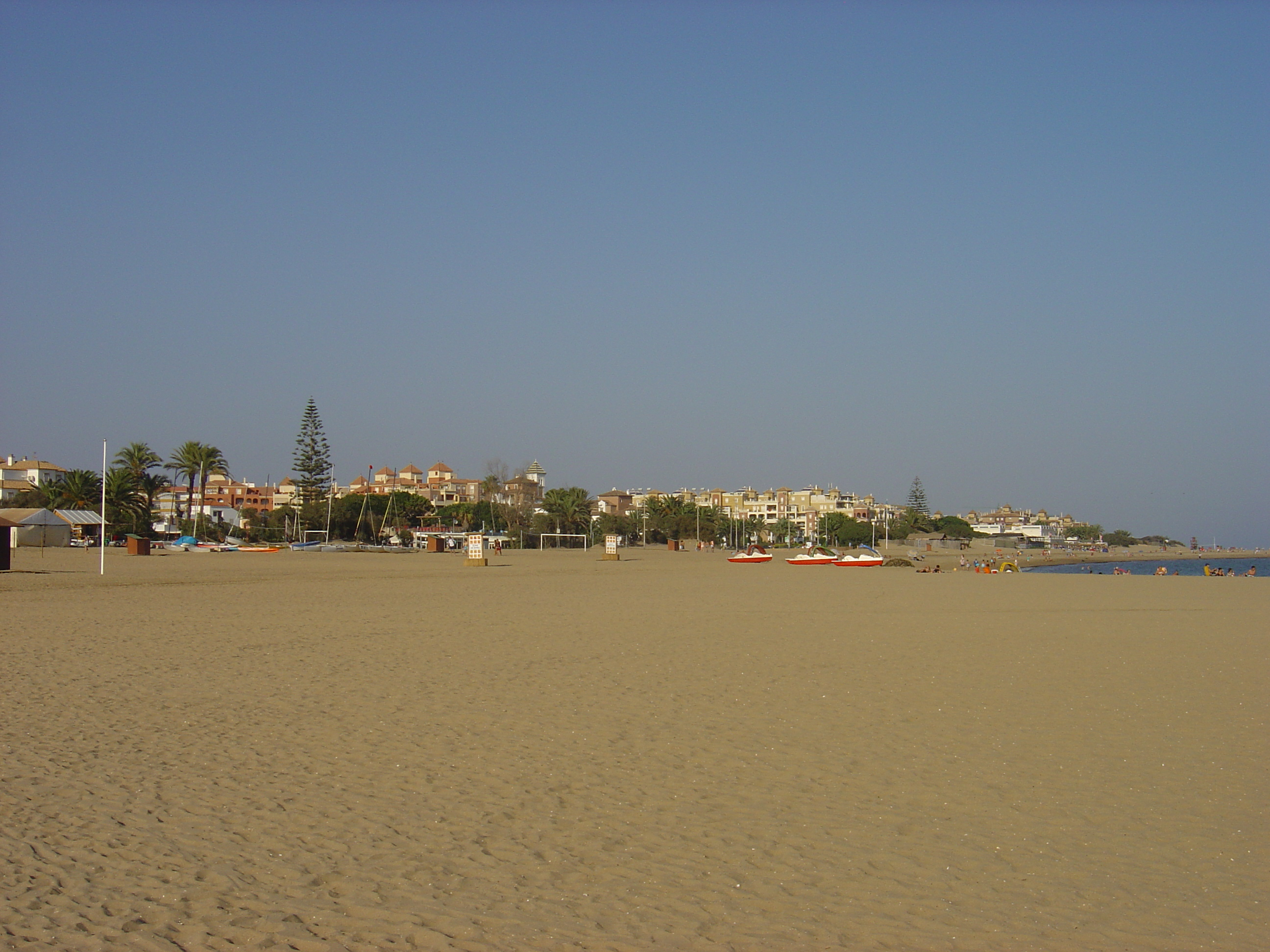
Beach resorts on Isla Canela.

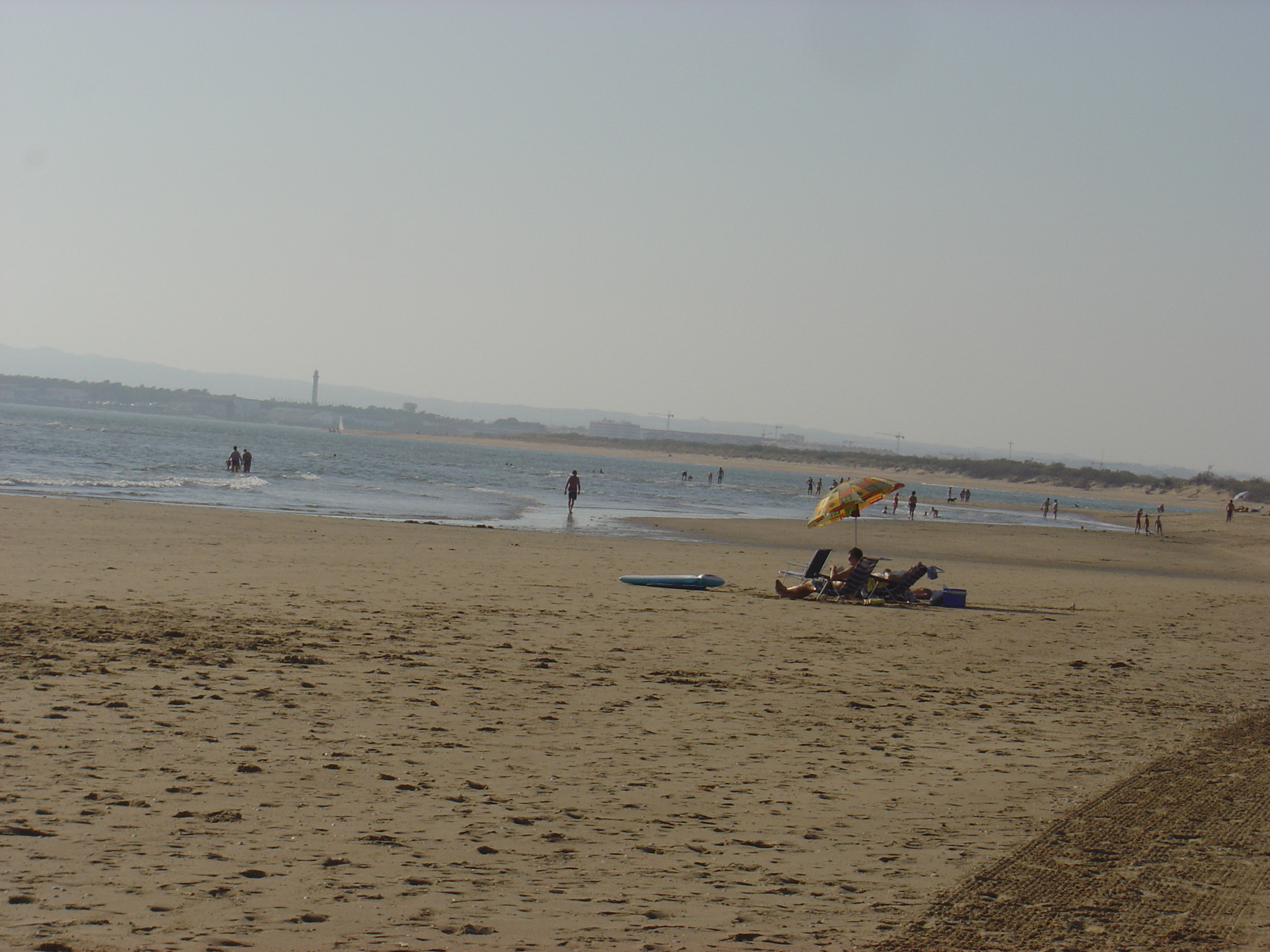
The beach on Isla Canela. Portugal can be seen at distance.
