= Alonso Sánchez =

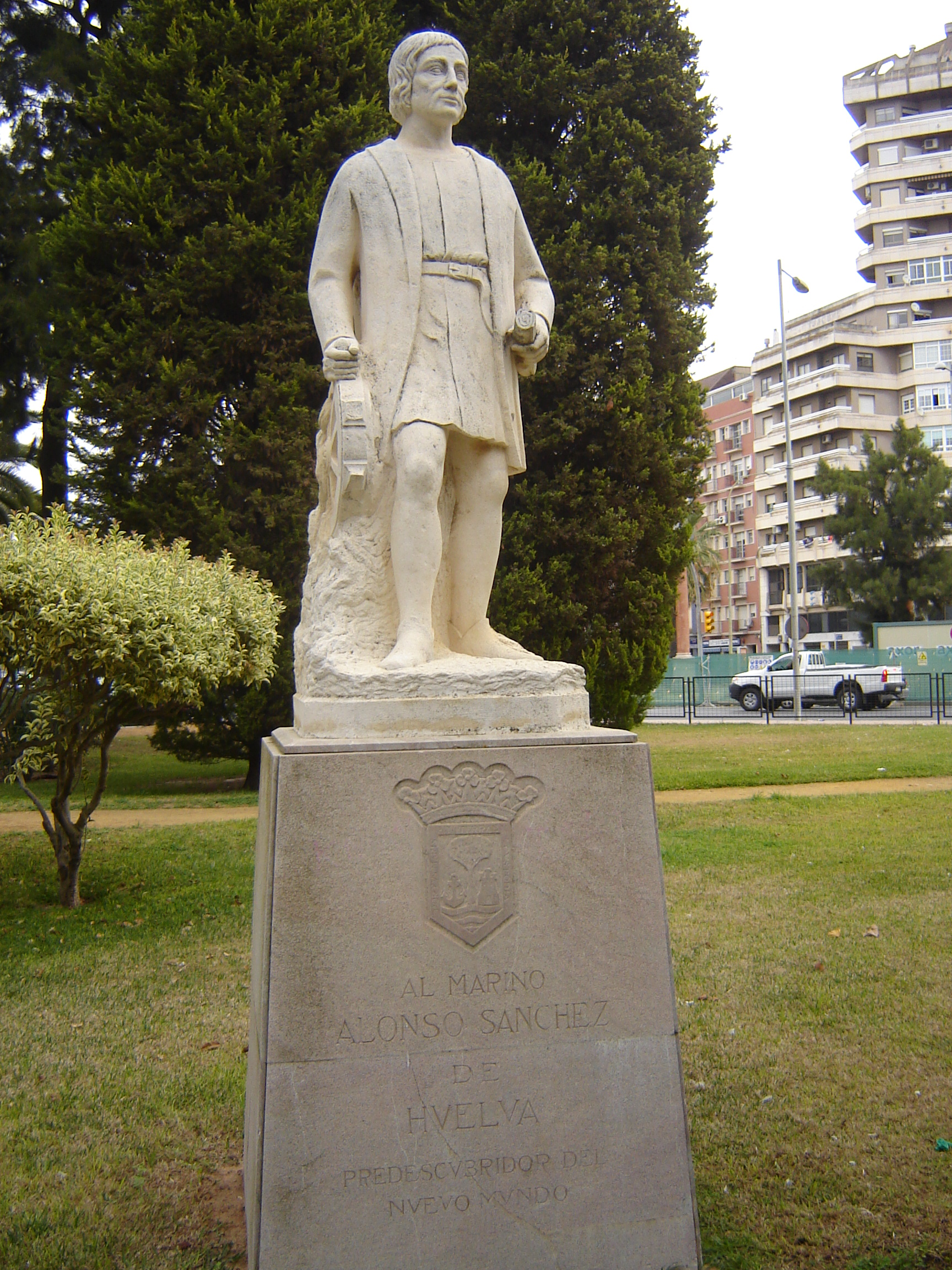
Statue of Alonso Sánchez by León Ortega, in Huelva, Spain

Alonso Sánchez de Huelva was an alleged 15th-century mariner and merchant born in Huelva, Spain, on Andalusia's Atlantic coast.

After the European discovery of America, several rumors started to spread, especially among the conquistadores, claiming that America had not been discovered by Columbus, but that its existence was known at least 20 years before 1492. Bartolomé de las Casas (1484–1566) had indeed heard several of those claims, but limited himself to record them in the 1540s, in Historia de las Indias, which was not published until after his death. Inca Garcilaso de la Vega (1539–1616) was the first to name, in 1609, one of these mysterious alleged first European discoverers of America: Alonso Sánchez de Huelva.

== Purported voyage to America ==
The most famous of these accounts is that of the Duchess of Medina Sidonia (1936–2008), who believed that Columbus' discovery was the instrument by means of which the Catholic Monarchs of Spain were able to officialize the discovery (supposedly made well before 1492, and kept secret hitherto). According to the Duchess, the international political situation of the second half of the 15th century was not favourable to the Catholic Monarchs, who before 1492 would have faced strong opposition to any claim over the newly found lands, especially from Portugal, France and the Holy See, the latter two at war with the Kingdom of Aragon. In order to ensure the ownership of those new lands, and lacking the resources for facing the consequences of an early claim, they waited until 1492, when Alexander VI, an Aragonese, was elected pope, thus ensuring the papacy siding with them. In 1492 they would have sent Columbus on an official voyage to the West, knowing that he would find new territories and lay claim for them in the name of the Catholic Monarchs. The Duchess believed Alonso Sánchez to be the true discoverer, offering several stories, contemporary records and weak proofs for her claims.

Indeed, any of those stories are widely regarded as false.

According to the tale reported in 1609 by Garcilaso in his book Comentarios Reales de los Incas, Alonso Sánchez used to sail quite often between the Canary Islands, Madeira and Spain, engaged in some sort of triangular commerce. In 1484 (or a year more or less), while on passage between the Canary Islands and Madeira, he was surprised by a fierce storm that blew his ship drastically off-course into unknown waters of the mid-Atlantic. The small ship, slightly damaged by the storm, encountered unfavorable winds and currents that dragged it further to the southwest. After 28 or 29 days, Sánchez and his frightened crew finally sighted land, probably the island of Hispaniola (Santo Domingo), where they landed to determine their position, document what happened and what they saw, replenish their stocks of fresh water and wood, before returning to Spain. During that return trip, which took very long, the ship ran out of fresh water and food, men became very ill, and only five out of the initial 17 men on board, including Sánchez, survived to meet and tell Christopher Columbus of their adventure, before all finally dying of exhaustion in his house.

Later chroniclers narrated instead that Sánchez and his crew continued along the unknown coast until they encountered signs of human habitation, and, at long last, disembarked at a coastal village where they were hospitably received. The natives were impressed with these strangers chiefly because they were taller in stature than themselves and bearded. (The natives were uniformly beardless.) More significantly, the natives communicated to the Spaniards that their mythos held that, eventually, their gods would come from the sea to visit them. The natives gave their "divine" visitors food and gold; they even offered the strangers their women as gifts. (Some believe that syphilis was introduced to the Old World through these acts of generosity.)

After a short sojourn among the natives, the Spaniards began to prepare for their return trip. Sánchez made certain calculations based on his ship's log and his estimates of his ship's course on its outbound leg. The return voyage required about a month at sea, and they hardly made it to Porto Santo Island, in Madeira. It was while recovering from their voyage in Porto Santo that Alonso met Christopher Columbus (who lived in Porto Santo during the 1480s), to whom he related the story of his amazing adventure.

Some believe that the information provided by Sánchez, regarding headings and distances, influenced Columbus' plans. Others believe that Alonso Sánchez never existed, and that he was simply part of an attempt by the Pinzón brothers to discredit Columbus' skills as a navigator.

Indeed, no document from the time tells about any Alonso Sánchez from Huelva, and everything known about him comes from the writers that told his story well after Columbus' death. Moreover, several authors have claimed Sánchez to be from Portugal, Biscay or some other parts of Andalusia. However, some historians, starting with José Ceballos in 1762, have claimed the account by Inca Garcilaso de la Vega to be true.

In the city of Huelva, Sánchez's purported birthplace, there are a number of memorials to him. There is a statue of Sánchez in the city park that commemorates the voyages of Columbus, 12 October Park, by sculptor León Ortega. There is also a smaller park in Huelva named for him, as well as a public high school.
