= Ayamonte =

- Municipality
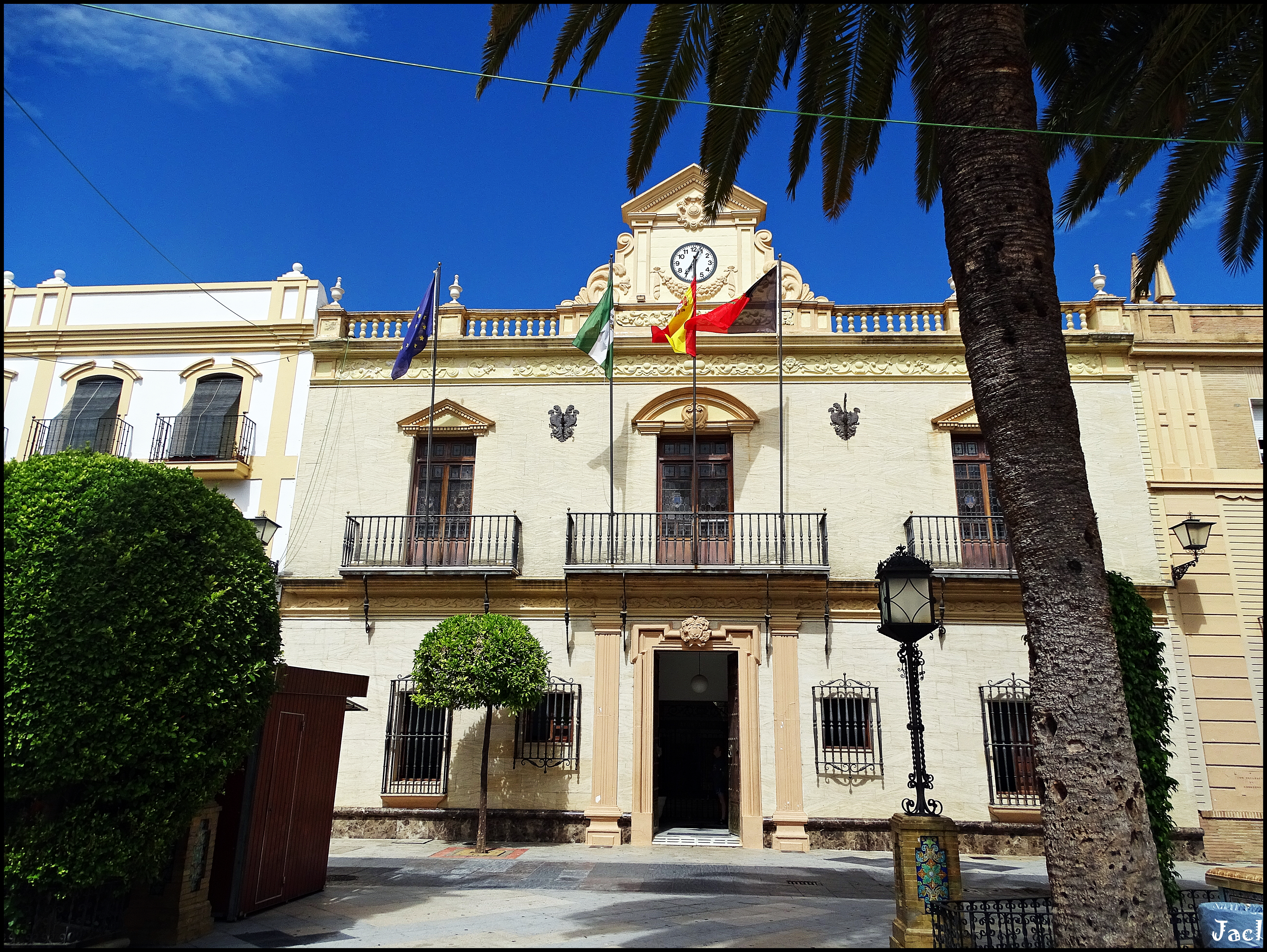
- Town hall

- Flag Coat of arms

- Location within Spain Location within Andalusia
- Coordinates: 37°12′N 7°24′W
- Country: Spain
- Autonomous community: Andalusia
- Province: Huelva

Government
  - Alcaldesa: Natalia Santos Mena

Area
  - Total: 142 km^{2} (55 sq mi)
- Elevation: 63 m (207 ft)

Population (2025-01-01)
  - Total: 22,001
  - Density: 155/km^{2} (401/sq mi)
- Demonym(s): Ayamontino, na
- Time zone: UTC+1 (CET)
  - Summer (DST): UTC+2 (CEST)
- Postal code: 21400
- Website: ayto-ayamonte.es

Ayamonte (Spanish pronunciation: [aʝaˈmonte]; Portuguese: Aiamonte) is a town and municipality of Spain belonging to the province of Huelva, Andalusia. It is located near the border with Portugal on the mouth of the Guadiana River. According to the 2025 municipal register, the city has a population of 22,001 inhabitants.

== History ==
In the municipality are located parts of the megalithic site La Torre-La Janera which is assumed to date back to the 5th millennium BC. The town was seized away from Muslim control in 1240 during the reign of Sancho II of Portugal, and it was donated afterwards to the Order of Santiago. Ayamonte became part of the Crown of Castile in 1263.

Fishing and salting of tuna and sardine was already practised in Ayamonte since the Middle Ages. The town suffered due to the War with Portugal and the plague pandemics in the 17th century. In the following century, Catalans and other eastern merchants installed in the town and gave impetus to the local canning and salt industry.

== Location ==
The township of Ayamonte preserves its old medieval quarter in the central district of the town, with many very narrow streets and historical buildings; this central area is a designated car-free zone.

The beach area of Ayamonte is Isla Canela and is reached by a causeway across the Marismas del Guadiana; the marismas (salt marshes) are a wildlife reserve, providing a home to many waterfowl, including herons and flamingos. Isla Canela is built along several kilometers of sandy beaches, and provides an area for windsurfing, kitesurfing and sailing. There are a number of golf courses in and around the area, including one built into the Marismas itself.

== Transport ==
The ferry link between Ayamonte and Vila Real de Santo António was the traditional crossing point between Spain and Portugal. A modern bridge over the Guadiana River has now been built to the north of the town, linking the motorway systems of both countries, but the ferry still runs and provides an inexpensive mode of transport between the two countries.

== Culture ==
The city is also famous for its local festivities, the "Fiestas de las Angustias", in honor of their patron "Nuestra Señora de las Angustias". The festivities in the beginning of September are a moment of celebration not only from the Ayamontin population, but also for many Andalucians, and Portuguese. The festivities are graced by the local band, "Banda Ciudad de Ayamonte" and the Portuguese "Banda da Sociedade Filarmónica Progresso e Labor Samouquense" from the Portuguese village of Samouco.

== Sights ==
There are several historical monuments in the city, such as the 16th-century fortifications of the Baluarte de las Angustias, the 16th-century church of Nuestra Señora de las Angustias and the 17th-century church of Nuestra Señora de las Mercedes. The Plaza de la Laguna, which dates back to the 18th century, is home to many ornate azulejo tiles.

== Gallery ==
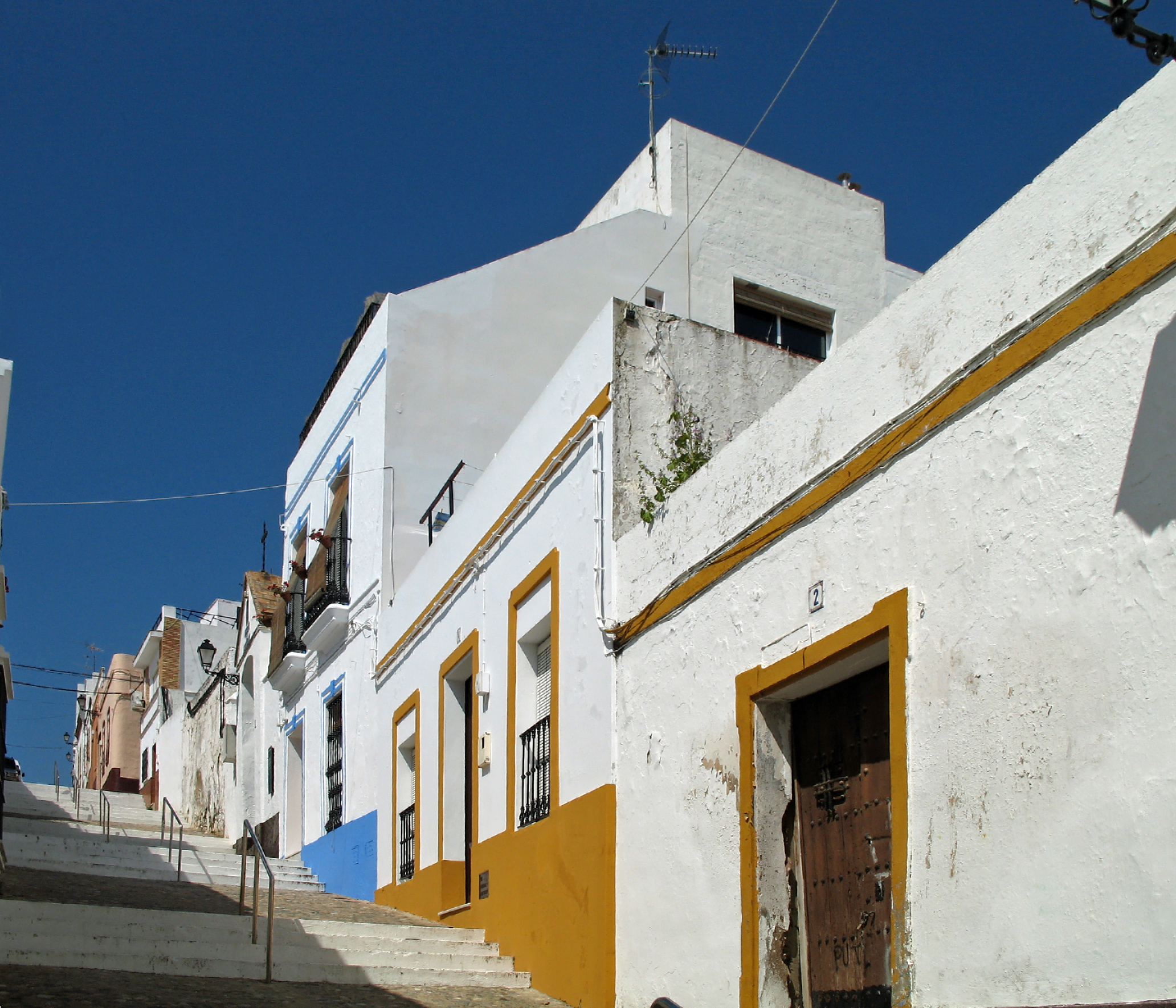
Street in Ayamonte

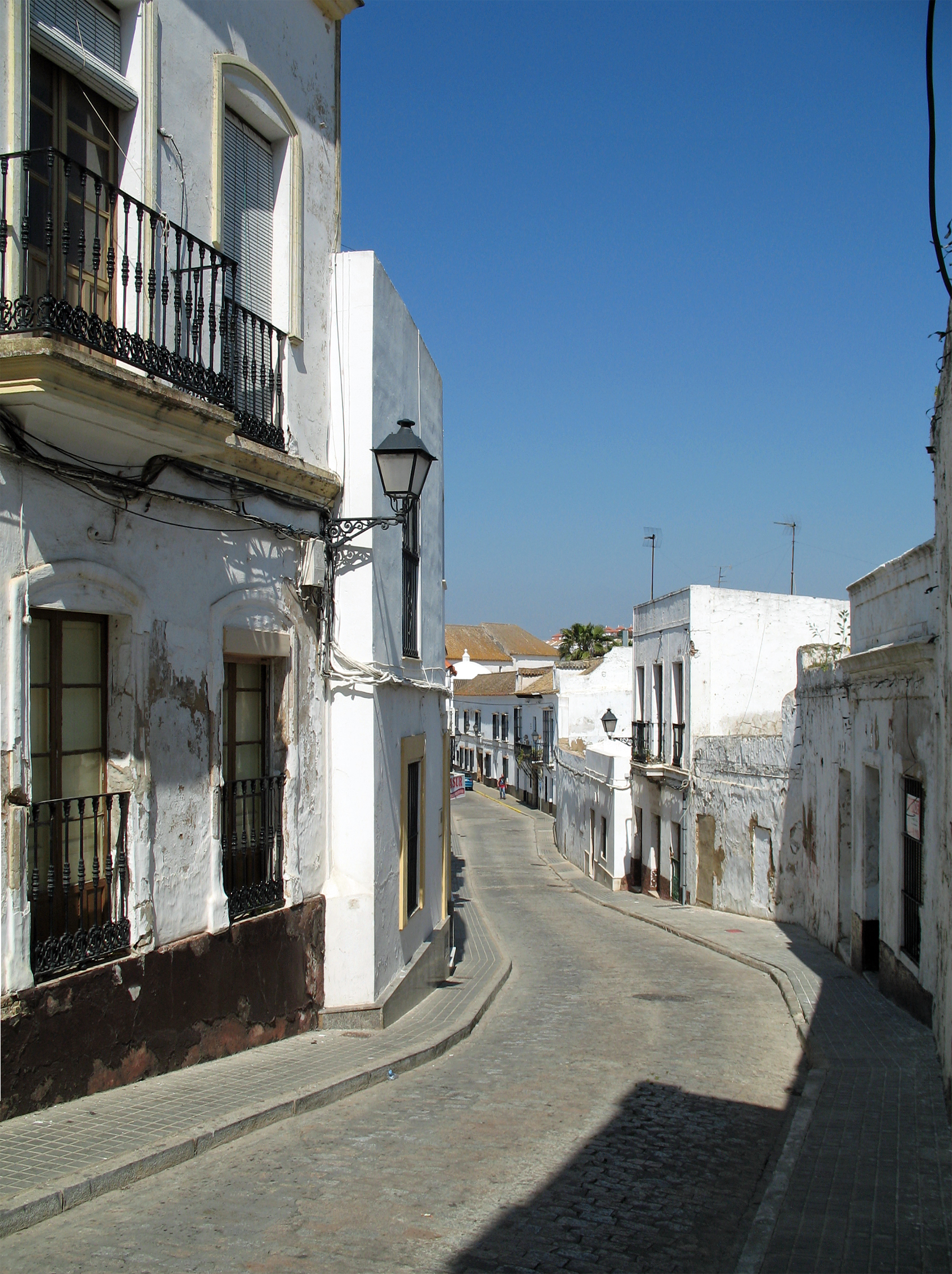
Street in Ayamonte

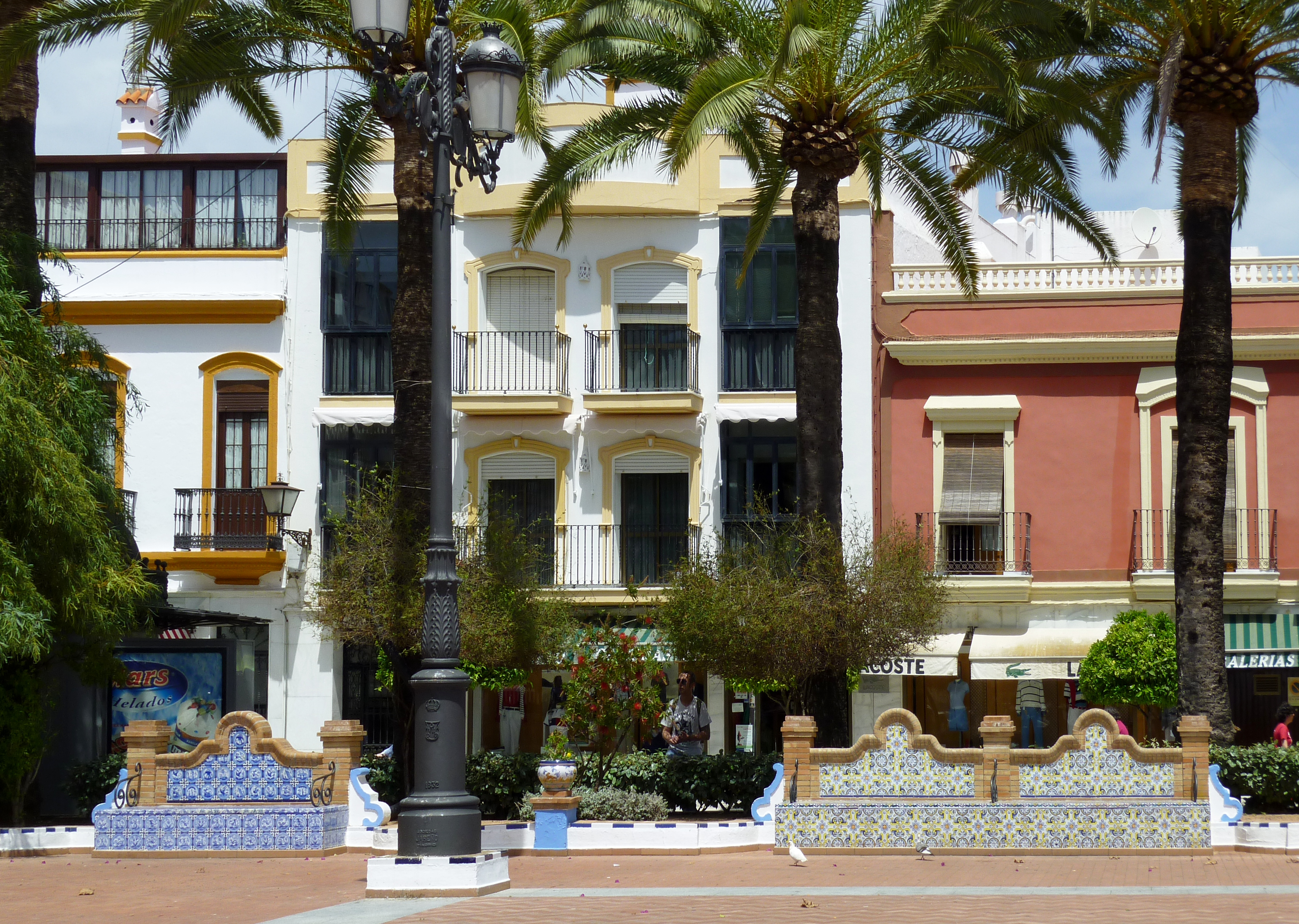
Paseo de la Ribera

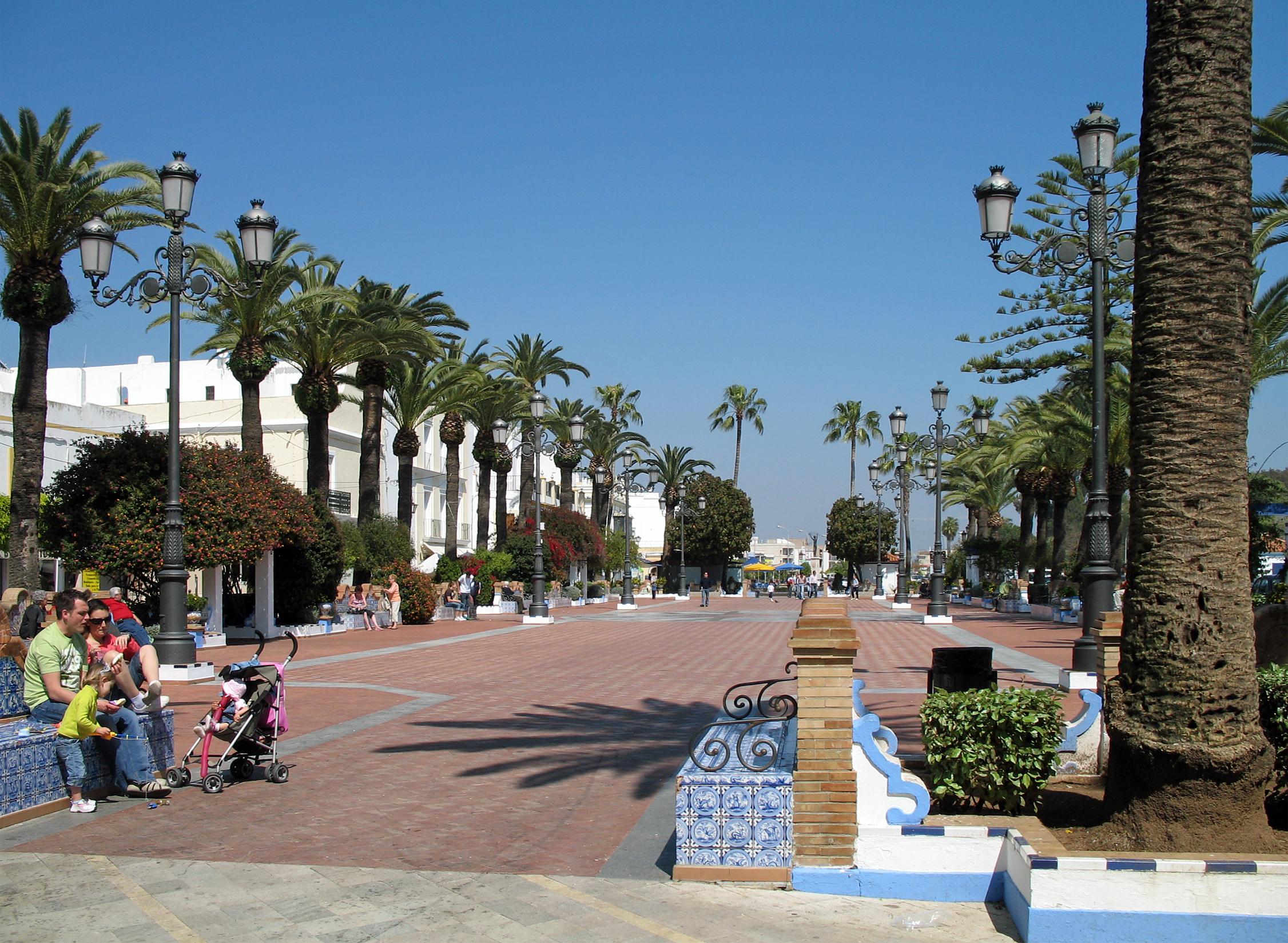
Plaza de la Coronación

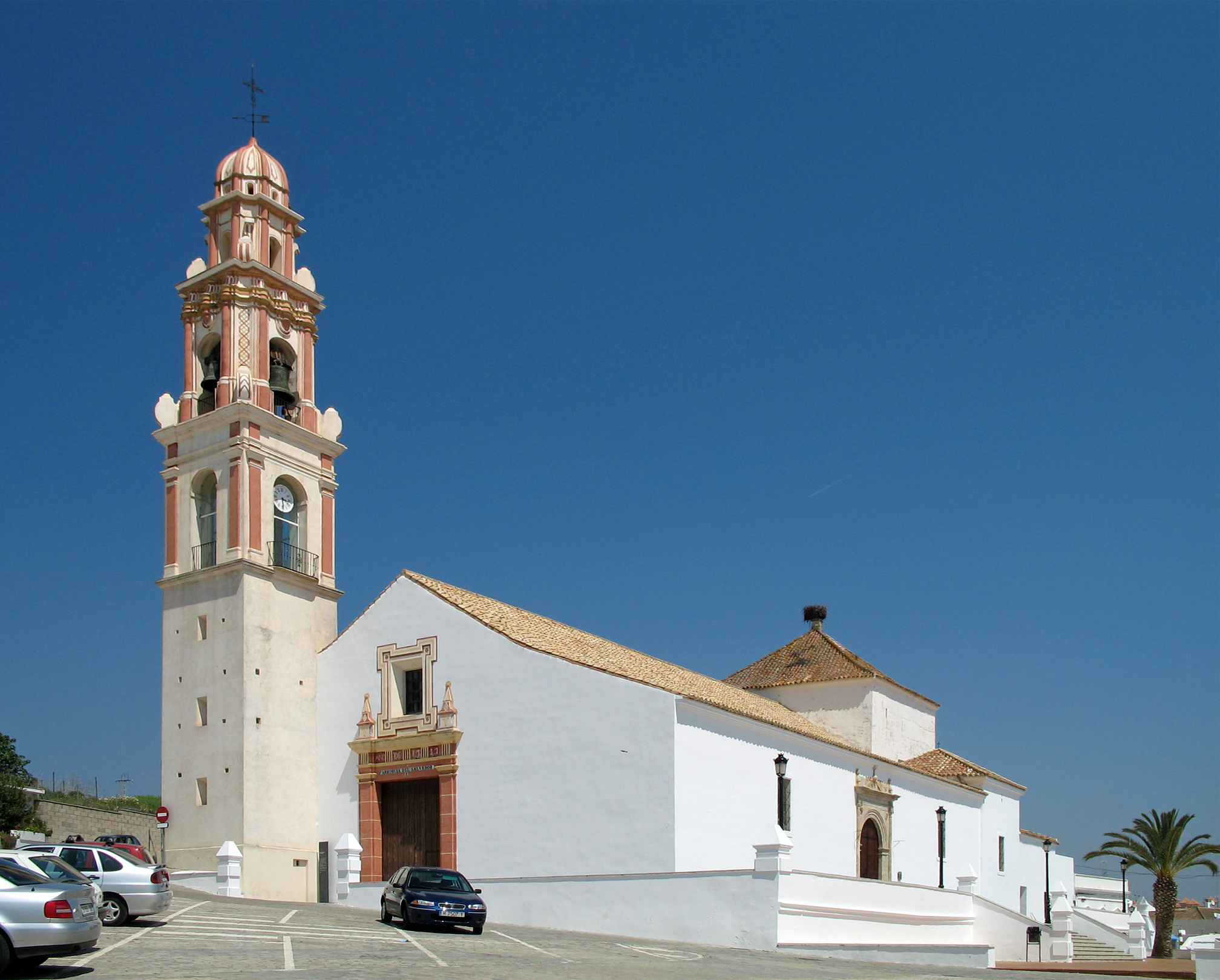
El Salvador church

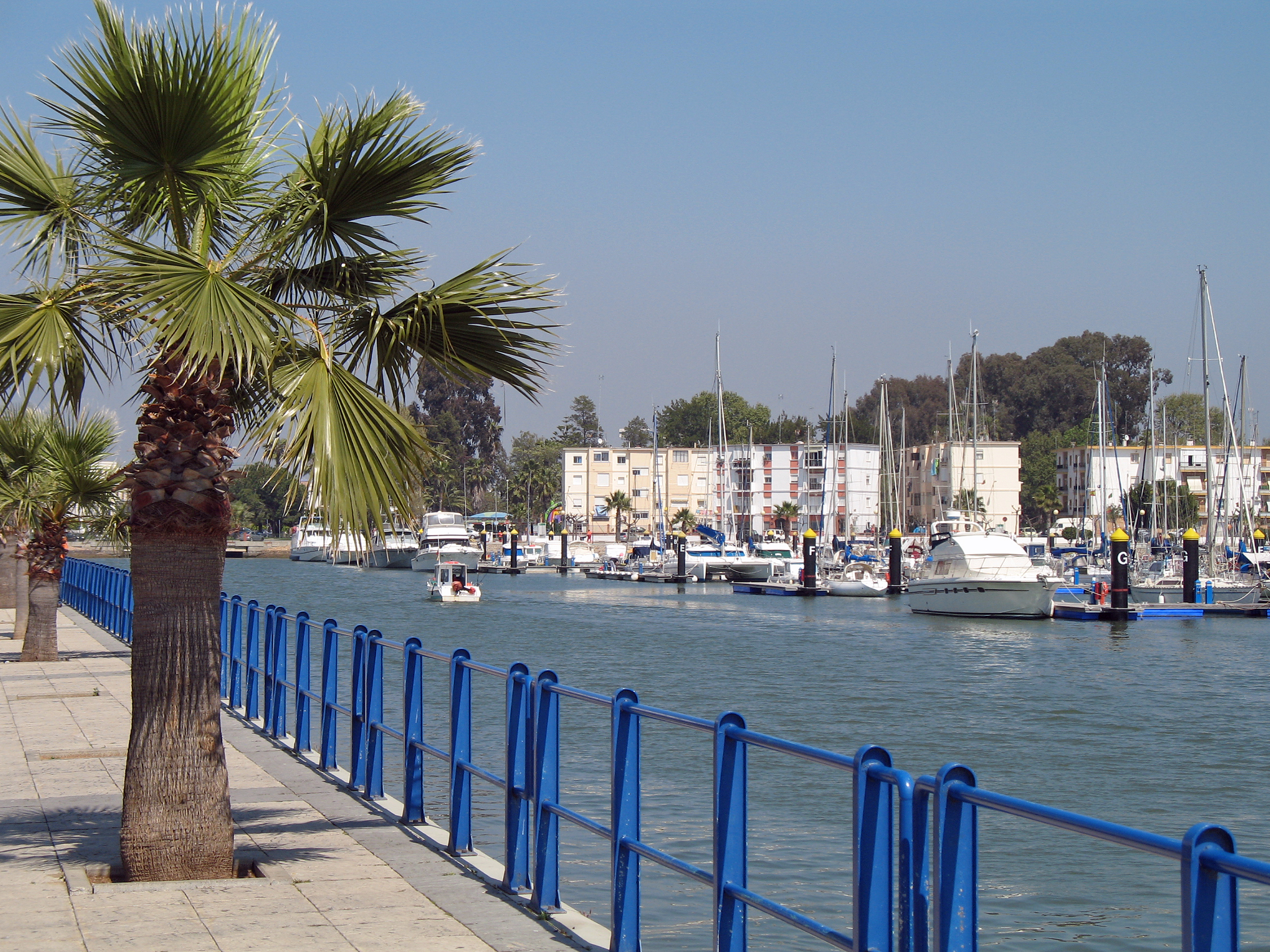
Marina in Ayamonte

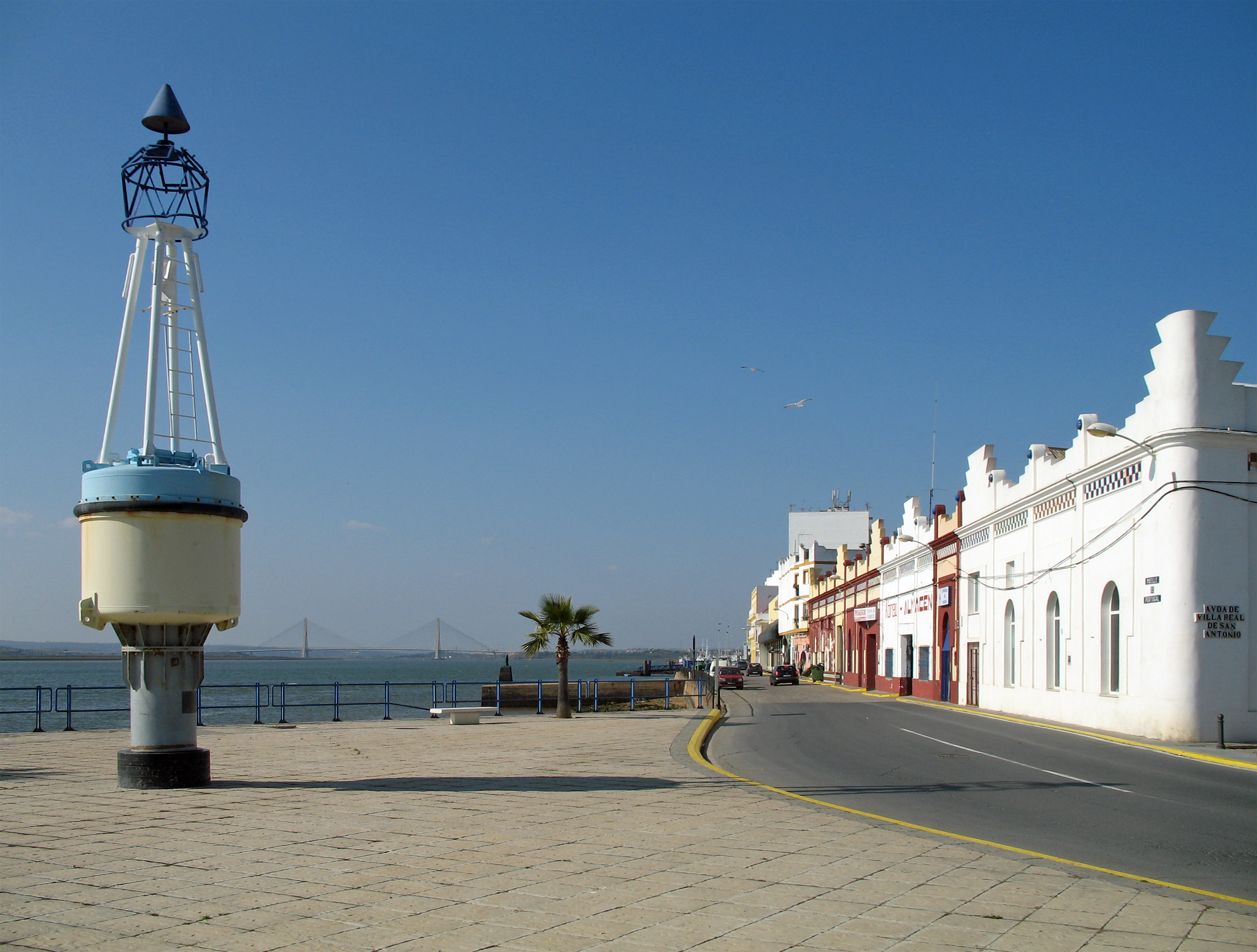
The bank of the Guadiana River

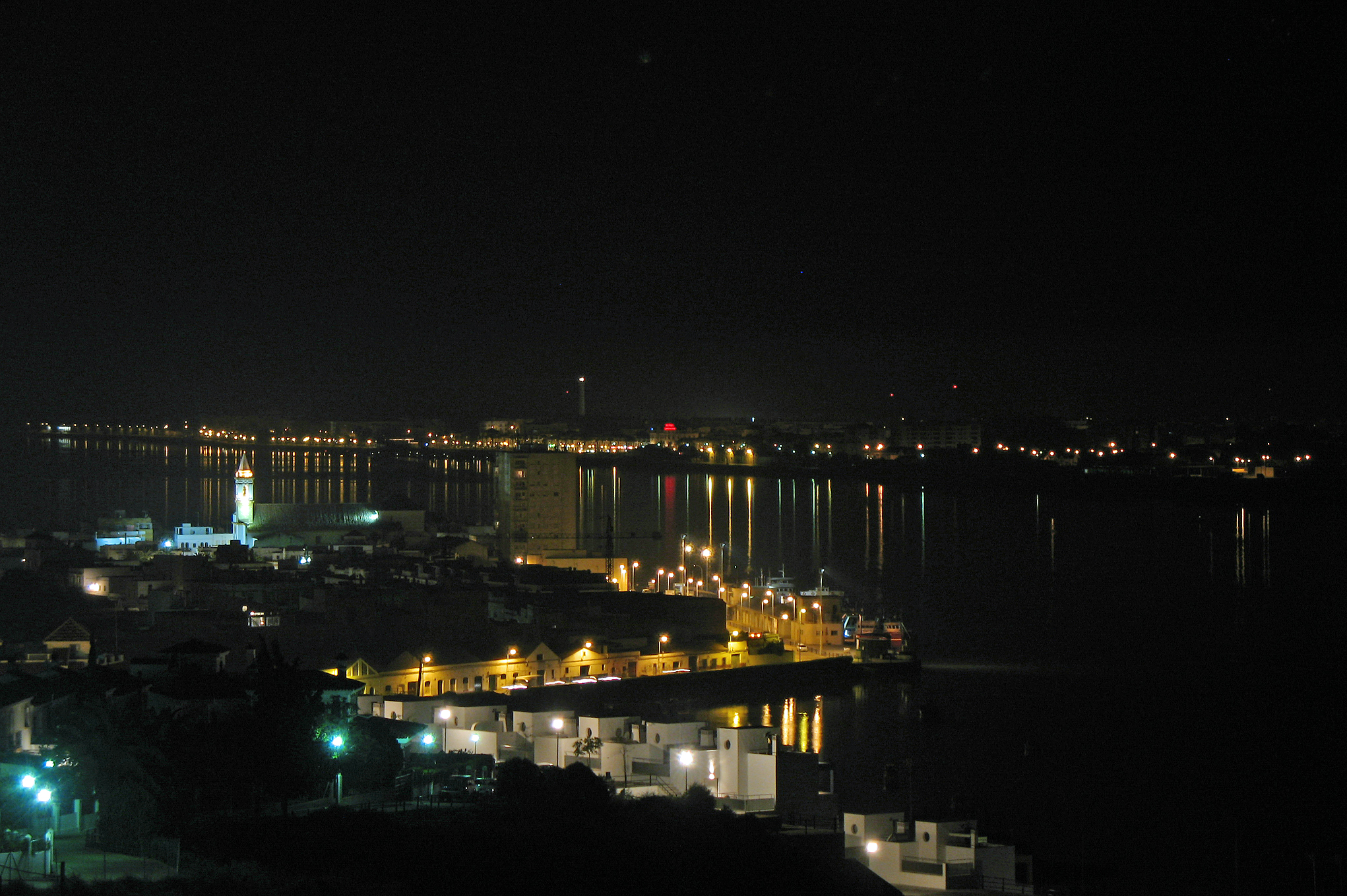
Ayamonte during night

== Climate ==
Ayamonte has a hot summer-mediterranean climate (Köppen: Csa) with mild, somewhat wet winters and dry, hot summers. Autumn is the wettest season.

Climate data for Ayamonte (1991-2020 normals, 1991-present extremes)
Month	Jan	Feb	Mar	Apr	May	Jun	Jul	Aug	Sep	Oct	Nov	Dec	Year
Record high °C (°F)	24.6 (76.3)	26.0 (78.8)	29.7 (85.5)	34.9 (94.8)	37.5 (99.5)	39.4 (102.9)	42.7 (108.9)	42.2 (108.0)	36.5 (97.7)	34.7 (94.5)	27.6 (81.7)	23.8 (74.8)	42.7 (108.9)
Mean daily maximum °C (°F)	16.5 (61.7)	17.3 (63.1)	19.4 (66.9)	21.4 (70.5)	24.7 (76.5)	27.8 (82.0)	30.3 (86.5)	30.8 (87.4)	27.8 (82.0)	24.6 (76.3)	19.9 (67.8)	17.1 (62.8)	23.1 (73.6)
Daily mean °C (°F)	11.8 (53.2)	12.5 (54.5)	14.5 (58.1)	16.7 (62.1)	19.6 (67.3)	22.7 (72.9)	24.8 (76.6)	25.3 (77.5)	22.9 (73.2)	19.9 (67.8)	15.4 (59.7)	12.6 (54.7)	18.2 (64.8)
Mean daily minimum °C (°F)	7.2 (45.0)	7.7 (45.9)	9.5 (49.1)	11.9 (53.4)	14.4 (57.9)	17.5 (63.5)	19.2 (66.6)	19.8 (67.6)	17.9 (64.2)	15.2 (59.4)	10.8 (51.4)	8.0 (46.4)	13.3 (55.9)
Record low °C (°F)	−0.4 (31.3)	0.0 (32.0)	2.8 (37.0)	6.3 (43.3)	7.5 (45.5)	11.7 (53.1)	15.0 (59.0)	15.2 (59.4)	13.6 (56.5)	7.2 (45.0)	2.4 (36.3)	1.1 (34.0)	−0.4 (31.3)
Average precipitation mm (inches)	37.0 (1.46)	48.8 (1.92)	61.9 (2.44)	47.6 (1.87)	27.4 (1.08)	3.7 (0.15)	0.2 (0.01)	3.9 (0.15)	14.6 (0.57)	60.7 (2.39)	94.1 (3.70)	46.9 (1.85)	446.8 (17.59)
Average precipitation days (≥ 1 mm)	4.7	5.4	6.4	6.3	4.1	0.9	0.1	0.3	1.9	6.0	7.6	4.8	48.5
Source: Agencia Estatal de Meteorologia

== Demographics ==
Historical population
Year	Pop.	±%
1999	16,980	—
2000	16,939	−0.2%
2001	17,084	+0.9%
2002	17,292	+1.2%
2003	17,402	+0.6%
2004	17,623	+1.3%
2005	18,001	+2.1%
2006	18,636	+3.5%
2007	19,380	+4.0%
2008	19,738	+1.8%
2009	20,334	+3.0%
2010	20,597	+1.3%
2011	20,763	+0.8%
2012	20,968	+1.0%
2013	20,406	−2.7%
2014	19,690	−3.5%
2015	20,357	+3.4%
2016	20,629	+1.3%
2017	20,714	+0.4%
2018	20,883	+0.8%
2019	20,946	+0.3%
2020	21,104	+0.8%
2021	21,510	+1.9%
2022	21,725	+1.0%
2023	21,645	−0.4%
2024	20,597	−4.8%

== People ==
- Antonio León Ortega (1907–1991), Sculptor. He had his professional education in Madrid and he created a personal style in the Andalusian imagery of the 20th century.
- María Isabel, singer.

== See also ==
- List of municipalities in Huelva
