= La Torre-La Janera megalithic site =

Archaeological site in Spain

Barpa Langass
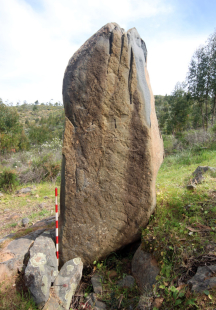
- A standing stone of the site
- Interactive map of Barpa Langass
- 37°19′59.16″N 7°24′20.88″W
- Type: Archaeological site
- Location: Andalusia, Spain

History
- Built: c. 4000 BC
- Abandoned: c. 3500 BC

Site notes
- Discovered: 2018

The La Torre-La Janera megalithic site is located in the municipalities of Ayamonte and Villablanca in the province of Huelva, Andalusia. It was discovered in 2018 when a farmer intended to prepare the land to cultivate avocados and in view of the archaeological potential of the site the local council demanded a survey to be made. It is considered to be one of the largest megalithic site in Europe with over 500 standing stones.

== Location ==
The site is in the municipalities of Ayamonte and Villablanca at about 2.5 km to the west of the Guadiana River and some fifteen km from the Atlantic Ocean in the south. It was built though near the coastline as some 6,000 to 4,000 years ago, the sea level was two meters higher. The megaliths are in about 90 hectares that are part of a 600 hectare large rural estate.

== Discovery ==
The megalithic site was discovered in 2018 as in view of the archaeological potential of the site, the local council decided to execute a survey through which menhirs, dolmens, burial grounds were unearthed. Following the Regional Government of Andalusia divided the area into four divisions mostly reserved for archeological investigations, and agricultural use is only permitted on about 220 hectares of the site. It has at least 6 surrounding terraces and a quarries for greywacke and conglomerate

== Description ==
La Torre - La Jarena is described as the largest megalithic site in Europe, with hundreds of standing stones, several dolmens and geometric alignments.

=== Dolmens ===
There are several dolmens on the site, who stand out for the small size of their chambers. Some stand alone, others in groups and they were up to half a meter high. Forming circles or ovals, the several dolmens diameters spanned from six to seventeen meters and forty-one coffins hewn in stone have also been found within them.

=== Standing stones ===
So far, 526 standing stones were revealed during the survey, either still standing or lying on the surface. Most of the ones in an alignment of a geometric form are lying on the ground.

=== Geometric alignments ===
There are two alignments: one is U-shaped or horseshoe-shaped, and the other is H-shaped. The third one is an elliptic one. They seem to have been created and are assembled on a hilly surface. The elliptic one is within an area of almost 2 hectares and 200 meters long in its long diameter. It has at least six surrounding terraces and a quarry for Greywacke. The H spans 100 meters length, 80 meters width and is composed by three interconnected walls which include six menhirs.

== History ==
It is assumed that the first megaliths were erected in the 5th or 4th Millennia BC while most constructions are thought to have been erected between 3750 and 3500 BC. Eucalyptus have been planted in the region, and the area has also been affected by the construction of a wind farm in 2008.
