= Villablanca =

Municipality of Spain

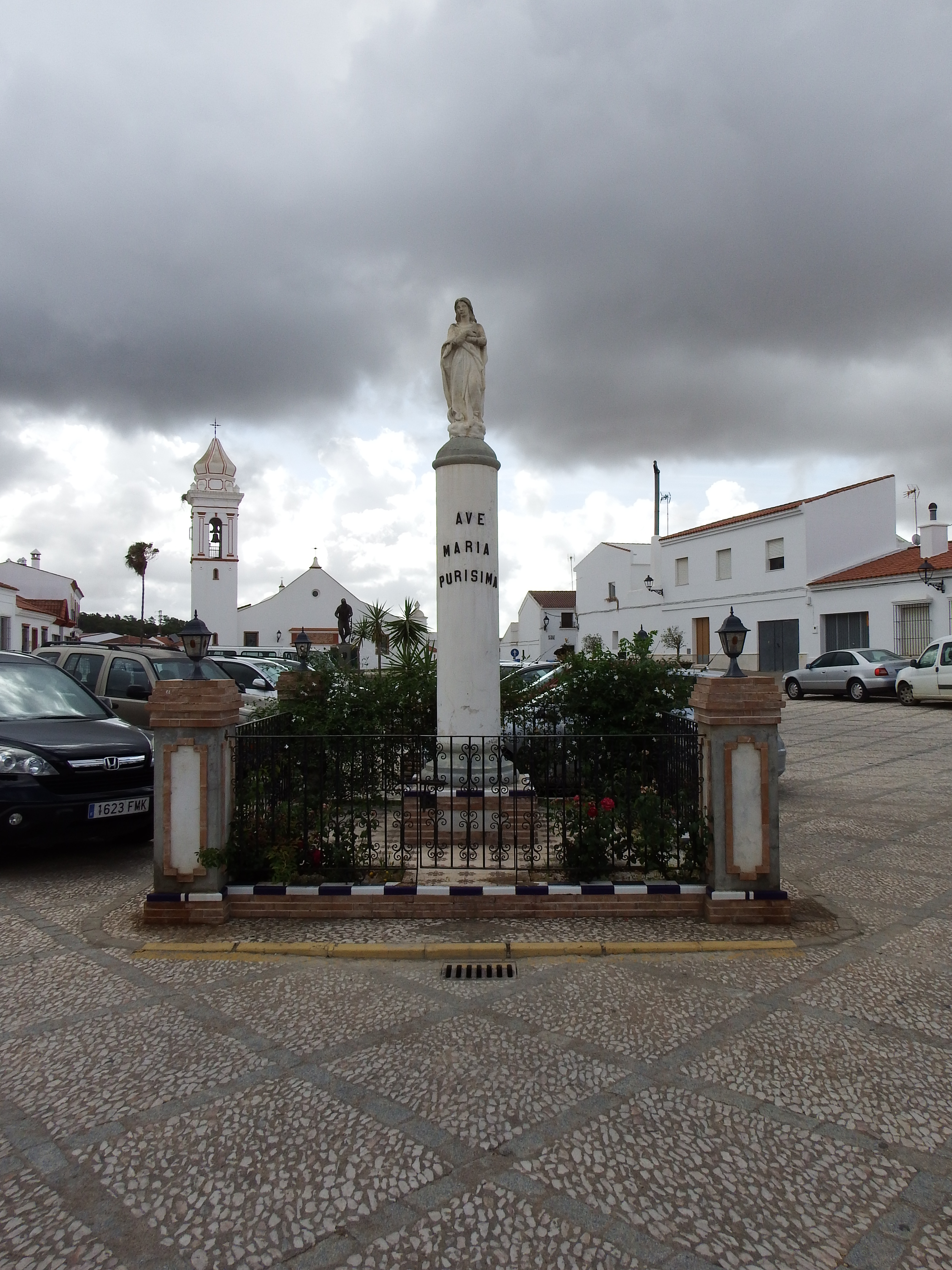

- Flag Coat of arms

- Location of Villablanca in Spain
- Coordinates: 37°18′N 7°20′W
- Country: Spain
- Autonomous community: Andalusia
- Province: Huelva

Area
  - Total: 98 km^{2} (38 sq mi)
- Elevation: 100 m (330 ft)

Population (2025-01-01)
  - Total: 2,939
  - Density: 30/km^{2} (78/sq mi)
- Time zone: UTC+1 (CET)
  - Summer (DST): UTC+2 (CEST)

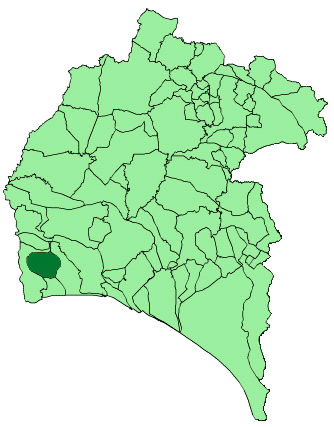
Map of Villablanca, Huelva

Villablanca is a town and municipality located in the province of Huelva, Spain. According to the 2011 census, the municipality had a population of 2916 inhabitants. The Constitution Square was designed in the 16th century and is located in the towns centre.

== History ==
While the name Villalba can be traced to the 16th century, the area's first inhabitants have migrated from Africa and became a sedentary people in the Neolithic era.

Parts of the megalithic site La Torre-La Janera are located within the municipality.

== Religion ==
At the Constitution Square is the San Sebastián Church, built in the 17th century by the Marquis de Ayamonte.

== See also ==
- List of municipalities in Huelva
