= Andévalo =

Coordinates: 37°44′N 07°15′W

El Andévalo
- Comarca
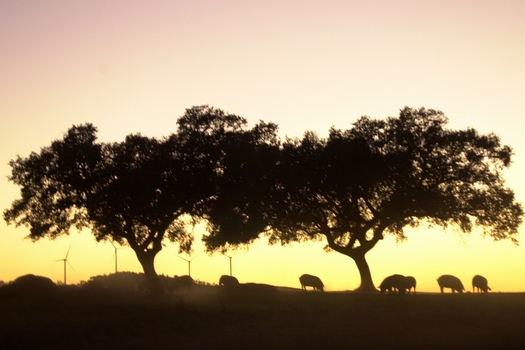
- Twilight landscape with Iberian pigs under oak trees in Tharsis.

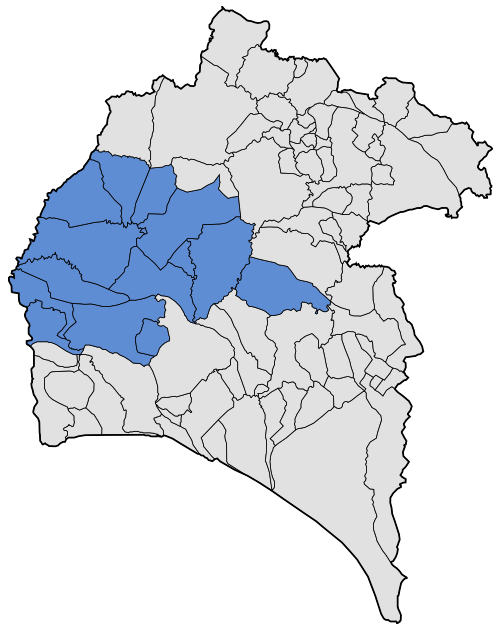
- Location of El Andévalo in the province of Huelva
- Country: Spain
- Region: Andalusia

Area
  - Total: 2,553 km^{2} (986 sq mi)
- Elevation: 260 m (850 ft)

Population (2024) (Note: Census at 1 January 2024: National Statistics Institute (Spain))
  - Total: 38,640
  - Density: 15.14/km^{2} (39.20/sq mi)

El Andévalo or El Campo de Andévalo is one of the six comarcas in Huelva Province, Andalusia, southern Spain. It is located between the Sierra de Huelva, Costa Occidental, Cuenca Minera, Huelva and Condado de Huelva comarcas and the border of Portugal.

The present-day comarca was established in 2003.

== Municipal terms ==
Arms	Municipality	Area (km^{2})	Population (2024) (Note: Census at 1 January 2024: National Statistics Institute (Spain))	Density (/km^{2})
	Alosno	191.07	3 982	20.84
	Cabezas Rubias	109.0	710	6.51
	Calañas	237.83	2,759	11.60
	El Almendro	170.61	858	5.03
	El Cerro de Andévalo	286.12	2,260	7.90
	El Granado	97.55	493	5.05
	La Zarza-Perrunal	44.71	1,189	26.59
	Paymogo	214.0	1 143	5.34
	Puebla de Guzmán	336.30	3,095	9.20
	San Bartolomé de la Torre	56.61	4,036	71.29
	San Silvestre de Guzmán	49.0	644	13.14
	Sanlúcar de Guadiana	96.50	416	4.31
	Santa Bárbara de Casa	146.59	1,128	7.69
	Tharsis	-	1,854	-
	Valverde del Camino	218.70	12,611	57.66
	Villanueva de las Cruces	34.39	380	11.05
	Villanueva de los Castillejos	263.98	2,936	11.12
	Total	2,552.96	38,640	15.14

== See also ==
- Comarcas of Andalusia
