= La Barca mill =

Tide mill ruins in Spain

- Molino de la Barca
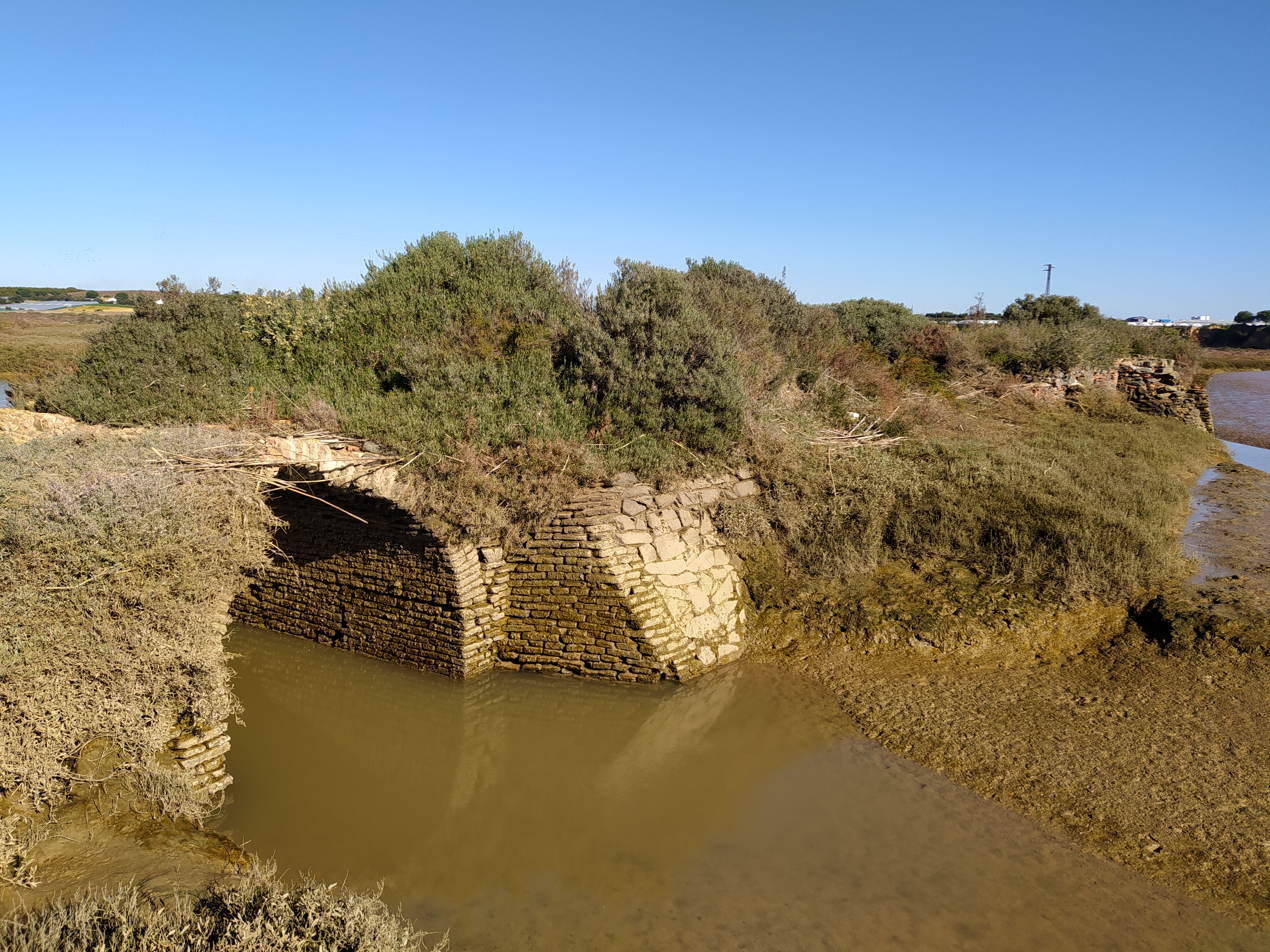

Tide mill
- Current status: Ruins
- Location: Lepe, Spain
- Coordinates: 37°17′13″N 7°10′32″W

The La Barca mill (in Spanish: Molino de la Barca) is a tide mill located in Lepe, in the province of Huelva, in Spain.

== History ==
The first known tide mill was built in Ireland in the 7th century. This type of infrastructure proliferated along the Atlantic coast of Europe during the Middle Ages and especially after the great discoveries, when maritime routes increased the need for flour. They were initially owned by religious orders or noblemen, who leased them to private individuals, and were not privatized until the 18th to 19th centuries. These were environmentally sustainable infrastructures integrated into the natural environment, which, however, fell into disuse due to their lack of profitability and productivity in the 19th century after the Industrial Revolution.

On the coast of Huelva, there is evidence of tide mills in Gibraleón, Moguer and Ayamonte, dating back to the 15th to 16th centuries.

== Description ==
The location of this mill is marked by a large, circular stone, which, although partially covered, can be seen from the La Barca bridge over the Piedras river. Like other mills in the area, it is situated on an elevation of land above the marsh, raised over at least five large troughs, a large millstone, and an arch finished with brick on a wall. The arch, which is located outside the building, is believed to have been part of the gate for filling the boiler. The exact technology used by this tidal mill is unknown, but based on the remains found, it is known that the milling capacity was five millstones.

== Protection and state of conservation ==
The La Barca mill was registered in the General Catalog of Andalusian Historical Heritage, as a general cataloging real estate asset, on June 23, 2010.

== See also ==
- Higuera mill
- Piedras river
- Valletaray mill
