= Santa María La Bella Convent =

Former Franciscan convent in Lepe, Huelva, Spain

- Franciscan Convent of El Terrón
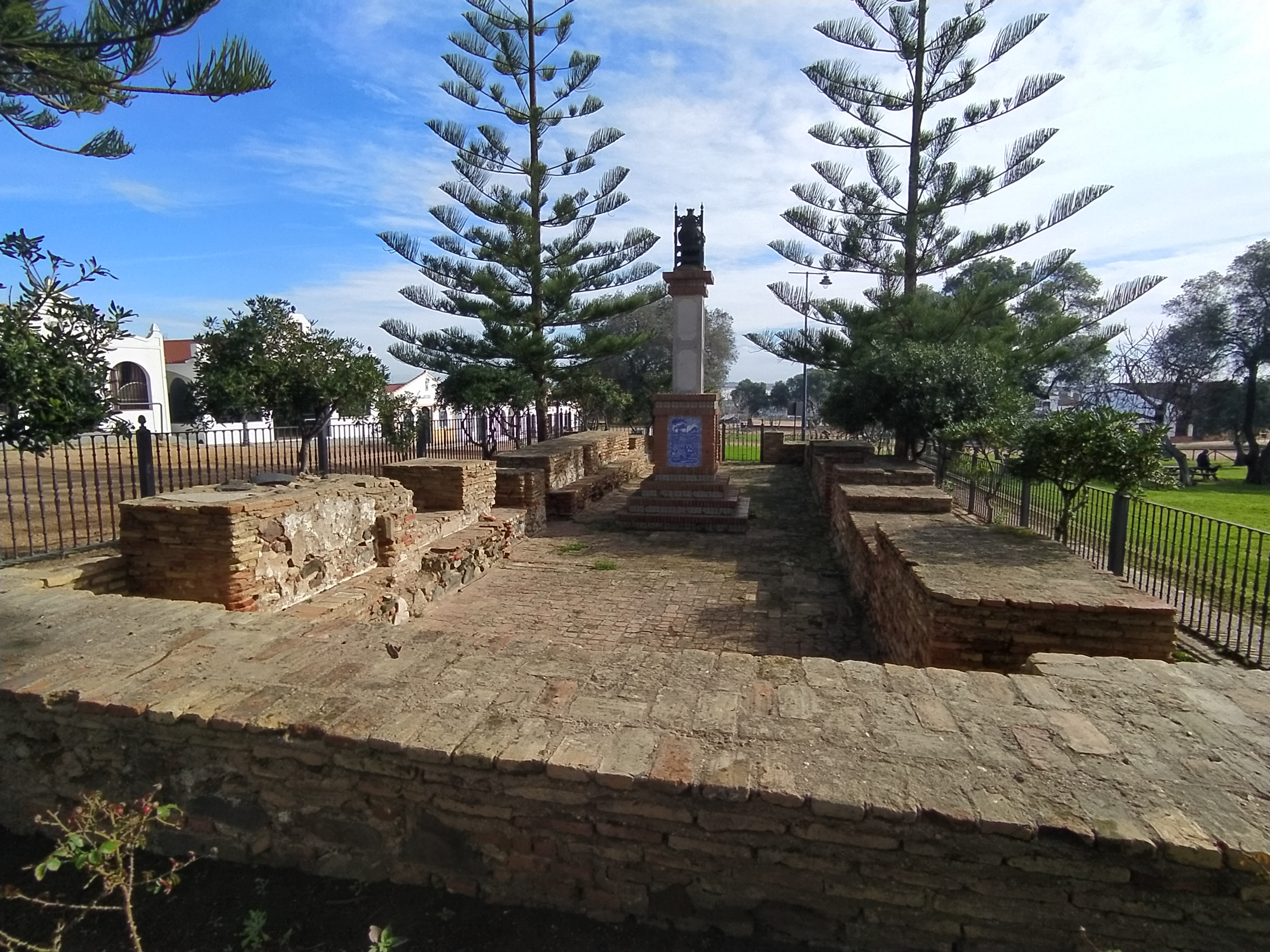
- Ruins of the Santa María La Bella Convent with the 1985 commemorative monument in the center.
- Interactive map of Santa María La Bella Convent

Santa María La Bella Convent was a Franciscan convent located in the municipality of Lepe, Province of Huelva, Spain. It was built between the port of El Terrón and the Torre del Catalán, near the former mouth of the Piedras River.

Constructed in 1513 to replace an earlier 15th-century convent nearby, it housed friars from its founding until its confiscation in 1835. After this, it was abandoned and fell into ruins, around which an annual Romería is held in honor of the Lady of the Bella, a Marian devotion image once kept in the convent.

== Description ==
=== Building ===
No paintings or engravings of the building's structure survive, but a 1813 inventory details assets confiscated on December 19, 1812, and temporarily held by the municipal government. The building centered around a courtyard with a cistern and included seventeen naos, a refectory, kitchen, corral, and pantry. The church had a barrel vault, three altarpieces, lateral niches, and a high choir. Marble, brick, and wood were used as construction materials, though their distribution is unknown.

=== Movable assets ===
The main altarpiece was dedicated to Our Lady of the Bella and crafted in 1689 by Juan de Oviedo. It was adorned with two Solomonic columns, reused by sculptor Francisco Domínguez Rodríguez in 1958–1961 for the current altarpiece of the Virgin's image in the Church of Santo Domingo de Guzmán. The camarín, in Rococo style, was restored by Luis Sánchez Jiménez in 1976.

The lateral niches housed images of Saint Francis of Assisi and Saint Didacus of Alcalá. The latter was kept in the Church of Santo Domingo de Guzmán but was moved to the Hermitage of La Bella in 2016 due to restoration work.

The high choir contained wooden choir stalls, a lectern for chant books, and an organ.

The convent housed a crown of Henry VII of England, donated by Juan de Lepe in the 16th century and later held by the Brotherhood of Our Lady of the Bella.

== History ==
=== Background: San Francisco del Monte Convent ===
Coat of arms of the Franciscan Order of Friars Minor.

The crises faced by the Franciscan Order in the 14th century (Black Death, Western Schism, Hundred Years' War) fostered the Observant reform. This led to increased Franciscan convent establishments in the 15th century in the Guadalquivir Valley and Huelva coast, such as the Monastery of La Rábida.

The Franciscan presence in the Lordship of Lepe began with the founding of a convent around 1430–1431 by Francisco de Luján. Its walls were still visible around 1776–1779. The convent's location in this town reflected its economic prosperity, as Lepe provided two-thirds of the Marquessate of Ayamonte's seigneurial income by the late 15th century. Additionally, in 1464, Lepe had Andalusia's second-largest Jewish aljama, contributing 1,500 maravedís to the king, compared to 2,500 from Seville or 1,200 from Córdoba.

Named San Francisco del Monte or San Francisco el Viejo, the convent was abandoned in 1488 when its friars were expelled for unknown reasons, possibly due to disputes with locals, as suggested by historian Antolín Abad Pérez.

=== Santa María La Bella Convent ===
==== Foundation and dedication ====
The new convent was founded in 1513 by Francisco de Zúñiga y Pérez de Guzmán and his wife Leonor de Manrique, Marquisate of Ayamonte, possibly as penance for the earlier expulsion of friars. Its construction aligned with the House of Ayamonte's building efforts in Lepe and Ayamonte during the early 16th century. The House received the title of county in 1475 from Queen Isabella I of Castile and was elevated to marquessate in 1521 by King Charles I. They were patrons of the Franciscan Order, with burials in the Casa Grande de San Francisco in Seville, and extended patronage to the Franciscan Province of Baetica in 1592.

The convent was built near the Piedras River's mouth, close to the Torre del Catalán and the port of El Terrón, to evangelize and spiritually assist local fishermen. Before the Our Lady of Mount Carmel became the patroness of fishermen and sailors in the late 18th century and of the Spanish Navy in 1901, Huelva's coast had various popular Marian devotions: Angustias (Ayamonte), Bella (Lepe), Cinta (Huelva), Milagros (Palos de la Frontera).

==== Pilgrimages to the convent ====
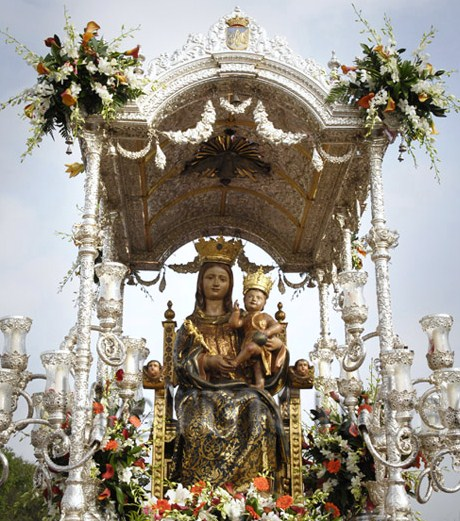
Image of Our Lady of the Bella.

The convent's peak prosperity occurred in the 17th century, coinciding with the town's economic growth, followed by a gradual decline. Franciscan convents, prohibited from owning land, relied on alms, with friars often serving as almoners. Numerous bequests and donations supported the convent between the 17th and 19th centuries due to devotion to Our Lady of the Bella, including a notable donation by Lepe metallurgist Álvaro Alonso Barba. Friars from the convent served as Lenten preachers in Puebla de Guzmán, earning 500–600 reales from the town's council. In the 18th century, it was noted as a pilgrimage site where many people continually come on romería with over 4,000 attendees at the Feast of the Bella (August 15) in 1802. For comparison, Lepe's population was 2,124 in 1787 per the Floridablanca Census and 2,800 around 1826–1829 per Sebastián de Miñano's Geographical-Statistical Dictionary.

==== Resident religious ====
In 1622, visitator Rodrigo Caro described the convent as very religious, housing twelve priests who lived well due to donations driven by devotion to Our Lady of the Bella. In the late 17th century, it hosted the Apostolic College of Missions for the Franciscan Province of Baetica, later moved to Arcos de la Frontera (Cádiz).

In 1750, it housed ten religious, per the Catastro de Ensenada. Miñano's Dictionary notes three convents in Lepe: one Dominican (Santa María de Gracia), one Franciscan Observant (Santa María La Bella), and one Dominican nuns' (Convent of La Piedad). In 1768, a Provincial Chapter decree aimed to reduce Franciscan religious in Baetica from 1,151 to 950. After the Spanish War of Independence, the number of Franciscan religious in Huelva's convents dropped from 156 in 1808 to 44 in 1820. These events impacted the Santa María La Bella Convent.

=== Confiscation and abandonment ===
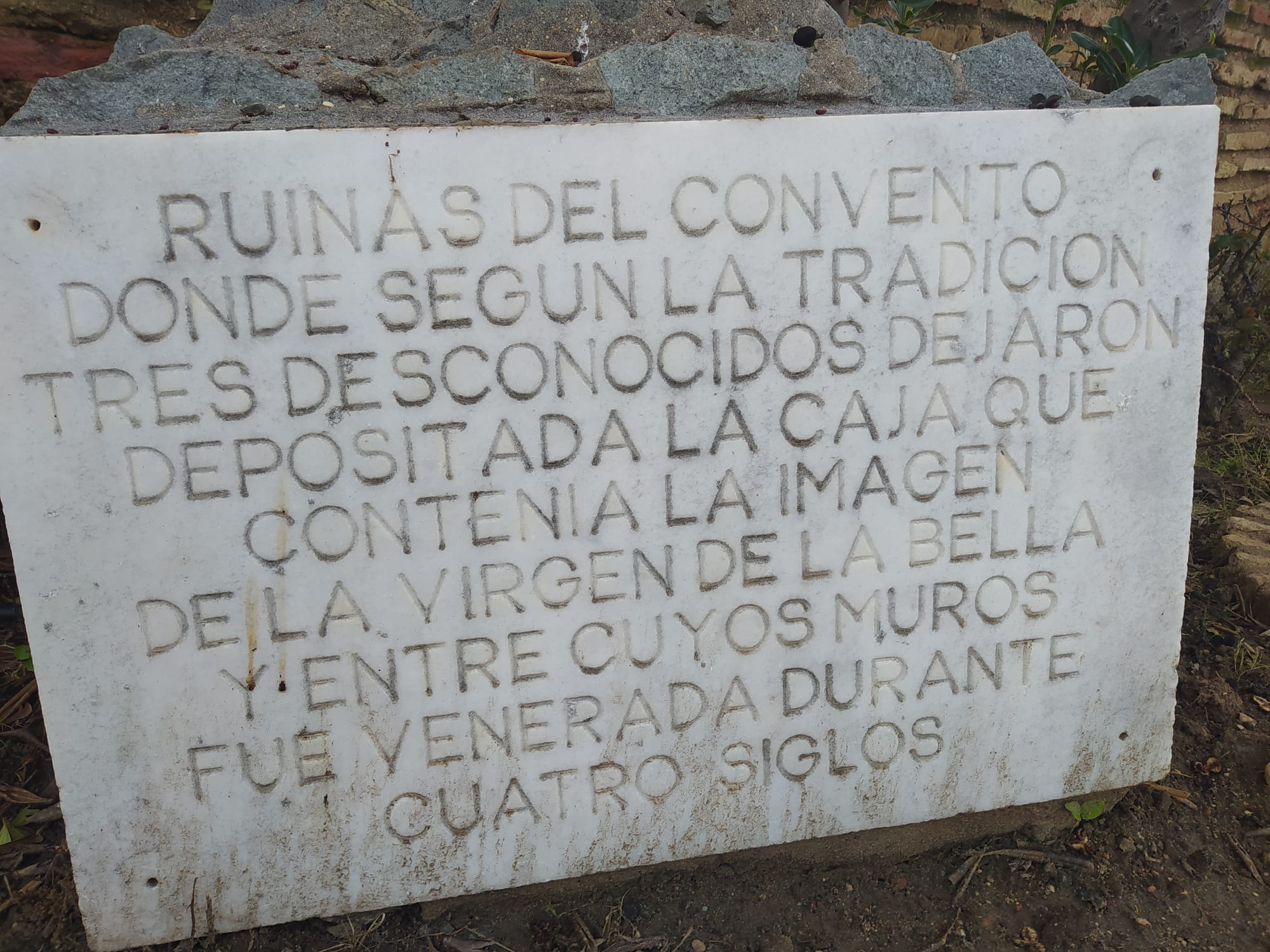
Commemorative plaque by the convent ruins.

On November 18, 1836, the convent was declared for sale under the law of July 25, 1835 by Juan Álvarez Mendizábal. By 1847, Pascual Madoz's dictionary listed it as sold, alongside the disappearance of the Convent of Santa María de Gracia. It was purchased by José Arroyo Bermúdez on April 18, 1842, for 8,000 reales and later abandoned, with its marble used in the buyer's heirs' home and its bricks and wood in Lepe's La Pendola neighborhood.

After confiscation, the image of Our Lady of the Bella was moved to Lepe, and the town received royal permission to hold an annual fair on August 14–16, still celebrated today. In 1956, the town council unanimously named the Virgin Honorary and Perpetual Mayor. The COVID-19 pandemic canceled the 2020 festivities, though religious services continued, except for the Virgin's transfer from her camarín to the high altar.

=== New pilgrimages around the ruins ===
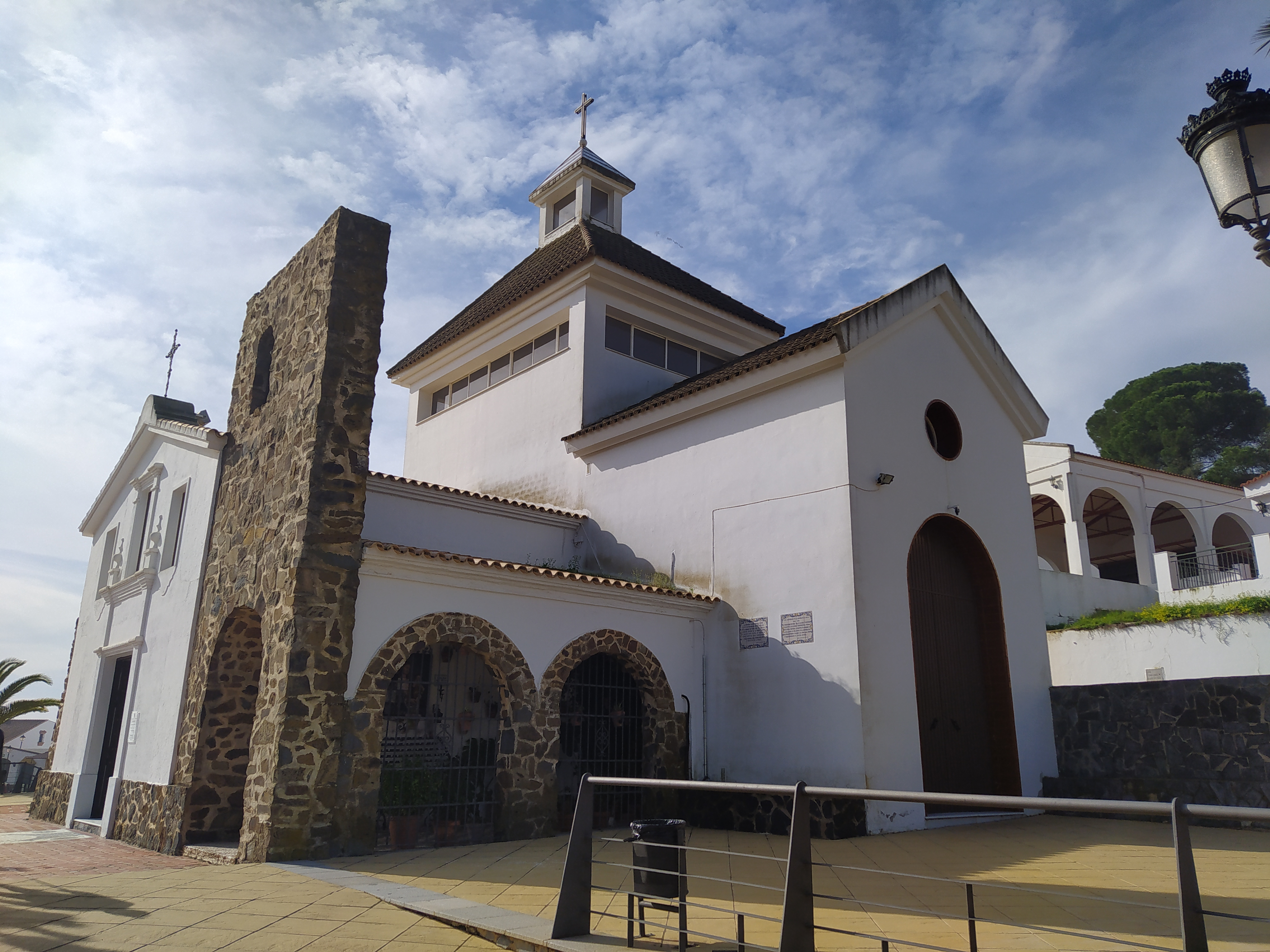
Hermitage of La Bella, built near the ruins of the Santa María La Bella Convent.

In May 1966, a group from Catholic Action organized a gathering by the Franciscan convent ruins, led by Lepe's parish priest Manuel Gómez Orta. The event's popularity turned it into Lepe's first 20th-century romería. This led to the construction of the Hermitage of La Bella, inaugurated in 1968 by the Bishop of Huelva José María García Lahiguera, near the ruins. A commemorative monument, created by Lepe sculptor Francisco Rodríguez Aguaded, was inaugurated among the ruins on May 19, 1985.

In 2016, the 50th anniversary of the modern Romería de la Bella was celebrated, held annually on the second Sunday of May. The 2020 romería was canceled due to the COVID-19 pandemic, with alternative events in Lepe and increased surveillance around the ruins to prevent gatherings.

== See also ==
- Franciscans
- Convent

== Bibliography ==
- Abad, Antolín (1996). "En las tierras del Algarve andaluz y tras las huellas de Ntra. Sra. la Bella de Lepe". Historia de Lepe. Una proyección hacia el futuro [History of Lepe. A projection into the future.] (in Spanish). Ayuntamiento de Lepe. ISBN 84-606-2258-4.
- Amador, Rodrigo (1891). Huelva (in Spanish). Barcelona, Establecimiento Tipográfico "Artes y Letras".
- Barnadas, Josep (1986). Álvaro Alonso Barba (1569-1662). Investigaciones sobre su vida y obra [Álvaro Alonso Barba (1569-1662). Investigations into his life and work] (in Spanish). Biblioteca Minera Boliviana.
- Calderón, María del Carmen (1996). "Lepe en la Visitatio Rerum de la Archidiócesis Hispalense (1622-1880)". Historia de Lepe. Una proyección hasta el futuro [History of Lepe. A projection into the future] (in Spanish). Ayuntamiento de Lepe. ISBN 84-606-2258-4.
- González, Juan Miguel (1996). "Patrimonio histórico-artístico de Lepe. Bienes muebles e inmuebles" [Historical-artistic heritage of Lepe. Movable and immovable assets]. Historia de Lepe. Una proyección hasta el futuro. (in Spanish). Ayuntamiento de Lepe. ISBN 84-606-2258-4.
- López, Antonio (2004). "Los Conventos de Lepe. Aspectos económicos de su historia" [The Convents of Lepe. Economic aspects of their history]. El Estero (in Spanish) (1).
- Jiménez, Álvaro; Rodríguez, Juan Clemente (1999). "Estudio arqueológico y documental de la Ermita de San Cristóbal de Lepe (Huelva)" [Archaeological and documentary study of the Hermitage of San Cristóbal de Lepe (Huelva)]. Anuario arqueológico de Andalucía (in Spanish). 3, Tomo I. Junta de Andalucía: 394–405. ISBN 84-8266-279-1.
- Martínez, María Elisa (1996). "Los conventos franciscanos observantes en el Archivo Iberoamericano" [Observant Franciscan convents in the Ibero-American Archive]. Cuadernos de Historia Moderna (in Spanish). 17: 151–171.
- Menguiano, Arcadio (1996). "La Virgen de la Bella, devoción mariana de Lepe" [The Virgin of the Bella, Marian devotion of Lepe]. Historia de Lepe. Una proyección hasta el futuro (in Spanish). Lepe: Ayuntamiento de Lepe: 473–506. ISBN 84-606-2258-4.
- Núñez, Francisco (1985). "La vida rural en un lugar del Señorío de Niebla: La Puebla de Guzmán (siglos XVI al XVIII)" [Rural life in a place of the Lordship of Niebla: La Puebla de Guzmán (16th to 18th centuries)]. Diputación Provincial de Huelva (in Spanish). ISBN 84-505-2494-6.
- Núñez, Francisco (1996). "Historia breve de una villa marítima y campesina entre los siglos XVIII y XIX" [Brief history of a maritime and rural town between the 18th and 19th centuries]. Historia de Lepe. Una proyección hasta el futuro (in Spanish). Ayuntamiento de Lepe: 571–590. ISBN 84-606-2258-4.
- Otero, Juana (2009). "La herencia monumental de Lepe. El Convento de La Piedad" [The monumental heritage of Lepe. The Convent of La Piedad]. El Lugar Heredado (in Spanish). Huelva: University of Huelva: 119–144. ISBN 978-84-92679-44-7.
