= Valletaray mill =

Ruins of a tide mill in Spain

- Molino de Valletaray
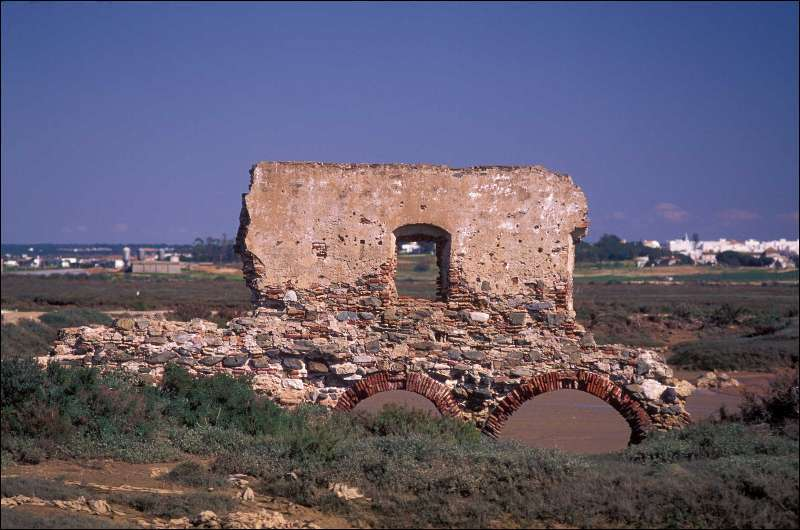

Tide mill
- Current status: Ruins
- Location: Lepe, Spain
- Coordinates: 37°15′41″N 7°10′18″W

The Valletaray mill (in Spanish: Molino de Valletaray) is a tide mill located in Lepe, in the province of Huelva, in Spain.

== History ==
The first known tide mill was built in Ireland in the 7th century. This type of infrastructure proliferated along the Atlantic coast of Europe during the Middle Ages and especially after the great discoveries, when maritime routes increased the need for flour. They were initially owned by religious orders or noblemen, who leased them to private individuals, and were not privatized until the 18th to 19th centuries. These were environmentally sustainable infrastructures integrated into the natural environment, which, however, fell into disuse due to their lack of profitability and productivity in the 19th century after the Industrial Revolution.

On the coast of Huelva, there is evidence of tide mills in Gibraleón, Moguer and Ayamonte, dating back to the 15th to 16th centuries.

== Description ==
Today, all that is left of the mill is a facade supported by a series of brick-lined troughs, and it is believed to have been part of the original mill's grinding area. This structure's milling capacity was of four millstones, and while the exact method behind its operation remains uncertain, the main hypothesis suggests that it employed a channel wheel system.

== Protection and state of conservation ==
The Valletaray mill was registered in the General Catalog of Andalusian Historical Heritage, as a general cataloging real estate asset, on June 23, 2010.

== See also ==
- Piedras River
- La Barca mill
- Higuera mill
