= Piedras River, Spain =

River in Huelva, Spain

Piedras River
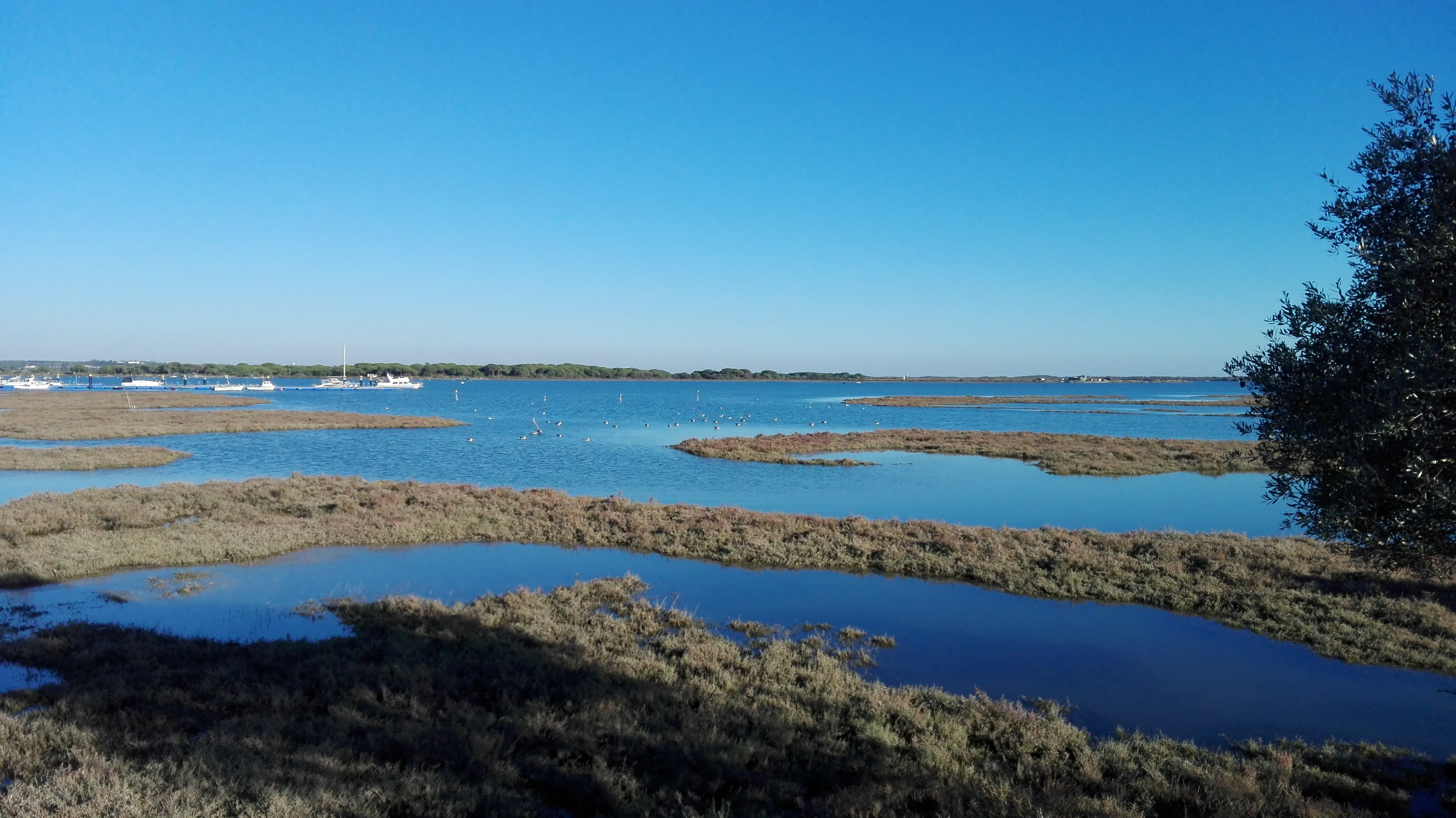
- Interactive map of Piedras River
- Location: Almendro Mountain
- Group: Tinto, Odiel and Piedras
- Coordinates: 37.245853°N 7.164331°W
- Part of: Almendro Mountain
- Basin countries: Spain
- Max. length: 40 kilometres (25 mi)
- Surface area: 549.5 square kilometres (212.2 sq mi)

The Piedras River is a coastal river in southwestern Spain, whose course is located entirely in the province of Huelva. It rises in the municipality of El Almendro, although most of the streams that give rise to it and that come from the Sierra del Almendro, are born in the municipality of Villanueva de los Castillejos. It runs from north to south and flows between the Flecha de Nueva Umbría (Lepe) and Nuevo Portil (Cartaya).

== Hydronymy ==
The Piedras owes its name to the pebbles deposited by the river on its banks and riverbed during floods, despite having a low flow during the rest of the year, which makes the riverbed quite stony.

== Basin ==
Despite its short length and the small irregularities of the relief, the basin of the Piedras River is quite extensive and has the typical shape of a dendritic drainage, as would be the nerves of a palminervian leaf, especially in its upper basin, where almost 20 streams of the mountain range of Almendro meet in two or three main branches that join in turn, in the Piedras Reservoir as can be seen in the satellite image taken from Google maps (map). Of all these streams, the most abundant is the one that originates in the municipality of El Almendro, a little more than 1 km to the northwest of Villanueva de los Castillejos. It is precisely this fact that justifies its greater extension than it would have if it did not have numerous tributaries almost as important as the principal river.

== Management ==
The water resources of the Piedras basin are managed by the Hydrographic Demarcation of the Tinto, Odiel and Piedras (DHTOP), which belongs to the Regional Government of Andalusia. It previously belonged to the hydrographic demarcation of the Cuencas Atlánticas Andaluzas.

== Infrastructure ==
=== Reservoirs ===
It contains several reservoirs along its course:

- Tres Picos Reservoir, is very close to its origin and only serves to regulate the flow rate of water.
- Piedras Reservoir, is the largest and whose channel connects with the supply channel of the industrial area of Huelva, in addition to giving rise to several acequia or canals.
- Los Machos Reservoir, which gives rise to several acequia or canals.

=== Bridges ===
It is crossed in its course under several bridges, all of them behind the Machos Reservoir:

- Bridge of the A-49 over the Piedras River, located a few meters downstream from the Machos Reservoir.
- Tavirona Bridge, a former railway bridge of the Gibraleón-Ayamonte railroad line that today forms part of the Vía Verde del Litoral.
- La Barca Bridge, which crosses the N-431 over the river and connects the towns of Lepe and Cartaya.
- El Terrón-El Rompido Bridge (foundations), whose work was started but later interrupted with no continuation date.

=== Tidal mills ===
In the course of the Piedras River, several tidal mills have been located throughout history, all of them ebb and flow mills, according to the analysis of the remains that are visible. They were probably in use from the 15th century to the 19th century.

In order from the source of the river to its mouth, the following mills are registered in the General Catalog of Andalusian Historical Heritage:

- La Barca Mill (Lepe)
- Legrete Mill (Cartaya)
- Valletaray Mill (Lepe)
- Higuera Mill (Lepe)

== Mouth of the river ==
After passing between the municipalities of Lepe to the west and Cartaya to the east, its mouth in the Atlantic Ocean is parallel to the coast, which is due to a sand tongue or coastal cord, Flecha del Rompido, which runs along a stretch of coastline about 12 kilometers long. In turn, this spit has been growing to the east due to the constant direction of the coastal drift current, a kind of branch of the Gulf Stream and the swell due to the constant winds coming from the west. This mouth constitutes a curious channel that grows a few dozen meters each year. This channel is navigable by shallow draft boats when the tide rises, as it has little depth. The mouth of the Piedras River was declared a Nature reserve in 1989 as Marismas del río Piedras y flecha-de Nueva Umbria.

The vegetation that can be found in this area ranges from sea hollies, retamas and marran grass, in the bar area, to stone pine (Pinus pinea) in the area of Cabezo of El Terrón, through the almajo or small cordgrass in the marsh area. There is a great variety of birds, including endangered species such as the red-crested pochard and the osprey, as well as the little egret and the sandwich tern. In addition to birds, there are chameleons and Iberian lynx, along with other small mammals.

== See also ==
- Province of Huelva

== Bibliography ==
- López Serrano, Lorenzo (1999). Estudio de la macrofauna bentónica de la desembocadura del río Piedras (Huelva) (PDF) (in Spanish). Madrid: Complutense University.
