= La Zarza-Perrunal =

- Municipality
- Flag Coat of arms

- Location in Spain
- Coordinates: 37°42′50″N 6°51′21″W
- Country: Spain
- Autonomous community: Andalusia
- Province: Huelva
- Comarca: Andévalo

Government
  - Alcalde: Juan Manuel Serrano García

Area
  - Total: 44.71 km^{2} (17.26 sq mi)
- Elevation: 240 m (790 ft)

Population (2020)
  - Total: 1,253
  - Density: 28.03/km^{2} (72.58/sq mi)
- Time zone: UTC+1 (CET)
  - Summer (DST): UTC+2 (CEST)

La Zarza-Perrunal, known until 1991 as Silos de Calañas and Minas de Perrunal, is a municipality located in the Province of Huelva, in the autonomous community of Andalusia, Spain, which includes the localities of La Zarza and Perrunal, since their separation in 2018. Before then, it belonged to the municipality of Calañas. The municipality is part of the Andévalo comarca although it is located at the foot of the Sierra de Aracena.
