= Paco Toronjo =

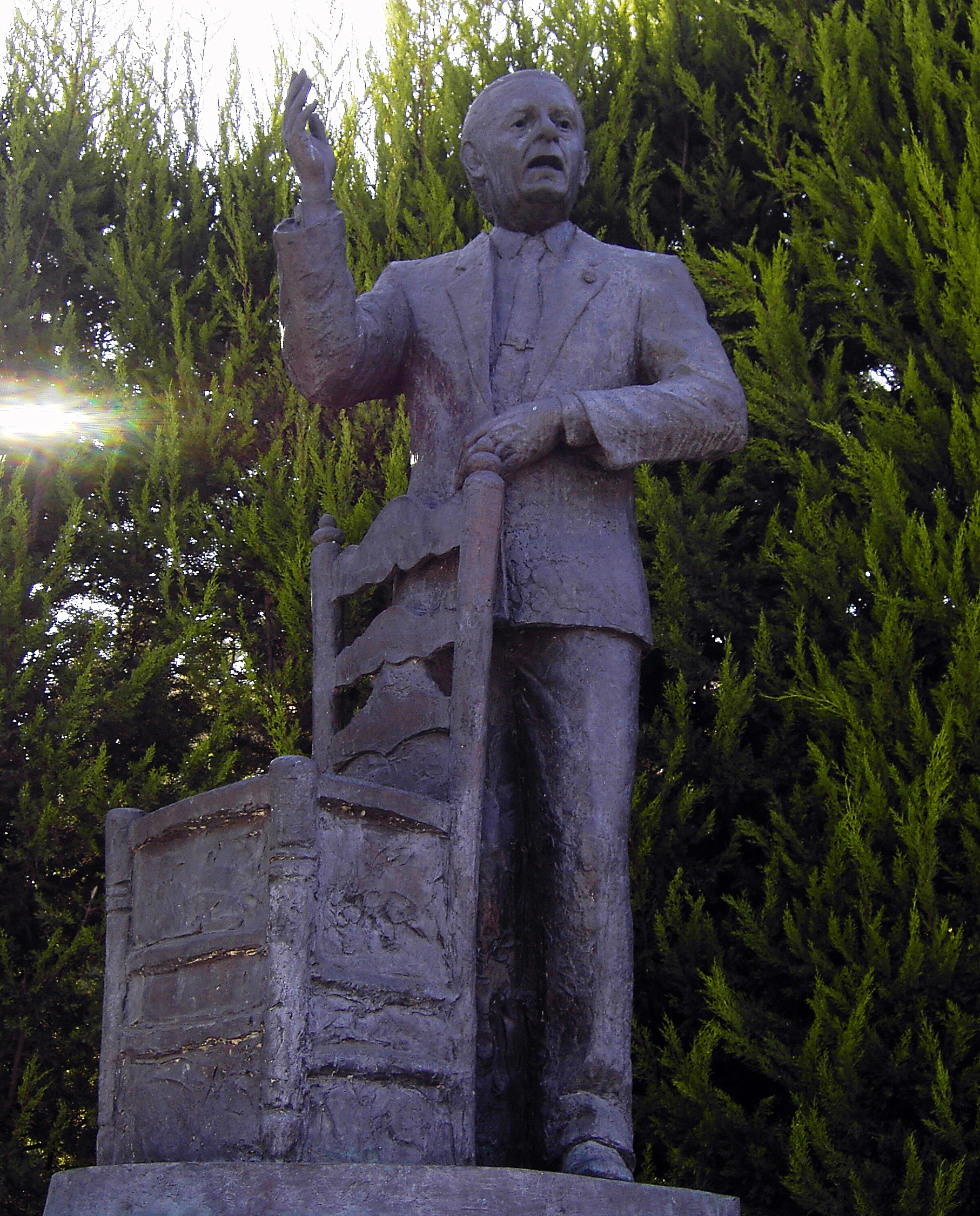
Monument to Paco Toronjo at Huelva.

Francisco Antonio Toronjo Arreciado (Alosno, June 13, 1928 – Huelva, 2 de julio 1998), known as Paco Toronjo, was a Spanish flamenco singer.

He learned to sing local traditional folk music in his home town of Alosno. He left his province when he was 20 years old to become a musician. Moreover, he performed in some tablaos of Madrid city, namely the famous tablao flamenco “Torres Bermejas” (Madrid), where he used to sing during around 30 years. Paco Toronjo musical career starts sang with his brother, Pepe Toronjo, as a duet. They were known as "Los Hermanos Toronjo"(Toronjo Brothers), and were the first to record "Sevillanas".

After his brother's death, he started to develop and record his own style of "fandango", which was very dramatic, with lyrics based on his own life. He sang about the sorrows he had experienced and used the "Siguiriyas" style as a way of increasing the emotional intensity of his work.

This style, along with his rasping singing voice, propelled him to become one of the most respected fandango singers of his generation. In his later years, when he was living in the city of Huelva, he became well known for his bohemian lifestyle.

He appeared in two movies by the Spanish film director Carlos Saura:"Sevillanas" and "Flamenco".

He died in 1998; since then several monuments have been built to remember him in his home province and a complete biography had been released.
