= El Almendro (disambiguation) =

El Almendro can refer to:

- El Almendro, a rural municipality in the Río San Juan department of Nicaragua
- El Almendro, Huelva, Spain
