= Torre del Catalán =

Watchtower in Lepe, Spain

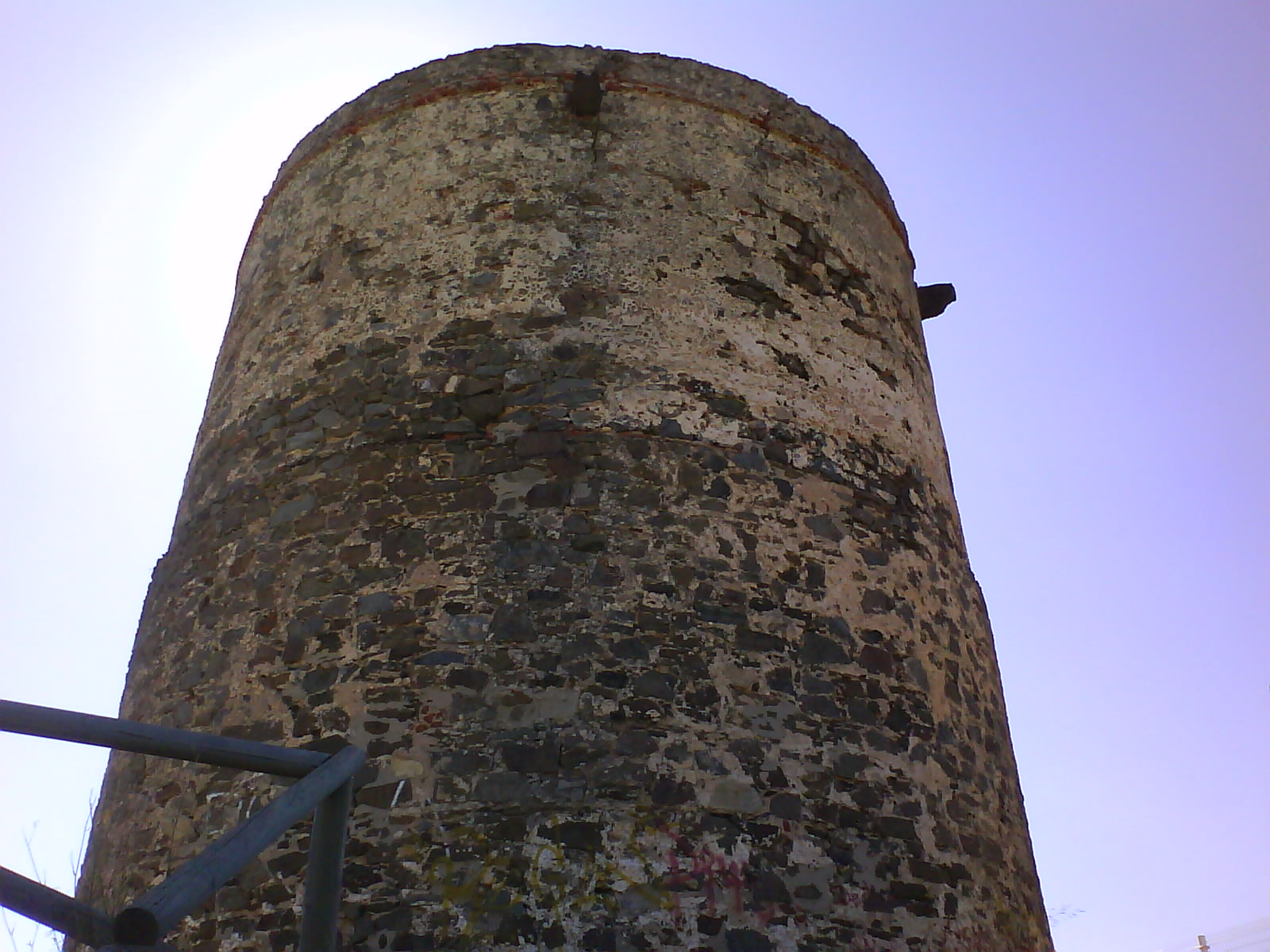
- Torre del Catalán, seen from its base.
- Interactive map of the Torre del Catalán area

General information
- Status: Bien de Interés Cultural
- Type: Military building
- Location: Lookout on a cliff, Andalusia Huelva Lepe, Spain
- Coordinates: 37.216392°N 7.197514°W
- Completed: 1596
- Owner: Lepe city council

Height
- Height: 9.8 m

Technical details
- Material: Stone and brick

The Torre del Catalán (English: El Catalán Tower) is a watchtower located in Lepe, in the province of Huelva (Spain), declared Bien de Interés Cultural.

It is located on top of one of the millenary hillocks that border the coastline, halfway between the beach of La Antilla and the port of El Terrón. It dominates the portion of coastline in front of it and had the mission of guarding it against the incursion of pirates. From its position you can see the natural area Marismas del río Piedras y Flecha del Rompido.

== Description ==
=== Name ===
Although it is currently known as Torre del Catalán, it was officially mentioned as Torre de Sierra Bermeja until well into the 18th century. The toponym Sierra Bermeja is due to the height of the hill on which the tower stands, reddish or bermejo in color. However, there is evidence of the use of El Catalán to refer to this area in the Old Ordinances of the 16th century preserved in the Municipal Archives of Lepe.

=== Function ===
The Watchtower housed one or more lookouts, whose mission was to scan the horizon in search of Barbary pirates attempting to attack the coast. In this situation, they would warn by means of fire signals, during the night, and with smoke or waving white canvases, during the day.

Other watchtowers were built all along the coast of Huelva, which are in different states of preservation: from the disappearance to the restoration, including an inverted tower after the 1755 Lisbon earthquake (Torre de la Higuera). Until the construction of these towers, the coast was protected only by a network of castles located in the inland villages, such as Lepe in this case.

=== Characteristics ===
It is located 37 meters above sea level, 2.4 kilometers from Port of El Terrón and 1.22 kilometers from the shore.

It has a frustum shape, presenting brickwork with poorly faced masonry. It has a step at half height, which divides the two phases of its construction. The first phase is made of solid stone and the second of stone and brick.

The linteled entrance door is located 4.93 meters above the ground and leads to the entrance hall. This arrangement was intended to protect the lighthouse keepers from a direct assault on the building, and access to the tower was by means of a rope or wooden ladder that was later removed. The entrance opening, measuring 1.35 m by 0.57 m, is oriented towards the ground and is made of limestone.

The zaguan has a rectangular floor plan, covering the 2.05 meters of thickness of the wall, and is covered by a segmental arch, lacking the typical spill of the wall. From the vestibule there is a stairway to the roof, which in this type of watchtower usually starts from the chamber. Another peculiarity of the staircase, of sixteen steps protected by wooden nosing, is that it adapts to the curve of the wall, instead of being a spiral staircase.

The chamber of the tower has a circular floor plan, 4.60 meters in diameter, and a semi-spherical vault, from brick rigging (A soga y tizón). On the floor of the chamber is the mouth of a well.

The terrace, of 7.10 meters of interior diameter, is delimited by a parapet, which lacks artillery battlements. The half-barrel bull that marks the beginning of it is composed of a double sheet of brick, the lower one a tizón and the upper one a soga, under which three gargoyles throw the rainwater to the outside. On the roof there is a parapet 48 cm high and 40 cm wide and the bartizan of the last flight of the narrow stairs, embedded in the wall, which leads to this place from the zaguan. This bartizan has a quadrangular form and it is closed with false dome, composed by approximation of courses of rocky flagstones. It measures 2.80 meters high, 1.80 meters wide and 1.63 meters deep and is a significant element of the image of the tower because of its size, larger than other towers.

== History ==
=== Construction ===
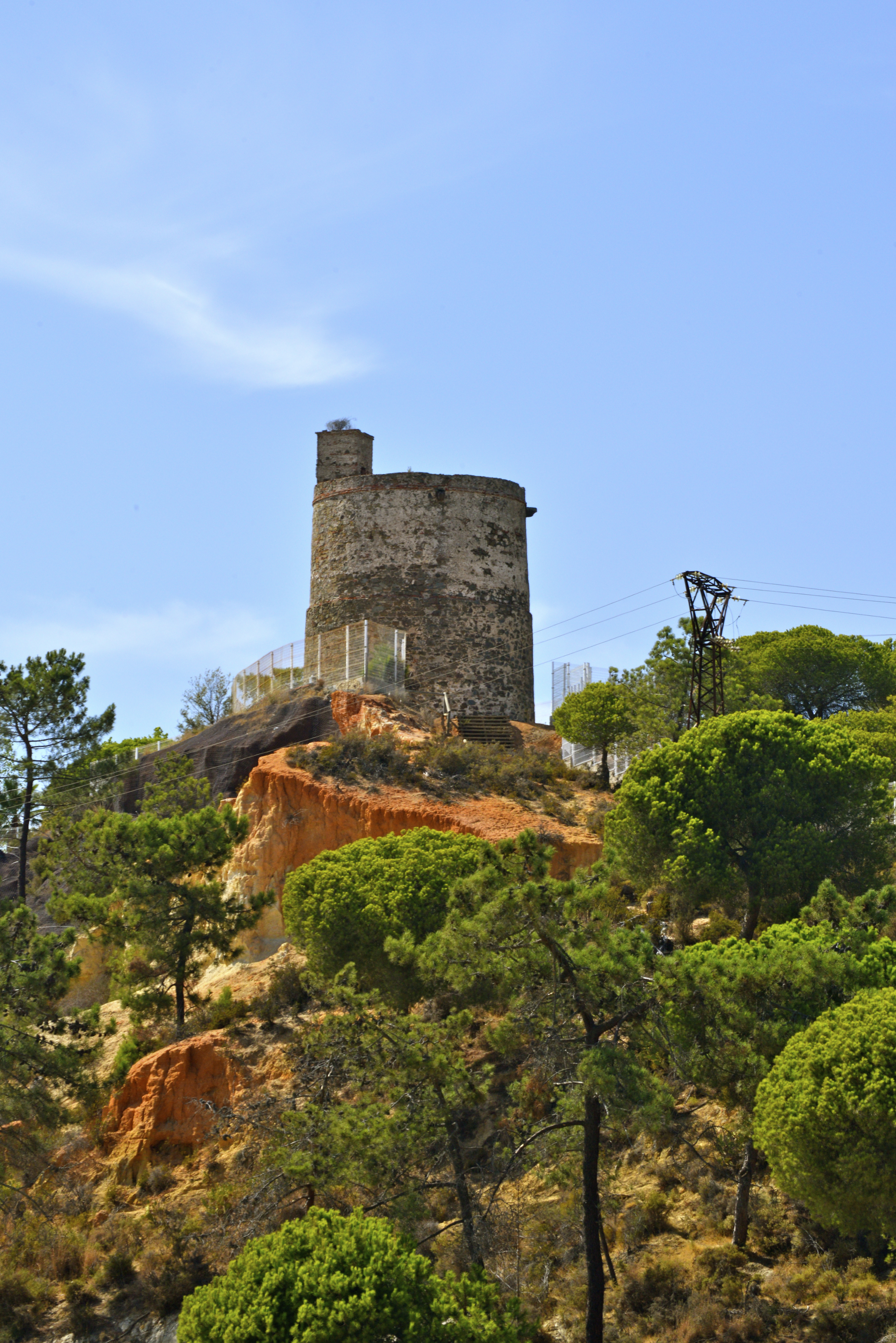
View of the Torre del Catalán over the hillock.

The construction of the Torre del Catalán is part of Philip II's plan to defend the coast against the incursions of Barbary pirates through the construction of watchtowers. The Discovery of America and trade with the Indies caused an increase in piracy on the Atlantic coast of Andalusia in the 16th century. This provoked a series of inspections and proposals between 1570 and 1576, which advised the erection of these towers along the coast. El Comendador de Hornos, Luis Bravo de Lagunas, visited the towns on the coast of Huelva and met with the aldermen of Lepe and the notary public on August 5, 1577 to communicate the royal order to build a watchtower and fort in El Terrón and a watchtower in Sierra Bermeja. The local authorities were willing to comply, but later argued against the obligation to assume the construction costs, understanding that it was more beneficial to the city of Seville than to themselves. The same position was adopted by the Marquis of Ayamonte, the Duke of Béjar, the Count of Miranda and the Duke of Medina Sidonia. In 1584, the Crown sent the lawyer Gilberto de Bedoya to promote the construction of the towers by distributing and collecting the corresponding costs from the nobles. Drake's expedition of 1587 in the Bay of Cadiz increased the interest in accelerating the construction of the coastal defensive towers and it is recorded that the Torre del Catalán was rising in June 1587 to a height of twenty feet, that is to say, about 5.60 meters high. Gilberto de Bedoya was removed from the project and the works were paralyzed for a few years. In 1590 the Council of Justice issued an order obliging the nobles to build and pay for the towers and it was after the appointment of Fernando Álvarez de Bohórquez as commission judge that the work on the Catalán tower was completed, already concluded in a visit on June 13, 1597. The two-phase construction can be seen visually through a brick cordon that separates the two phases and the smaller diameter of the upper phase, where the chamber, the entrance hall and the stairway leading to the roof are located.

As a watchtower, a visitor foresaw for it in 1618 three soldiers on guard, without artillery, which would presumably be located in the Torre de El Terrón, closer to the mouth of the Piedras River. Also in this year it seemed that the construction of the Torre de Vaciatalegas, which would be located between the Torre del Catalán and the Torre de Isla Canela, was abandoned. The assistance in the defense of the coast to the Torre del Catalán and El Terrón corresponded to the town of Lepe, according to various reports of the early 17th century.

=== Decline ===
In the 18th century, the watchtower began to decline, mainly due to its distance from the coast due to the silting up of the estuary located at the foot of its cliff. The 1755 earthquake, which knocked down 311 of the 382 existing houses in Lepe, accelerated this process and left the tower a kilometer away from the shore.

In 1720 the tower was manned by three people and in 1739 it was proposed to equip it with two 12-gauge cannons, although there is no documentary or structural evidence of this reform. The year after the earthquake, in 1756, the tower was still in service, with a Captain appointed by the Marquise of Astorga. During the rest of the 18th century it continued to appear in the coastal routes as Torre del Catalán, although a proposal for the rehabilitation of the watchtowers on the coast of Huelva in 1820 indicated that by that date they were in disuse, among them the Torre del Catalán. In worse condition was the nearby Torre de El Terrón, which in 1820 appeared as "ruined" and in 1900 as disappeared, leaving the Torre del Catalán as "the most notable building of this part of the coast".

=== Current status ===
The Torre del Catalán was protected by decree of April 22, 1949, which declares the protection of all Spanish castles. It was registered as "Bien de Interés Cultural", under the legal typology of "monument", on June 29, 1985 and in 1993 it was included in the Catálogo Andaluz de Bienes de Interés Cultural (Andalusian Catalog of Cultural Interest).

On March 14, 2015, the Torre del Catalán was part of the program of informative visits Discover your fortresses, promoted by the Colegio Oficial de Arquitectos de Huelva and the Provincial Deputation of Huelva.

The Municipality of Lepe acquired the tower and its surroundings, of approximately 600 m², in an auction held by the Tax Agency in May 2015, for a value of €39,015.73. Following the acquisition, the municipal administration agreed with Endesa in 2019 to lease an additional 320 m² for twenty-five years, automatically extendable for five-year periods and for a rent of €120 per year. The objective of this agreement is to create an Interpretation Center of the history and defensive architecture of the municipality around the tower under the project "Enhancement and accessibility of the Torre del Catalán of Lepe and development of La Vera", presented at FITUR 2020.

== In popular culture ==
- It appears as a central element in the series La logia del catalán (2014), by creator and director David Díaz.

== Bibliography ==
- Mira Toscano, Antonio; Villegas Martín, Juan (2009). "La Torre de Sierra Bermeja o del Catalán". El lugar heredado (in Spanish). University of Huelva: 13–40. ISBN 978-84-92679-44-7.
- Mora Figueroa, Luis de (1981). Torres almenara de la costa de Huelva (in Spanish). Huelva: Provincial Deputation of Huelva Lepe city hall. pp. 38–39. ISBN 84-500-4689-0.
- González Gómez, Juan Miguel (1996). "Patrimonio histórico-artístico de Lepe. Bienes muebles e inmuebles". Historia de Lepe. Una proyección hasta el futuro (in Spanish). Lepe: Lepe city hall: 569–571. ISBN 84-606-2258-4.
- González Gómez, Antonio (1982). Ordenanzas municipales de Lepe (in Spanish). Huelva: Provincial Deputation of Huelva. ISBN 978-84-50081-96-1.
