= Francisco Nocete =

Spanish archaeologist and professor

Francisco Nocete (1961 – 12 September 2024) was a Neo-Marxist Spanish archaeologist, a professor of prehistory at the University of Huelva. He died on 12 September 2024 after a short illness.

== Selected works ==
- Nocete (1988): “Estómagos bípedos/ estómagos políticos”. Arqueología Espacial 12: 119-139
- Nocete (1989): “El Espacio de la Coerción. La transición al estado en las Campiñas del Alto Guadalquivir (Espanã). 3000-1500 a.C.”. BAR International Series 492. Oxford.
- Nocete, F. and Ruiz, A. (1991): “The dialectic of the Present in the Past in the construction of a scientific archaeology”. In Baker, J. and Thomas, J. (Eds.) Writing the Past in the Present: 105-112. Lampeter.
- Nocete (1994): “Space as Coercion: The Transition to the State in the social formations of la Campiña, Upper Guadalquivir Valley, Spain. Ca. 1900-1600 BC”. Journal of Anthropological Archaeology 13: 171-200.
- Nocete et al. (1997): “Cabezo Juré. 2500 a. C. Alosno, Huelva”. Huelva.
- Nocete (2001): “Tercer Milenio antes de Nuestra Era. Relaciones y contradicciones centro/ periferia en el Valle del Guadalquivir”. Bellaterra. Barcelona.
