= Valverde del Camino =

- Municipality
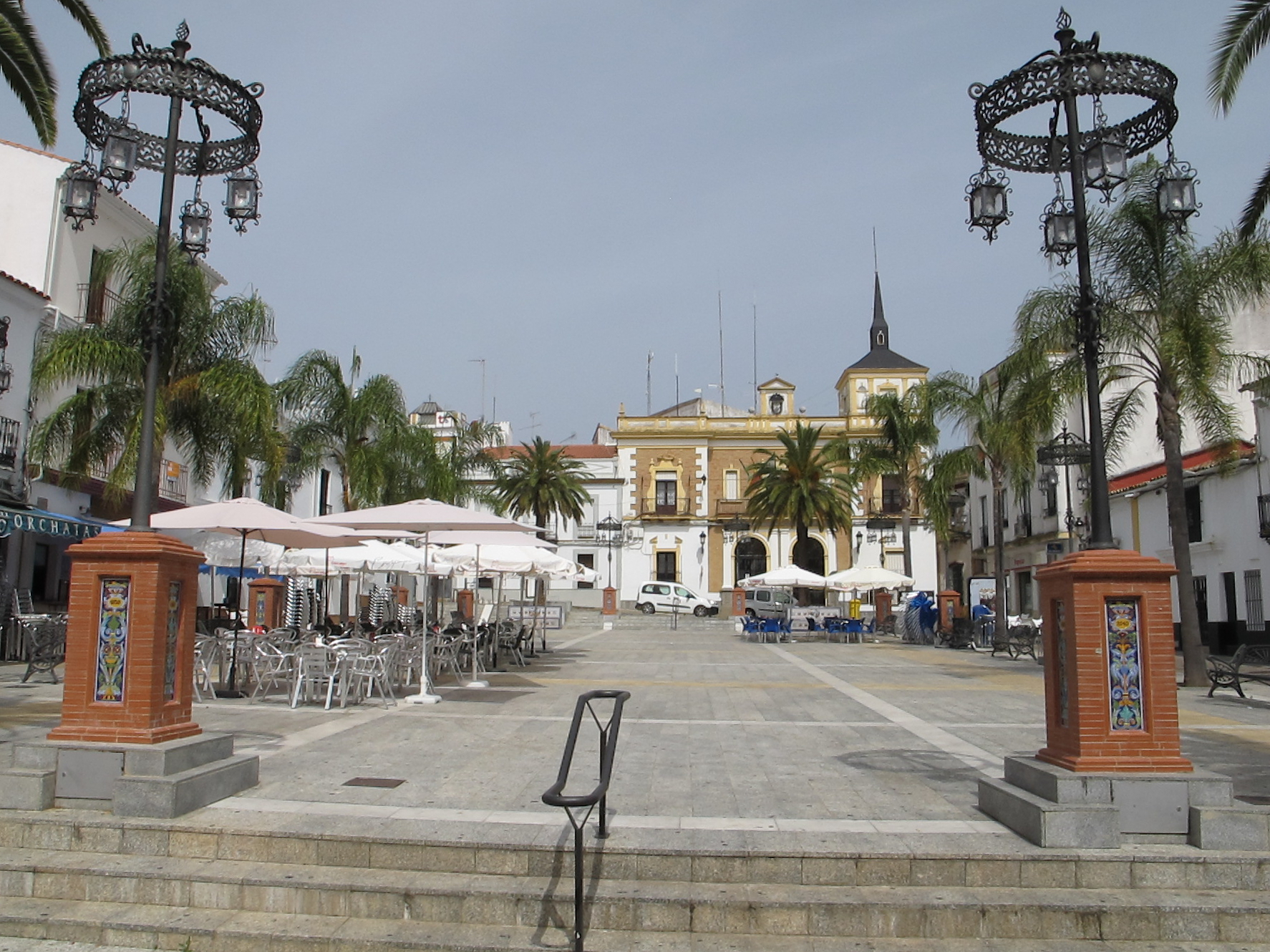

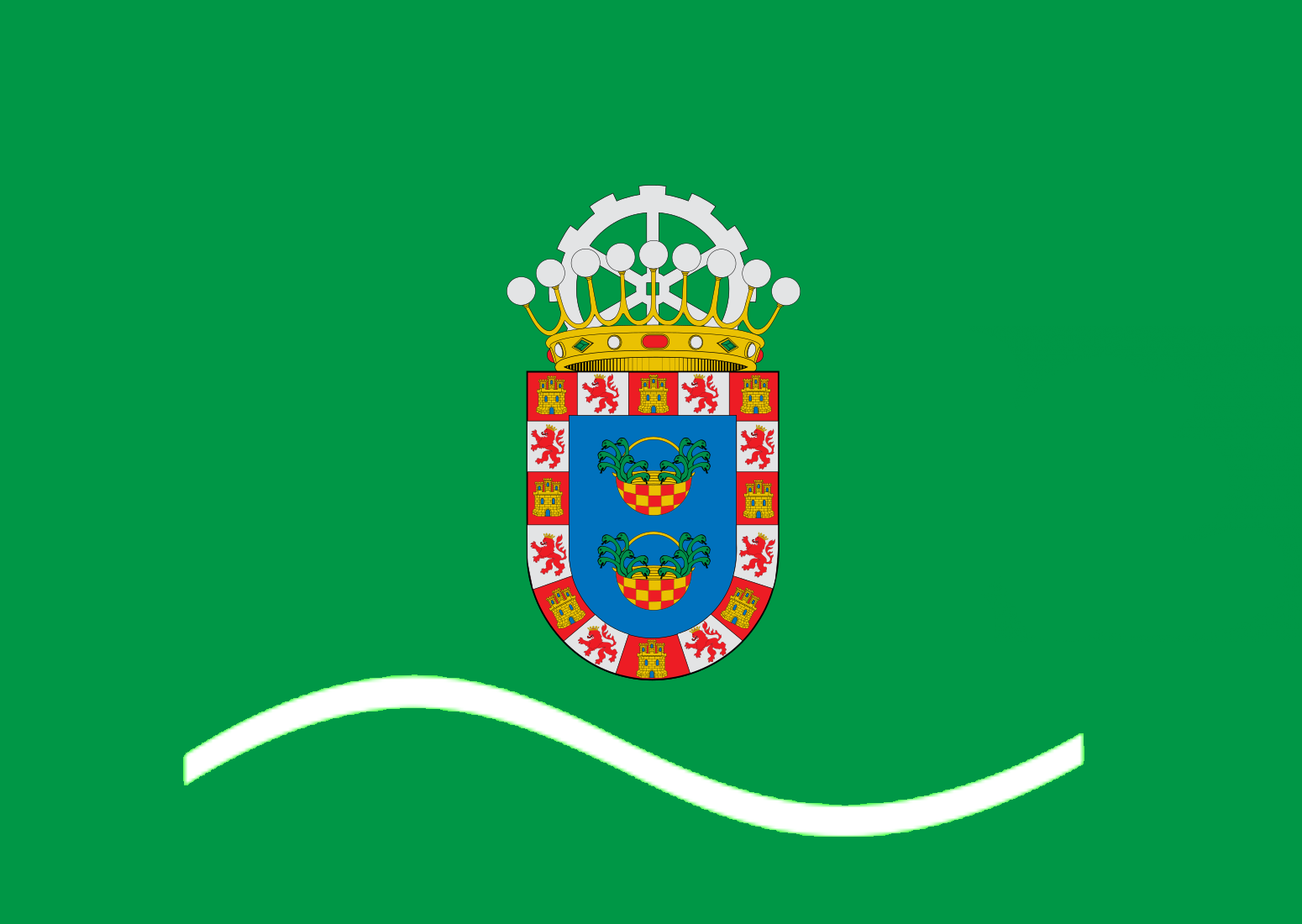
- Flag Coat of arms

- Location in Spain
- Coordinates: 37°34′26″N 6°45′16″W
- Country: Spain
- Autonomous Community: Andalusia
- Province: Huelva
- Comarca: Andévalo

Government
  - Mayor: Loles López Gabarro (PP)

Area
  - Total: 218.7 km^{2} (84.4 sq mi)
- Elevation (AMSL): 260 m (850 ft)

Population (2025-01-01)
  - Total: 12,631
  - Density: 57.75/km^{2} (149.6/sq mi)
- Time zone: UTC+1 (CET)
  - Summer (DST): UTC+2 (CEST (GMT +2))
- Postal code: 21600
- Area code: +34 (Spain) + 959 (Huelva)
- Website: Town Hall

Valverde del Camino is a town in the Huelva province of Spain. As of 2008 it has 12,000 inhabitants. It is known for its production of vaquero-style leather boots, specifically of the campero style, and for its whole leather industry as well, dating back from the early 18th century which today incorporates several small manufactures in the collective Botas De Valverde del Camino trademark. Blessed Eusebia Palomino Yenes acted in the city and died in 1935.

== See also ==
- List of municipalities in Huelva
