= Cabezo Juré =

Archaeological site in Alosno, Spain

- Type: Archaeological site
- Periods: Copper Age
- Location: Alosno, Andalusia, Spain

History
- Built: c. 2873 BC
- Abandoned: c. 2274 BC
- Archaeologists: Francisco Nocete
- Excavation dates: 1991

Cabezo Juré is an archaeological site located in Alosno, Andalusia from the 3rd millennium BC. The archaeological excavations have recently revealed the vestiges of an ancient community of workers specialized in the metallurgy of copper. Evidence of their metallurgical activity has been found in remains of various furnaces obtained at temperatures close to 2,200 °F as well as large quantities of slag by SiO_{2} saturate silicates and copper products. Calibrated radiocarbon age revealed it was active between 2873 and 2274 BC.
