= Paymogo =

- Municipality
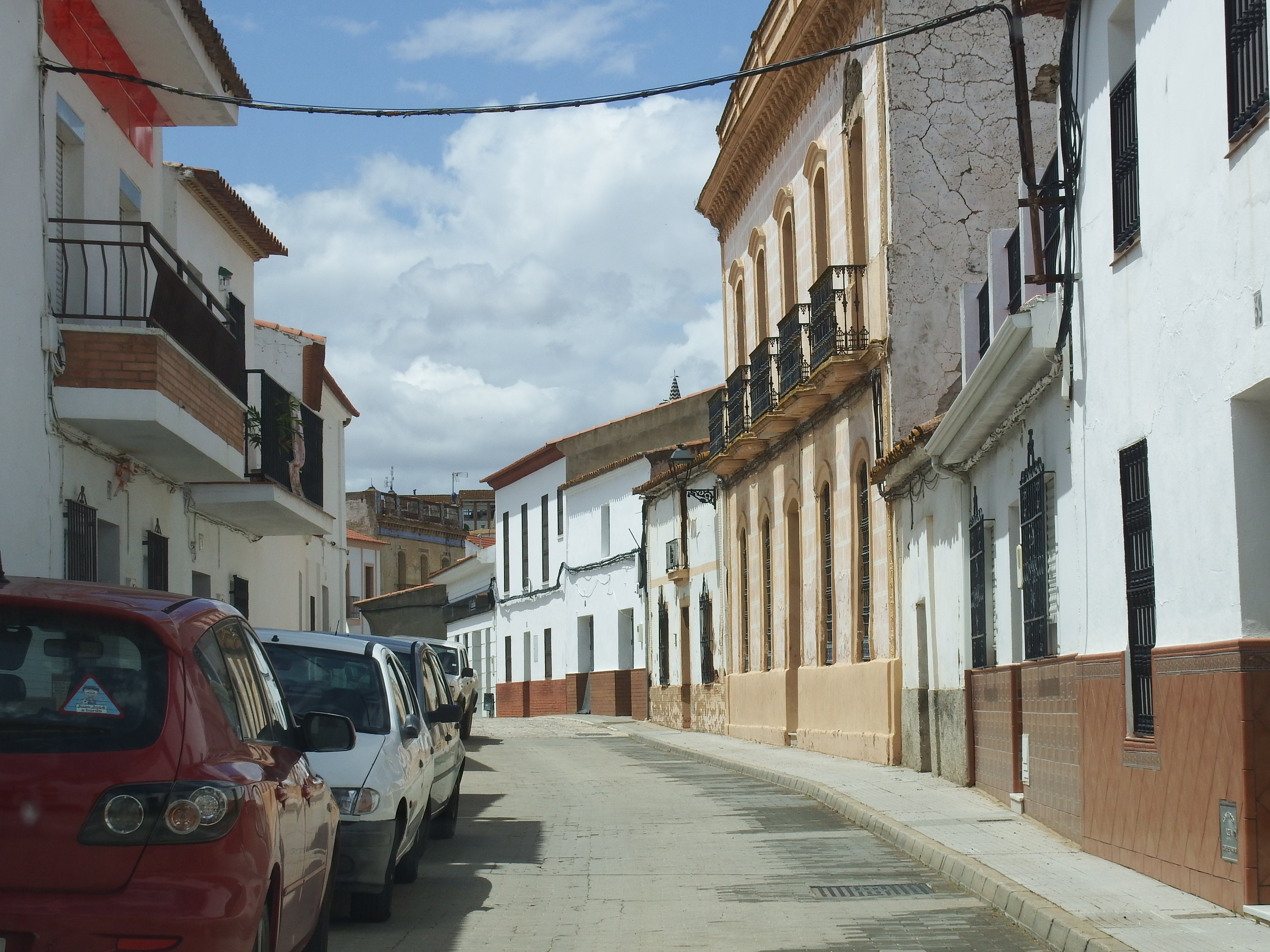
- Paymogo street view

- Flag Coat of arms

- Location in Spain.
- Coordinates: 37°45′N 7°20′W
- Country: Spain
- Autonomous community: Andalusia
- Province: Huelva
- Comarca: Andévalo

Area
  - Total: 214 km^{2} (83 sq mi)
- Elevation: 177 m (581 ft)

Population (2025-01-01)
  - Total: 1,132
  - Density: 5.29/km^{2} (13.7/sq mi)
- Demonym: Paymogueros
- Time zone: UTC+1 (CET)
  - Summer (DST): UTC+2 (CEST)
- Postal code: 21560

Paymogo is a town and municipality located in the Andévalo comarca, province of Huelva, Spain. According to the 2025 municipal register, the municipality has a population of 1,132 inhabitants. The municipality borders with Portugal on its western side.

== See also ==
- List of municipalities in Huelva
