= Alosno =

- Municipality
- Flag Coat of arms

- Location in Spain
- Coordinates: 37°32′55″N 7°06′55″W
- Country: Spain
- Autonomous community: Andalusia
- Province: Huelva
- Comarca: Andévalo

Government
  - Mayor: Juan Manuel Orta Prieto

Area
  - Total: 193 km^{2} (75 sq mi)
  - Land: 193 km^{2} (75 sq mi)
  - Water: 0.00 km^{2} (0 sq mi)

Population (2025-01-01)
  - Total: 3,986
  - Density: 20.7/km^{2} (53.5/sq mi)
- Time zone: UTC+1 (CET)
  - Summer (DST): UTC+2 (CEST)
- Postal code: 21520

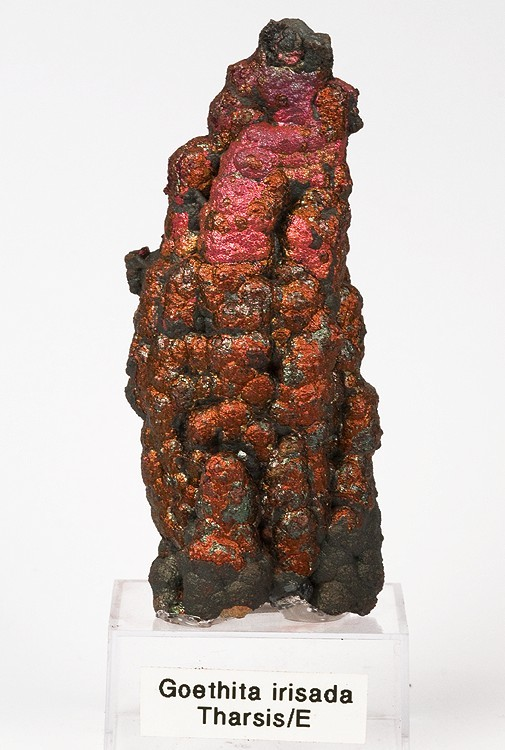
Iridescent goethite, Filón Sur Mine, Alosno, Huelva, Spain.

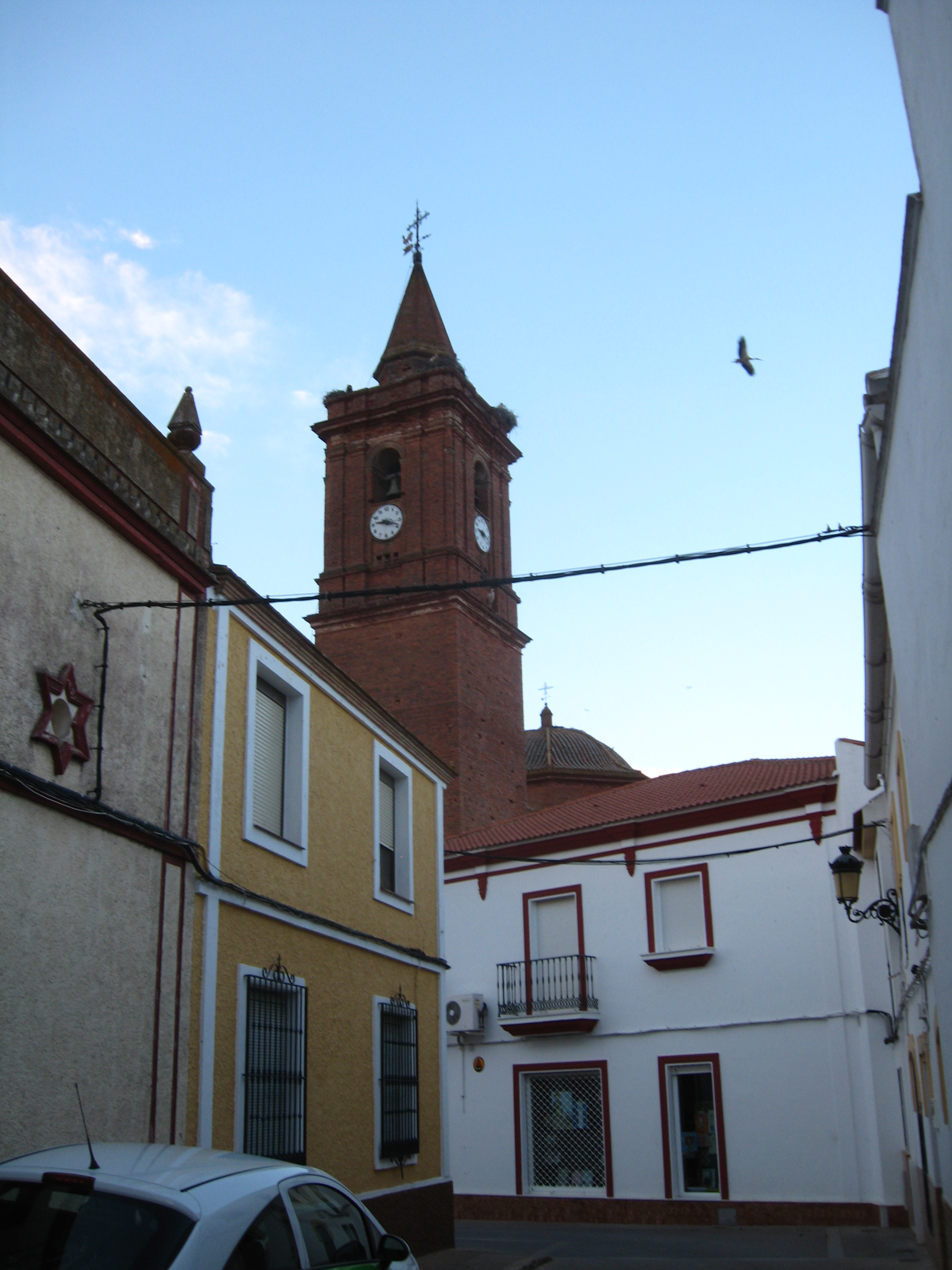
Main clocktower of Catholic church at town center.

Alosno is a town and municipality located in the province of Huelva, Spain. According to the 2025 municipal register, the village has a population of 3,988 inhabitants. The Filon Sur Mine, in Alosno municipality, is a notable source of fine specimens of the mineral goethite. Nearby is a 4500+ year old copper smelting archeological site named Cabezo Juré.

The region is notable for production of fine ham, Jamon Serrano, through a system of pasturing and finishing on Holm oak's sweet acorns ( Bellotas ). The chorizo and local Manchego sheep cheeses are also outstanding. Much of the best land is also planted with green olives, for oil or for storage whole in brine. The town's style is very mediterranean with whitewashed walls and cobbles or concrete walks. Approximately 15 Bar/Grills and a number of more formal dinner restaurants line the main street in/out of town, with a main market and outdoor market also selling produce from stalls. Very low humidity makes up for the heat, and ocean moderating winds are common. Green countrysides start the year off with spring rains and progresses on to gold with the dry summers. Frost and snow are very rare.

Proximity to a prominent rock climbing face and centuries old nunnery and chapels.

Alosno is "Cuna del Fandango" and is famous within Spain for flamenco players and festivals. Other important festivals are Cruces de Mayo, San Juan, Visperas, and many more.

== Notable people ==
The noted Spanish boxer Pedro Carrasco, and the fandango singer Paco Toronjo were born in Alosno.

== Demographics ==
Historical population
Year	Pop.	±%
1999	4,843	—
2000	4,834	−0.2%
2001	4,792	−0.9%
2002	4,670	−2.5%
2003	4,514	−3.3%
2004	4,419	−2.1%
2005	4,514	+2.1%

== Villages ==
- Tharsis

== See also ==
- List of municipalities in Huelva
