= Villanueva de las Cruces =

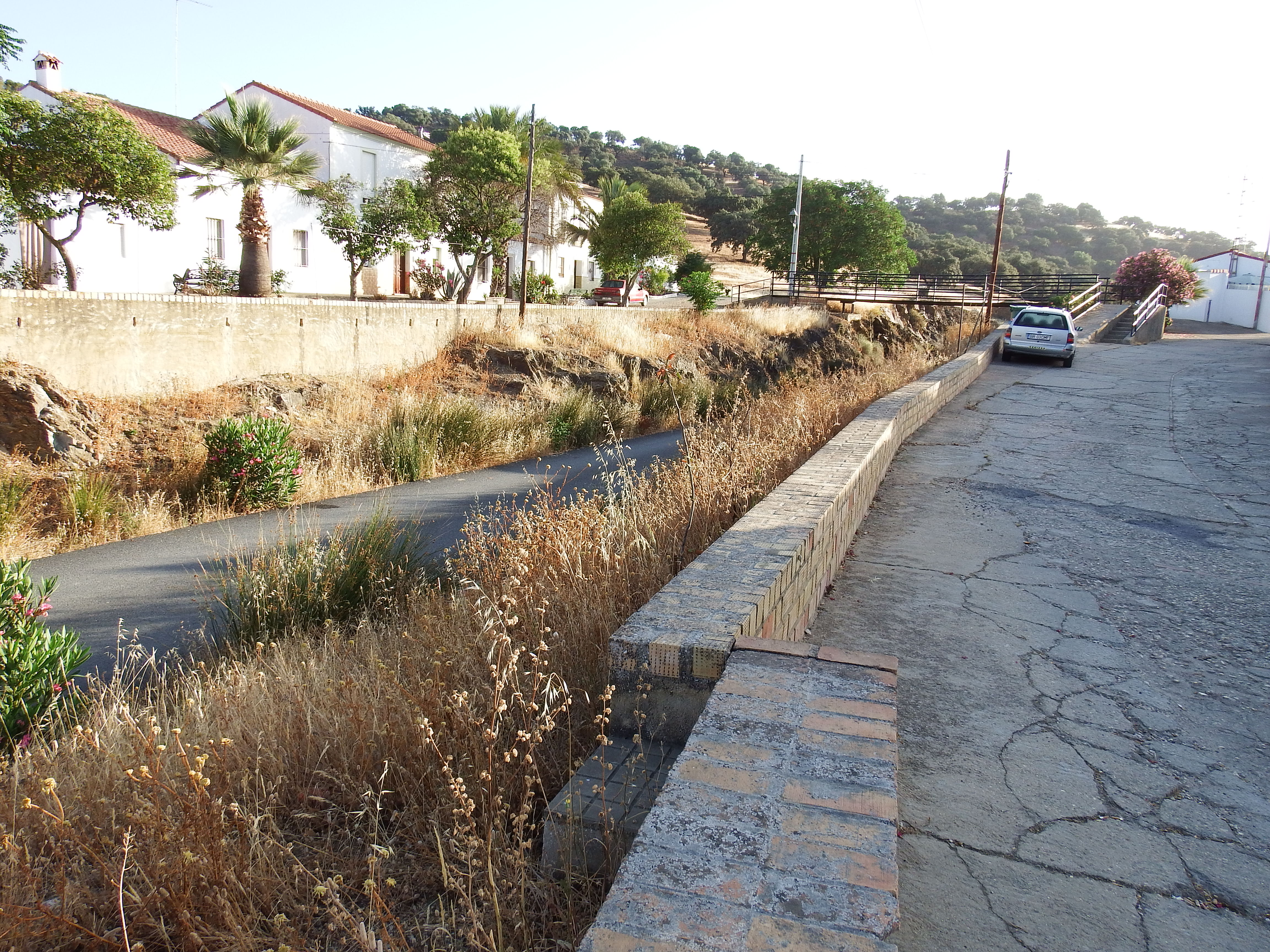

- Flag Coat of arms

- Location of Villanueva de las Cruces in Spain
- Coordinates: 37°38′N 7°01′W
- Country: Spain
- Autonomous community: Andalusia
- Province: Huelva

Population (2025-01-01)
  - Total: 379
- Time zone: UTC+1 (CET)
  - Summer (DST): UTC+2 (CEST)
- Website: http://www.villanuevadelascruces.es/es/

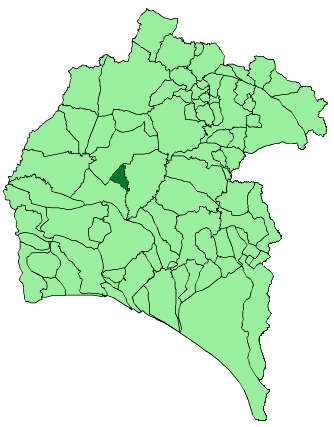
Map of Villanueva de las Cruces, Huelva

Villanueva de las Cruces is a town and municipality located in the province of Huelva, Spain. According to the 2007 census, the municipality had a population of 416 inhabitants.

== See also ==
- List of municipalities in Huelva
