= Cabezas Rubias =

Cabezas Rubias, Spain
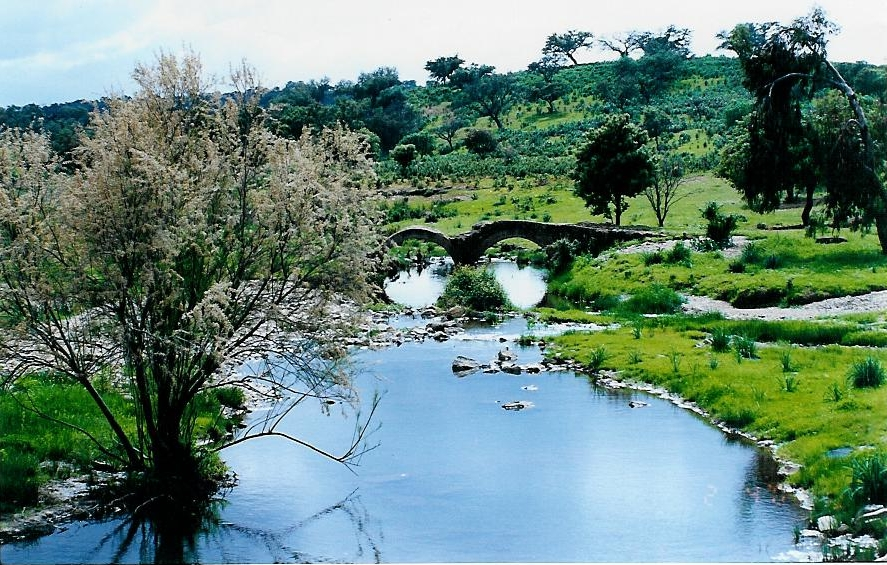

- Flag Coat of arms

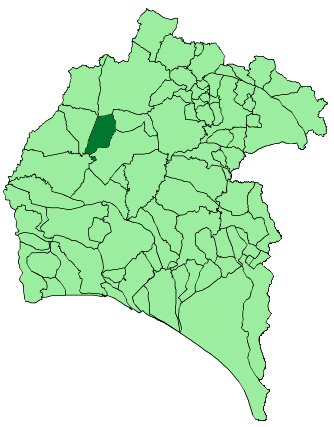
- Location of Cabezas Rubias
- Coordinates: 37°43′N 7°05′W
- Municipality: Huelva

Government
  - Mayor: Esteban Naranjo Borrero

Area
  - Total: 109 km^{2} (42 sq mi)
  - Land: 109 km^{2} (42 sq mi)
  - Water: 0.00 km^{2} (0 sq mi)

Population (2025-01-01)
  - Total: 694
  - Density: 6.37/km^{2} (16.5/sq mi)
- Time zone: UTC+1 (CET)
  - Summer (DST): UTC+2 (CEST)

Cabezas Rubias is a town and municipality located in the province of Huelva, Spain. According to the 2025 municipal register, it has a population of 694 inhabitants and covers a 109 km² area.

== Demographics ==
Historical population
Year	Pop.	±%
1999	969	—
2000	962	−0.7%
2001	956	−0.6%
2002	929	−2.8%
2003	935	+0.6%
2004	899	−3.9%
2005	873	−2.9%
Source: INE (Spain)

== See also ==
- List of municipalities in Huelva
