= San Bartolomé de la Torre =

Coordinates: 37°27′N 7°06′W

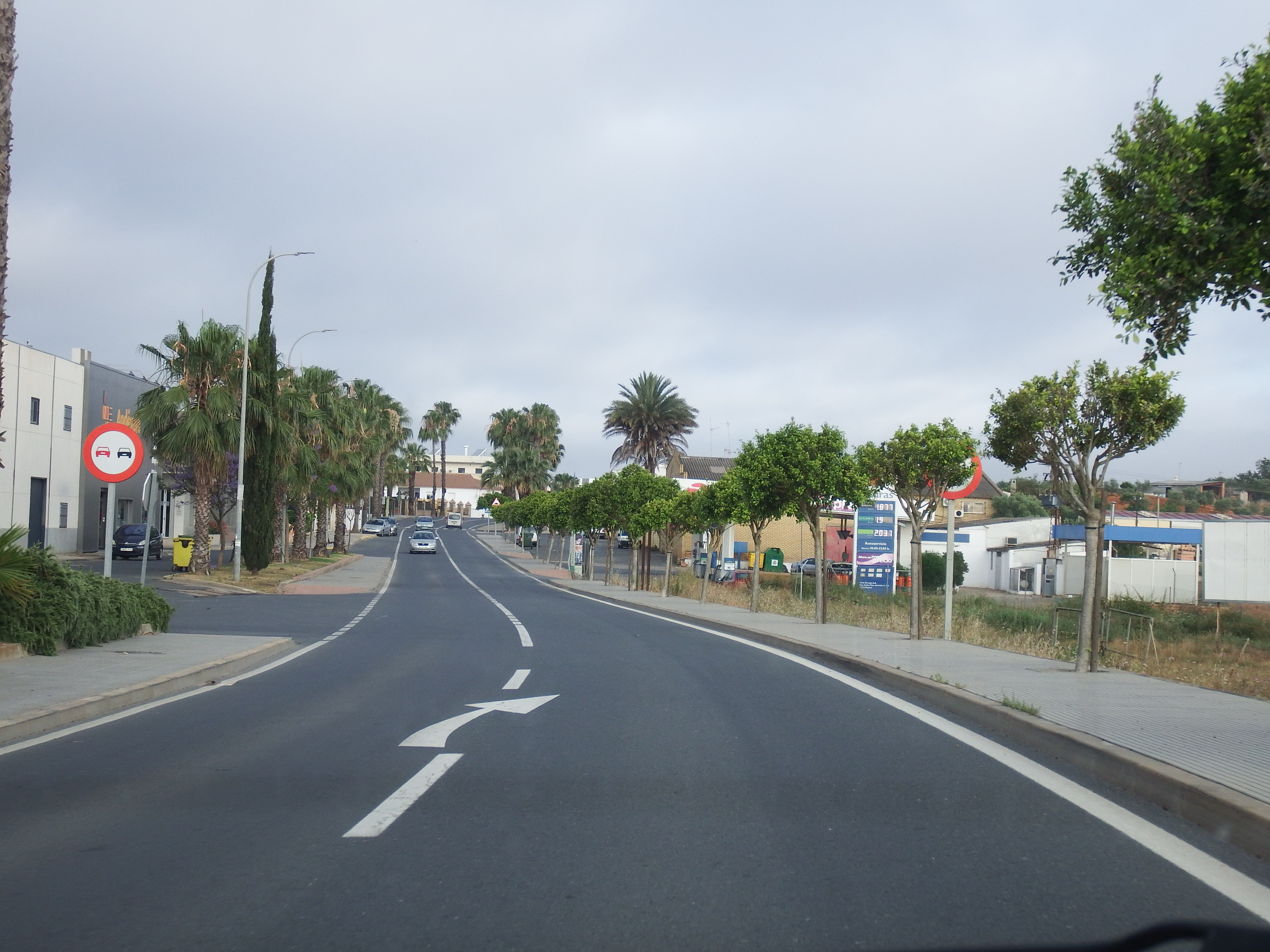

- Flag Coat of arms

- Location in Spain.
- Country: Spain
- Autonomous community: Andalusia
- Province: Huelva

Area
  - Total: 56.61 km^{2} (21.86 sq mi)
- Elevation: 128 m (420 ft)

Population (2025-01-01)
  - Total: 4,072
  - Density: 71.93/km^{2} (186.3/sq mi)
- Time zone: UTC+1 (CET)
  - Summer (DST): UTC+2 (CEST)
- Website: http://www.sanbartolomedelatorre.es/es/

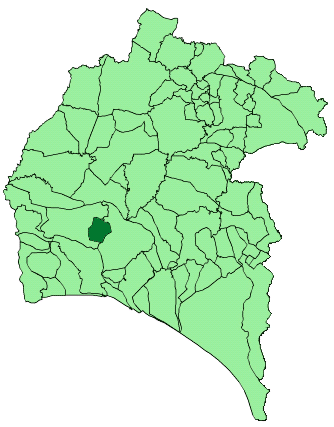
Map of San Bartolomé de la Torre, Huelva

San Bartolomé de la Torre is a town and municipality located in the province of Huelva, Spain. According to the 2008 census, the municipality had a population of 3446 inhabitants.

== See also ==
- List of municipalities in Huelva
