= Santa Bárbara de Casa =

Coordinates: 37°48′N 7°11′W

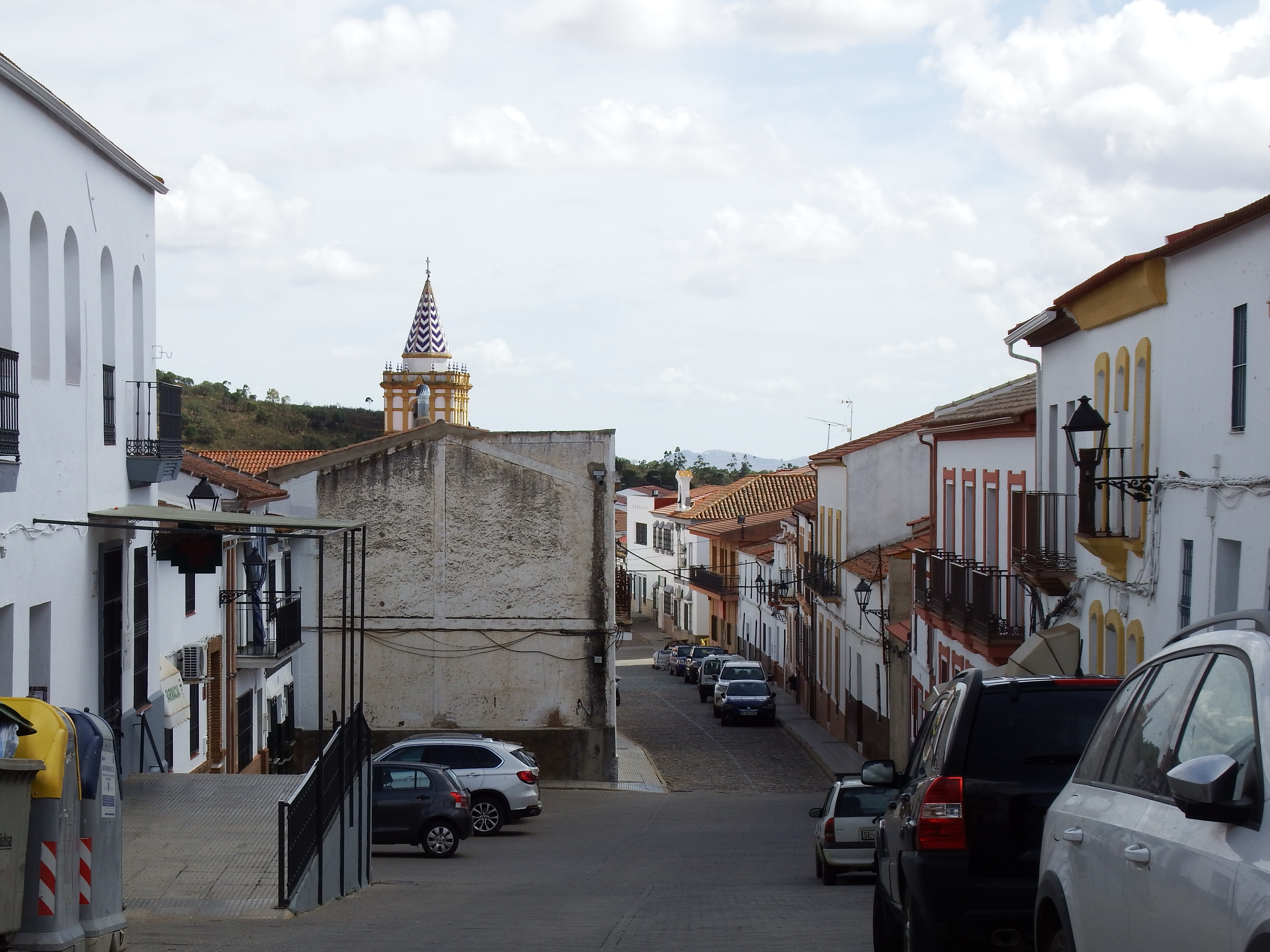

- Flag Coat of arms

- Location in Spain.
- Country: Spain
- Autonomous community: Andalusia
- Province: Huelva

Area
  - Total: 147 km^{2} (57 sq mi)
- Elevation: 316 m (1,037 ft)

Population (2025-01-01)
  - Total: 1,144
  - Density: 7.78/km^{2} (20.2/sq mi)
- Time zone: UTC+1 (CET)
  - Summer (DST): UTC+2 (CEST)
- Website: http://www.santabarbaradecasa.es/es/

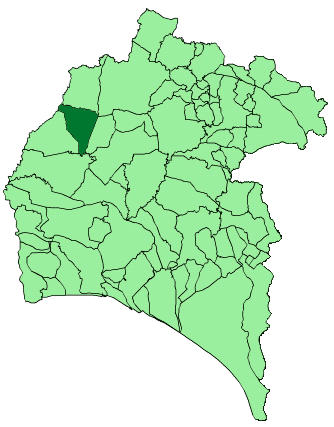
Map of Santa Bárbara de Casa.

Santa Bárbara de Casa (pop. 1,237, 2004 census) is a town in Spain, in the county of Huelva. It lies 80 km from Huelva.

== History ==
It was reconquered from the Moors by Alfonso X, and passed to the noble family of Guzmán. The area was surveyed on December 5, 1550, and the town was called Santa Barvola. In 1643, the town was sacked by the Portuguese. The area suffered depopulation but recovered in the 18th century. It was renamed in 1916, Casa being the name of a stream near the town.

== See also ==
- List of municipalities in Huelva
