= Villanueva de los Castillejos =

Coordinates: 37°30′N 7°16′W

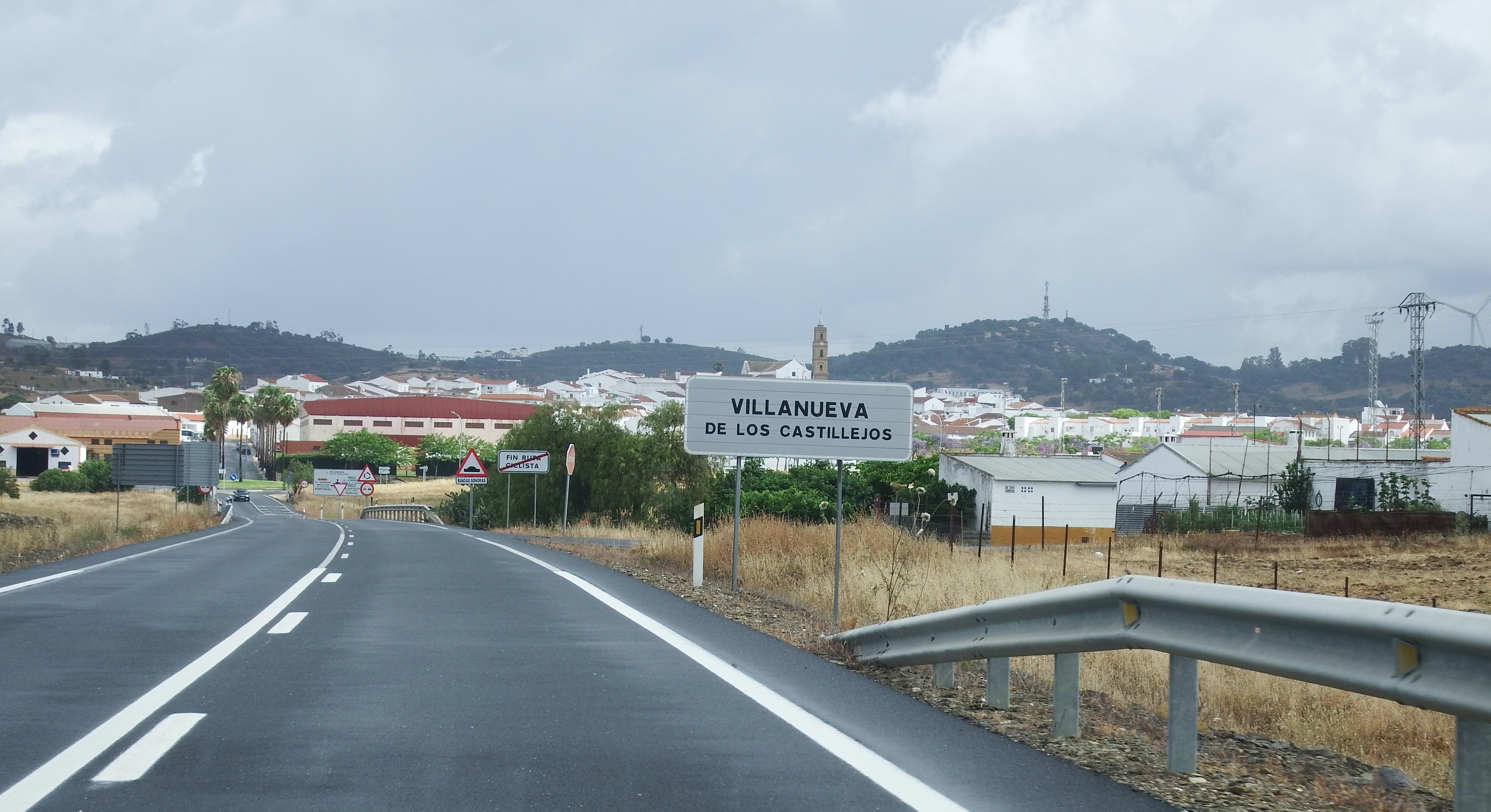

- Flag Coat of arms

- Location in Spain.
- Country: Spain
- Autonomous community: Andalusia
- Province: Huelva

Area
  - Total: 264 km^{2} (102 sq mi)
- Elevation: 224 m (735 ft)

Population (2025-01-01)
  - Total: 2,967
  - Density: 11.2/km^{2} (29.1/sq mi)
- Time zone: UTC+1 (CET)
  - Summer (DST): UTC+2 (CEST)
- Website: http://www.villanuevadeloscastillejos.es/es/

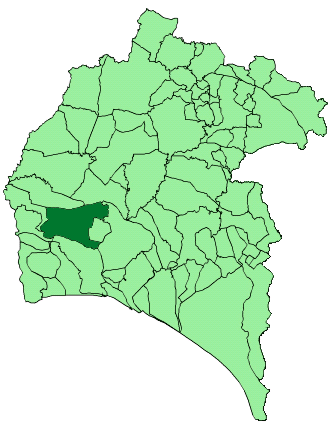
Map of Villanueva de los Castillejos, Huelva

Villanueva de los Castillejos is a town and municipality located in the province of Huelva, Spain. According to the 2008 census, the municipality had a population of 2783 inhabitants.

== See also ==
- List of municipalities in Huelva
