= Calañas =

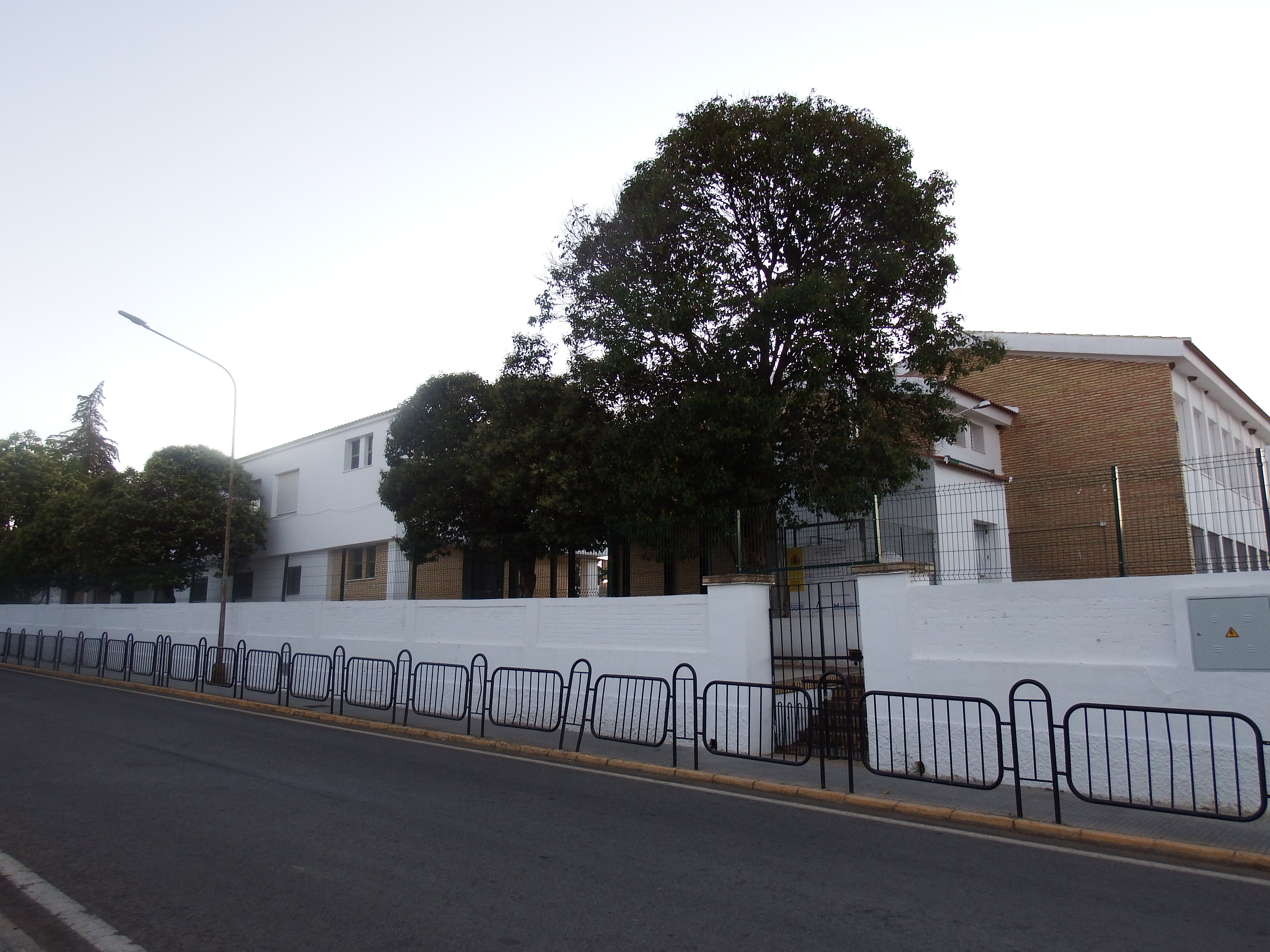

- Flag Coat of arms

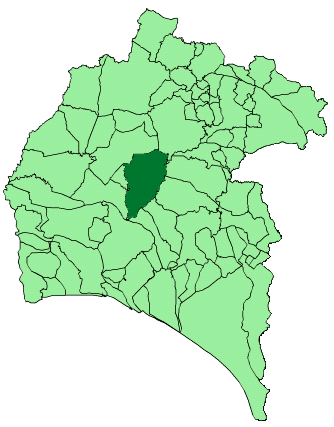

- Location of Calañas in Spain
- Coordinates: 37°39′N 6°53′W
- Country: Spain
- Autonomous community: Andalusia
- Province: Granada

Area
  - Total: 237.83 km^{2} (91.83 sq mi)
- Elevation: 291 m (955 ft)

Population (2025-01-01)
  - Total: 2,749
  - Density: 11.56/km^{2} (29.94/sq mi)
- Time zone: UTC+1 (CET)
  - Summer (DST): UTC+2 (CEST)

Calañas is a town and municipality located in the province of Huelva, Spain. According to the 2025 municipal register, the city has a population of 2,749 inhabitants.

== Demographics ==
Historical population
Year	Pop.	±%
1999	4,873	—
2000	4,725	−3.0%
2001	4,646	−1.7%
2002	4,619	−0.6%
2003	4,553	−1.4%
2004	4,534	−0.4%
2005	4,478	−1.2%
Source: INE (Spain)

== See also ==
- List of municipalities in Huelva
