= San Silvestre de Guzmán =

Coordinates: 37°23′N 7°21′W

- Flag Coat of arms

- Location in Spain.
- Country: Spain
- Autonomous community: Andalusia
- Province: Huelva

Area
  - Total: 49 km^{2} (19 sq mi)
- Elevation: 34 m (112 ft)

Population (2025-01-01)
  - Total: 649
  - Density: 13/km^{2} (34/sq mi)
- Time zone: UTC+1 (CET)
  - Summer (DST): UTC+2 (CEST)
- Website: http://www.sansilvestredeguzman.es/es/

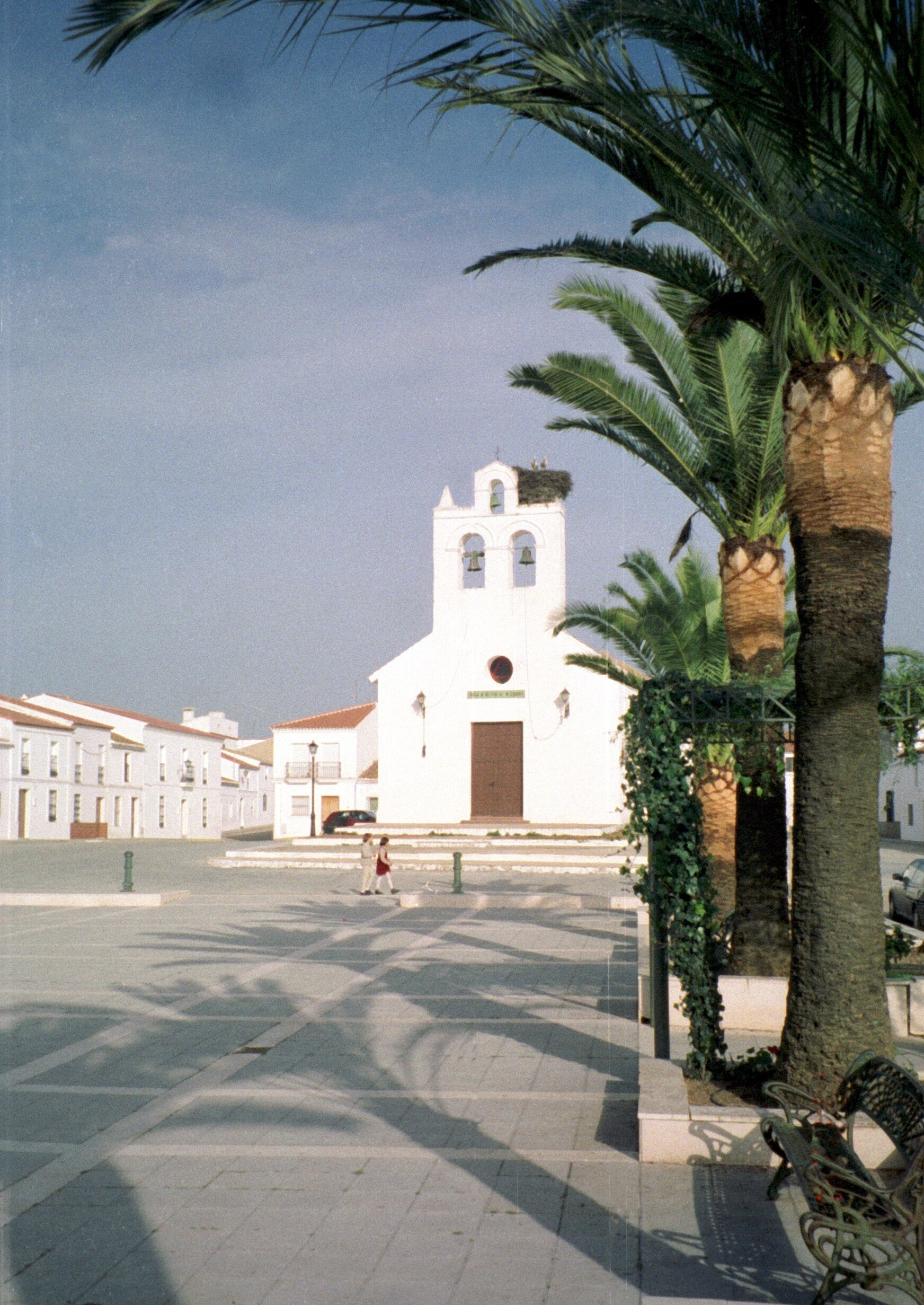
Silvestre de Guzmán, the Silvestre de Guzmán and the church Nuestra Señora del Rosario

San Silvestre de Guzmán is a municipality of Huelva.
