= Lepe =

- Municipality
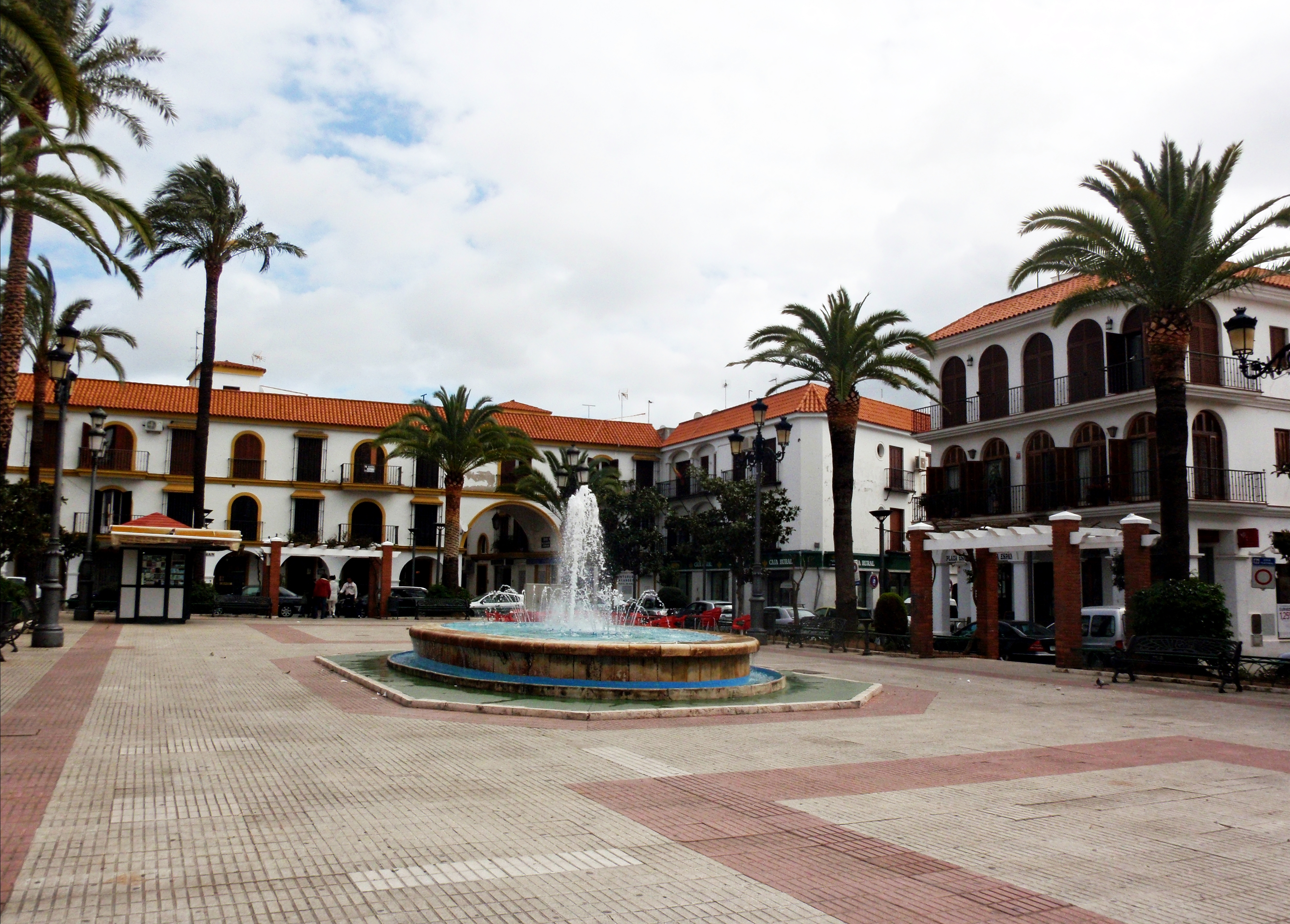
- Plaza España, Lepe

- Flag Coat of arms

- Location in Spain. Lepe (Spain)
- Coordinates: 37°15′15″N 7°12′12″W
- Country: Spain
- Autonomous community: Andalusia
- Province: Huelva
- Comarca: Costa Occidental

Government
  - Mayor: Juan Manuel González Camacho

Area
  - Total: 129 km^{2} (50 sq mi)
- Elevation: 18 m (59 ft)

Population (2025-01-01)
  - Total: 29,677
  - Density: 230/km^{2} (596/sq mi)
- Demonym: Leperos
- Time zone: UTC+1 (CET)
  - Summer (DST): UTC+2 (CEST)
- Website: Official website

Lepe is a Spanish town in the province of Huelva, in the autonomous community of Andalusia. It is near the Portuguese border. According to the 2025 municipal register, the city has a population of 29,877 inhabitants.

== Economy ==
Until the late 1970s its economy was based on fishing but Lepe is now one of the wealthiest villages in the region thanks to its intensive farming of strawberries, which are exported all over Europe.

Lepe is known for its strawberries, and for Spanish jokes referring to its inhabitants as stupid.

== History ==
Although deposits of Neolithic and Bronze Age have been found, there is no evidence of stable settlements in the municipality of Lepe. During the initial period of Roman rule, Lepe there was a rustic villa. There were fish farms at the present location of Lepe, Valsequillo and El Terrón. The retreat of the coast caused the abandonment of the settlement of Valsequillo, while fishing by El Terrón has continued until today. It is during the heyday of Roman rule when it blooms Lepe settlement located in a small village, linked to farming their fields and fishing port of El Terron. Based on classical texts, several authors have identified the current location of Lepe settlements with Laipe Megala (Rodrigo Caro, 1634), Laepa (García y Bellido, 1947; G. Bonsor, JP and E. Garrido Orta, 1922) and Praesidium (Luzon, 1975). Of all these options is Laepa which has more support among historians, although as a small country villa rather than a village itself. It is after the second wave of Arab conquests when Lepe becomes the economic center of the area, growing from a small farmhouse to a "city about the Ocean Sea," as was described by the geographer Yaqut al-Hamawi later in the 1229. The name given during the period of Arab rule is Labb, which derives in the current name.

Several of Lepe’s former inhabitants played an important part in Christopher Columbus’s discovery of the Americas, as the sailor Rodrigo de Triana was the first to sight the coast of the Americas.

In the late 16th century, Marcos Alonso de la Garza left Lepe and settled in what is today the Mexican state of Durango, beginning a line of descendants, including Cpt. Blas María de la Garza Falcón, a conquistador of the state of Nuevo León.

== Main sights ==
In the village is the 14th-century Iglesia de Santo Domingo de Guzmán built in the Mudéjar style. It houses Lepe's patron saint, the Virgen de la Bella (Beautiful Virgin). Just outside the village, off the road to El Terrón, is the Ermita de Nuestra Señora de la Bella, a 14th-century hermitage dedicated to the Virgin. On the second Saturday in May there is a pilgrimage from Lepe to the hermitage, where the figure of the Virgen de la Bella is carried from the Iglesia de Santo Domingo to the Ermita.

Built under Philip II of Spain is the Torre del Catalán, a 16th-century lookout tower, used to warn of an impending invasion by Berber pirates. One can climb the tower for views of a nature reserve, the Paraje Natural Marismas del Río Piedras y la Flecha de Nueva Umbria.

Lepe's main beach is La Antilla, 5 km south of Lepe. Located 5 km northeast of La Antilla and 5 km south of Lepe is the small fishing port of El Terrón. It has fine views across to El Rompido and the a nature reserve of the Marismas del Río Piedras.

Lepe's wines, which were exported to England in the Middle Ages, were mentioned in Chaucer's The Canterbury Tales.

== Sport ==
Lepe is home to San Roque de Lepe who play in the third division of Spanish football in the Segunda División B Group 4. The club play at Estadio Ciudad de Lepe, a purpose built stadium opened in 2011.

== Twin towns ==
- Lagoa, Portugal
- Tomelloso, Spain
- (Romania) Fetești, România

== See also ==
- List of municipalities in Huelva
- Higuera mill
- Santa María La Bella Convent
