= El Almendro, Spain =

El Almendro
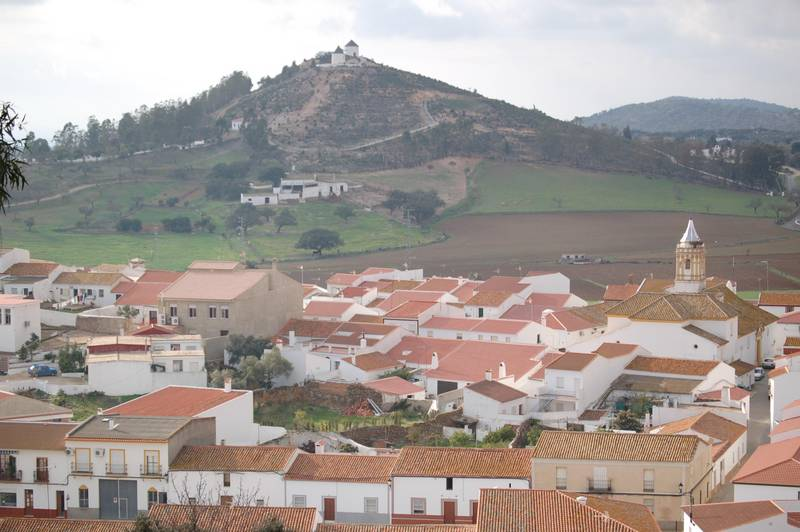
- View of El Almendro

- Flag Coat of arms

- Location of El Almendro in Spain
- Coordinates: 37°30′N 7°16′W
- Country: Spain
- Autonomous community: Andalusia
- Province: Huelva

Area
  - Total: 170.61 km^{2} (65.87 sq mi)
- Elevation: 235 m (771 ft)

Population (2025-01-01)
  - Total: 862
  - Density: 5.05/km^{2} (13.1/sq mi)
- Time zone: UTC+1 (CET)
  - Summer (DST): UTC+2 (CEST)

El Almendro is a town and municipality located in the province of Huelva, Spain. According to the 2025 municipal register, the city has a population of 882 inhabitants.

== Demographics ==
Historical population
Year	Pop.	±%
1999	874	—
2000	864	−1.1%
2001	851	−1.5%
2002	823	−3.3%
2003	841	+2.2%
2004	834	−0.8%
2005	831	−0.4%
Source: INE (Spain)

== Main sights ==
- Church of Guadalupe
- Hermitage of Piedras Albas

== See also ==
- List of municipalities in Huelva
