= Higuera mill =

Ruins of a mill in Lepe, Spain

Coordinates: 37°15′10″N 7°10′22″W

- Molino de la Higuera
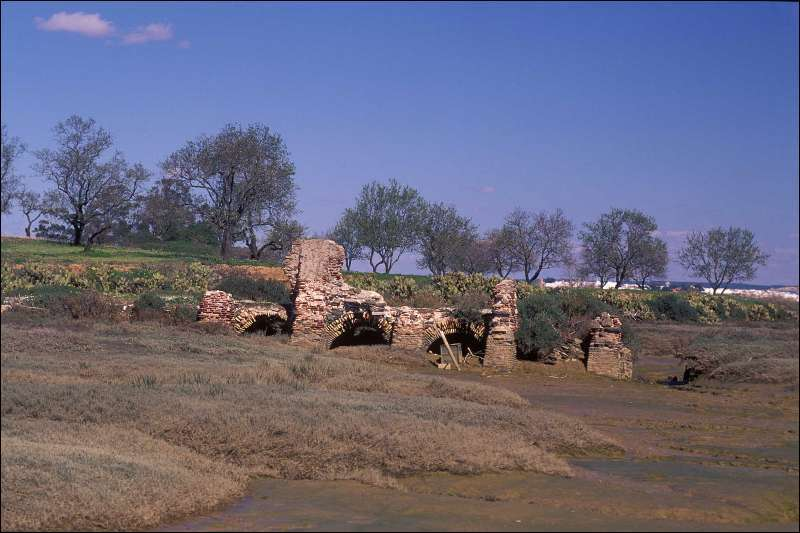

Tide mill
- Current status: Ruins
- Location: Lepe, Spain

The Higuera mill (Spanish: Molino de la Higuera) is a tide mill in ruins located in Lepe, in the province of Huelva, Spain.

== History ==
The first known tide mill was built in Ireland in the 7th century. This type of infrastructure proliferated along the Atlantic coast of Europe during the Middle Ages and especially after the great discoveries, when maritime routes increased the need for flour. They were initially owned by religious orders or noblemen, who leased them to private individuals, and were not privatized until the 18th to 19th centuries. These were environmentally sustainable infrastructures integrated into the natural environment, which, however, fell into disuse due to their lack of profitability and productivity in the 19th century after the Industrial Revolution.

On the coast of Huelva, there is evidence of tide mills in Gibraleón, Moguer and Ayamonte, dating back to the 15th to 16th centuries.

== Description ==
The mill stands on a small elevation of the land and is rectangular in shape. The remains of the base and some ruined walls can be seen, oriented on a northwest-southeast axis. Under it, there are at least four cavities, finished off in brick and separated by the starlings. The main hypothesis is that the mill used the technology of a channel wheel and it is known from the remains found that the milling capacity was that of four millstones.

== Location and surroundings ==
The mill was fed by the Piedras river and is located at the end of a dirt road, which has its access located between the Camino de Malascarnes and the Camino del Cementerio. The marshes where the mill is located are part of the Piedras river marshes and Flecha del Rompido, a natural area that has been protected since 1989.

== Protection and state of conservation ==
The Molino de la Higuera was registered in the General Catalog of Andalusian Historical Heritage as a property of general cataloging on June 23, 2010.
