= Province of Huelva =

Province of Spain

Province of Huelva Provincia de Huelva (Spanish)
- Province
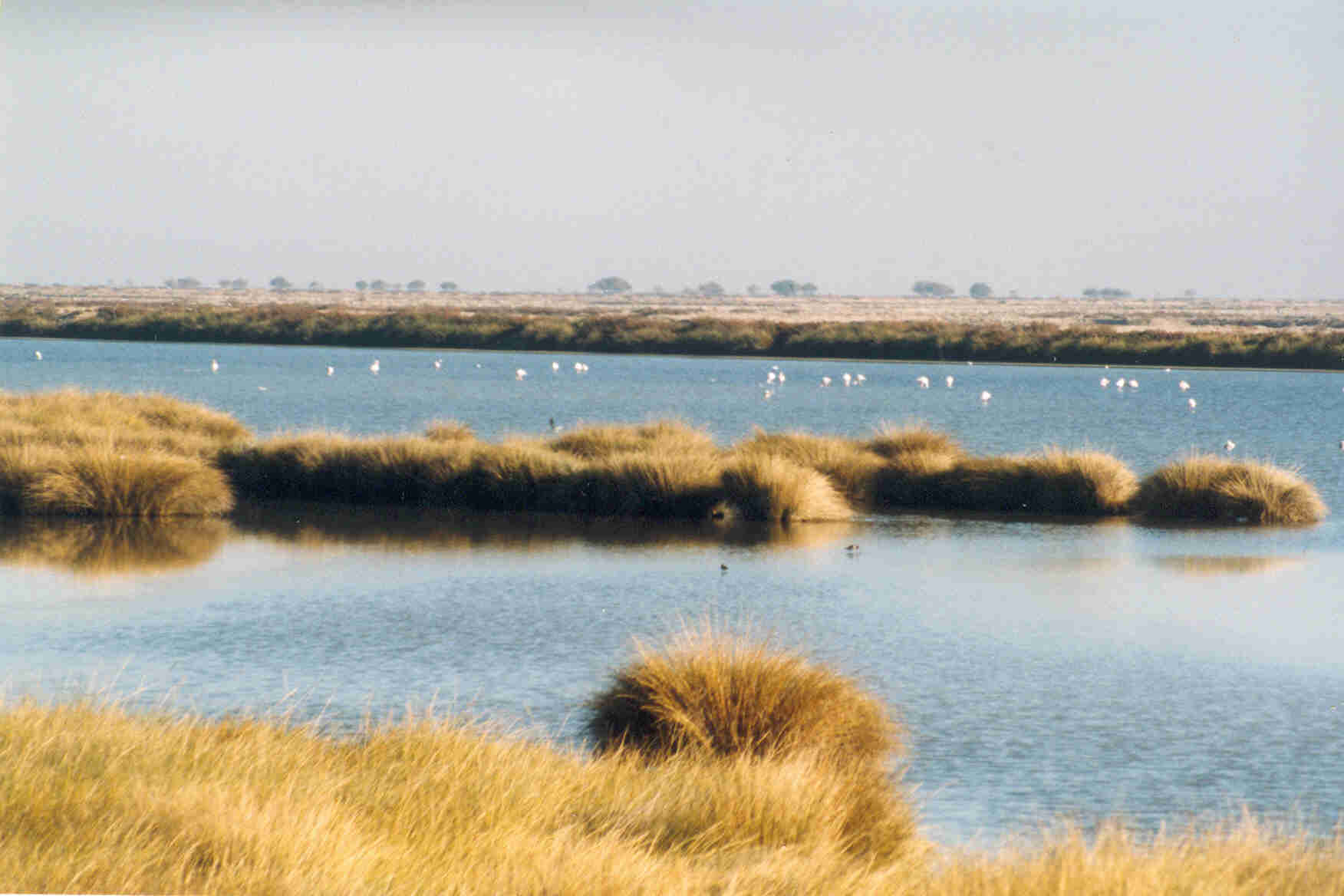
- A wetland area of Doñana National Park

- Flag Coat of arms

- Location of the Province of Huelva in Spain
- Coordinates: 37°33′N 6°55′W
- Country: Spain
- Autonomous community: Andalusia
- Capital: Huelva
- Municipalities: 80

Government
  - Body: Provincial Deputation of Huelva
  - President: Ignacio Caraballo (PSOE)

Area
  - Total: 10,127.43 km^{2} (3,910.22 sq mi)
  - Rank: 25th in Spain

Population (2025)
  - Total: 538,789
  - Rank: 29th in Spain
  - Density: 53.2010/km^{2} (137.790/sq mi)
- Time zone: UTC+1 (CET)
  - Summer (DST): UTC+2 (CEST)
- Parliament: Cortes Generales

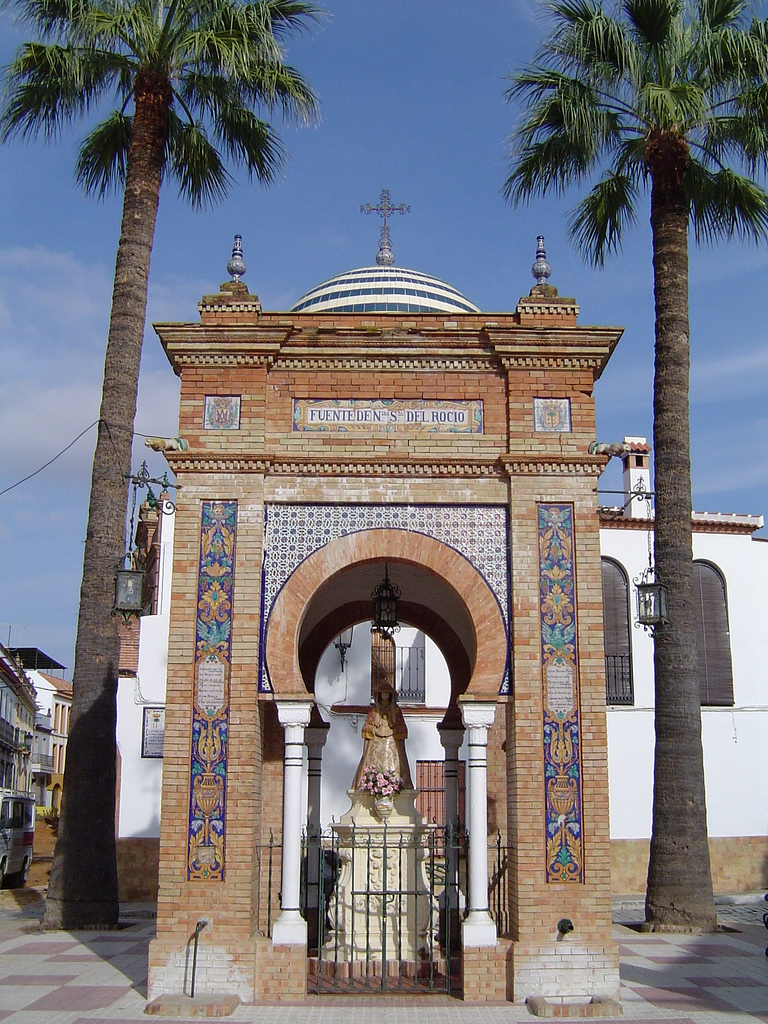
Fuente de Nuestra Señora del Rocío, La Palma del Condado

The Province of Huelva (Spanish: Provincia de Huelva [ˈwelβa], locally [ˈgweɾβa]) is a province of southern Spain, in the western part of the autonomous community of Andalusia. It is bordered by Portugal, the provinces of Badajoz, Seville, and Cádiz, and the Atlantic Ocean. Its capital is the city of Huelva.

It has a population of 538,789 in an area of 10,127.43 square kilometres (3,910.22 sq mi) across its 80 municipalities.

The province contains Palos de la Frontera, and Moguer, where Christopher Columbus sailed out of on his first voyage in 1492, and shares the Parque Nacional de Doñana, located mainly in Almonte.

== Municipalities ==
The province has 80 municipalities:

- Alájar
- Aljaraque
- El Almendro
- Almonaster la Real
- Almonte
- Alosno
- Aracena
- Aroche
- Arroyomolinos de León
- Ayamonte
- Beas
- Berrocal
- Bollullos Par del Condado
- Bonares
- Cabezas Rubias
- Cala
- Calañas
- El Campillo
- Campofrío
- Cañaveral de León
- Cartaya
- Castaño del Robledo
- El Cerro de Andévalo
- Chucena
- Corteconcepción
- Cortegana
- Cortelazor
- Cumbres de Enmedio
- Cumbres de San Bartolomé
- Cumbres Mayores
- Encinasola
- Escacena del Campo
- Fuenteheridos
- Galaroza
- Gibraleón
- La Granada de Río-Tinto
- El Granado
- Higuera de la Sierra
- Hinojales
- Hinojos
- Huelva
- Isla Cristina
- Jabugo
- Lepe
- Linares de la Sierra
- Lucena del Puerto
- Manzanilla
- Los Marines
- Minas de Riotinto
- Moguer
- La Nava
- Nerva
- Niebla
- La Palma del Condado
- Palos de la Frontera
- Paterna del Campo
- Paymogo
- Puebla de Guzmán
- Puerto Moral
- Punta Umbría
- Rociana del Condado
- Rosal de la Frontera
- San Bartolomé de la Torre
- San Juan del Puerto
- Sanlúcar de Guadiana
- San Silvestre de Guzmán
- Santa Ana la Real
- Santa Bárbara de Casa
- Santa Olalla del Cala
- Trigueros
- Valdelarco
- Valverde del Camino
- Villablanca
- Villalba del Alcor
- Villanueva de las Cruces
- Villanueva de los Castillejos
- Villarrasa
- Zalamea la Real
- La Zarza-Perrunal
- Zufre

== Demographics ==
As of 2025, the population is 538,789, of which 49.6% are male, and 50.4% are female. Minors make up 17.1% of the population, and seniors make up 18.5%.

Historical population

| Year | Pop. | ±% |
|---|---|---|
| 1842 | 134,818 | — |
| 1857 | 174,391 | +29.4% |
| 1877 | 209,194 | +20.0% |
| 1887 | 240,067 | +14.8% |
| 1900 | 258,143 | +7.5% |
| 1910 | 295,898 | +14.6% |
| 1920 | 331,527 | +12.0% |
| 1930 | 355,441 | +7.2% |
| 1940 | 375,180 | +5.6% |

| Year | Pop. | ±% |
|---|---|---|
| 1950 | 369,722 | −1.5% |
| 1960 | 404,517 | +9.4% |
| 1970 | 403,405 | −0.3% |
| 1981 | 418,584 | +3.8% |
| 1991 | 443,476 | +5.9% |
| 2001 | 462,579 | +4.3% |
| 2011 | 519,895 | +12.4% |
| 2021 | 527,254 | +1.4% |

Source: INE

=== Immigration ===
As of 2025, immigrants make up 13.1% of the population. The 5 largest foreign countries of birth are Morocco, Romania, Colombia, Portugal, and Mali.

== Economy ==
The economy is based on agriculture and mining. The famous Rio Tinto mines have been worked since before 1000 BC, and were the major source of copper for the Roman Empire. As an indication of the scope of ancient mining, sixteen million tons of Roman slag have been identified at the Roman mines. The Rio Tinto Company Limited resumed large-scale mining in 1873; the district is the namesake of the Rio Tinto Group.

In the 21st century, municipalities such as Moguer, Palos de la Frontera, and Lepe, have witnessed the development of intensive water-demanding strawberry farming, which has elicited attention on the basis of alleged mispractices and abuses regarding the labor conditions of foreign workers and the ecocidal depletion of water resources in Doñana.

=== Tourism ===
The delayed tourist development of the province has allowed better city planning than in other regions on the Spanish coast. The nuclei of Islantilla and Isla Canela are an example of this attempt to plan in a more coherent form. Although in a smaller scale in comparison to other regions, urban pressure continues. Previous developments that had little planning until recent time are El Rompido, El Portil, Mazagón and Matalascañas (Torre de la Higuera).

Although Punta Umbría had its beginnings like pedanía de Cartaya, after the democratization of summer tourism, it began its urban development for its proximity to the capital and its location on the beach. Present development would not endure without tourist activity and its vacation housing. Other tourist areas are Nuevo Umbría, Nuevo Portil, Punta del Moral, La Antilla and Urbasur. The marismas de Isla Cristina, next to the towns of Ayamonte and Isla Cristina, are a protected nature reserve. In the mountain town of Almonaster la Real, the Visigothic-mosque church built in the first decades of the 10th century and whose mihrab is one of the oldest in Spain is one important turistic point.

Of note is Huelva's recent classification of "rural tourism" for its interior mountain range.

== Green electricity ==
Huelva has 388 megawatts (MW) of wind power, 68 MW biomass power, and 66 MW of solar power. A 220 kilovolt transmission line has been constructed to send power to the main grid as well as improving connections between Spain and Portugal.

== See also ==
- Cerro Colorado mining deposit
- Chemical Park of Huelva
- List of municipalities in Huelva
- Labour inspectorate
- Port of Isla Cristina
- Tharsis-La Zarza mining basin
- Santa María La Bella Convent
- Peña del Hierro mine
