= Fregenal de la Sierra =

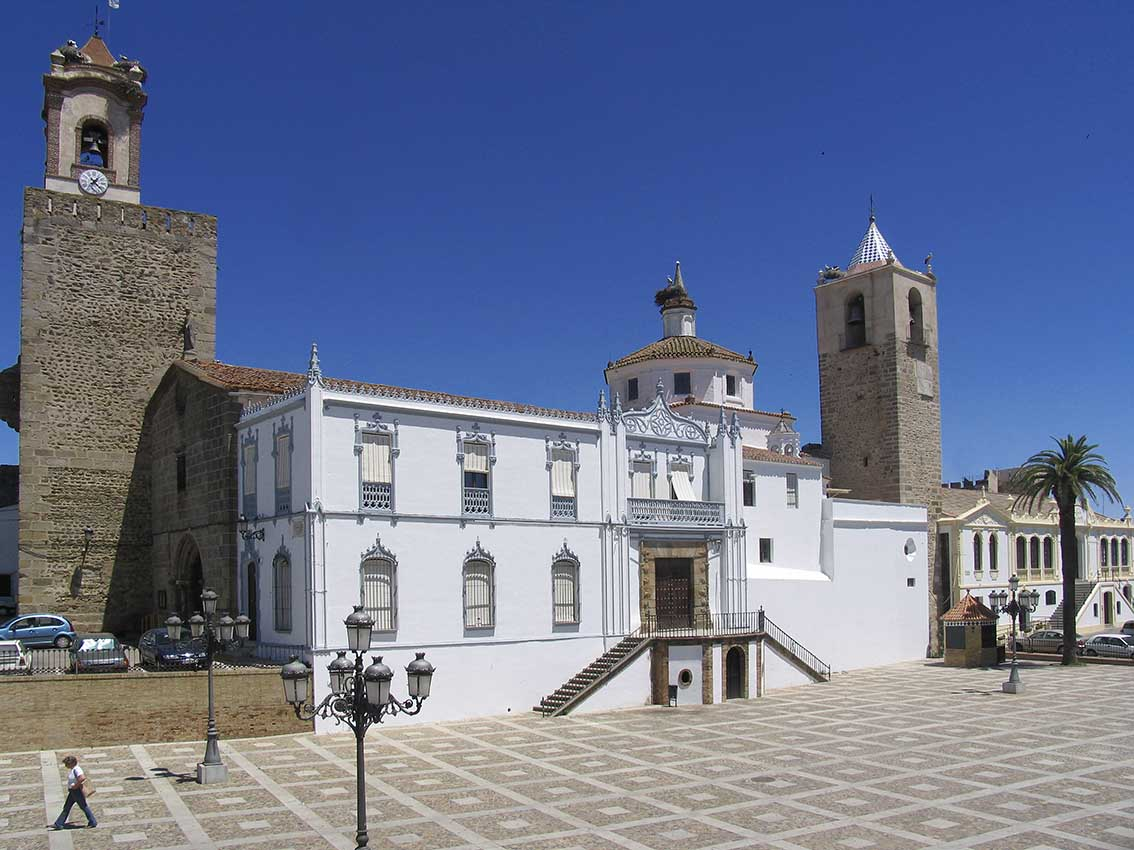
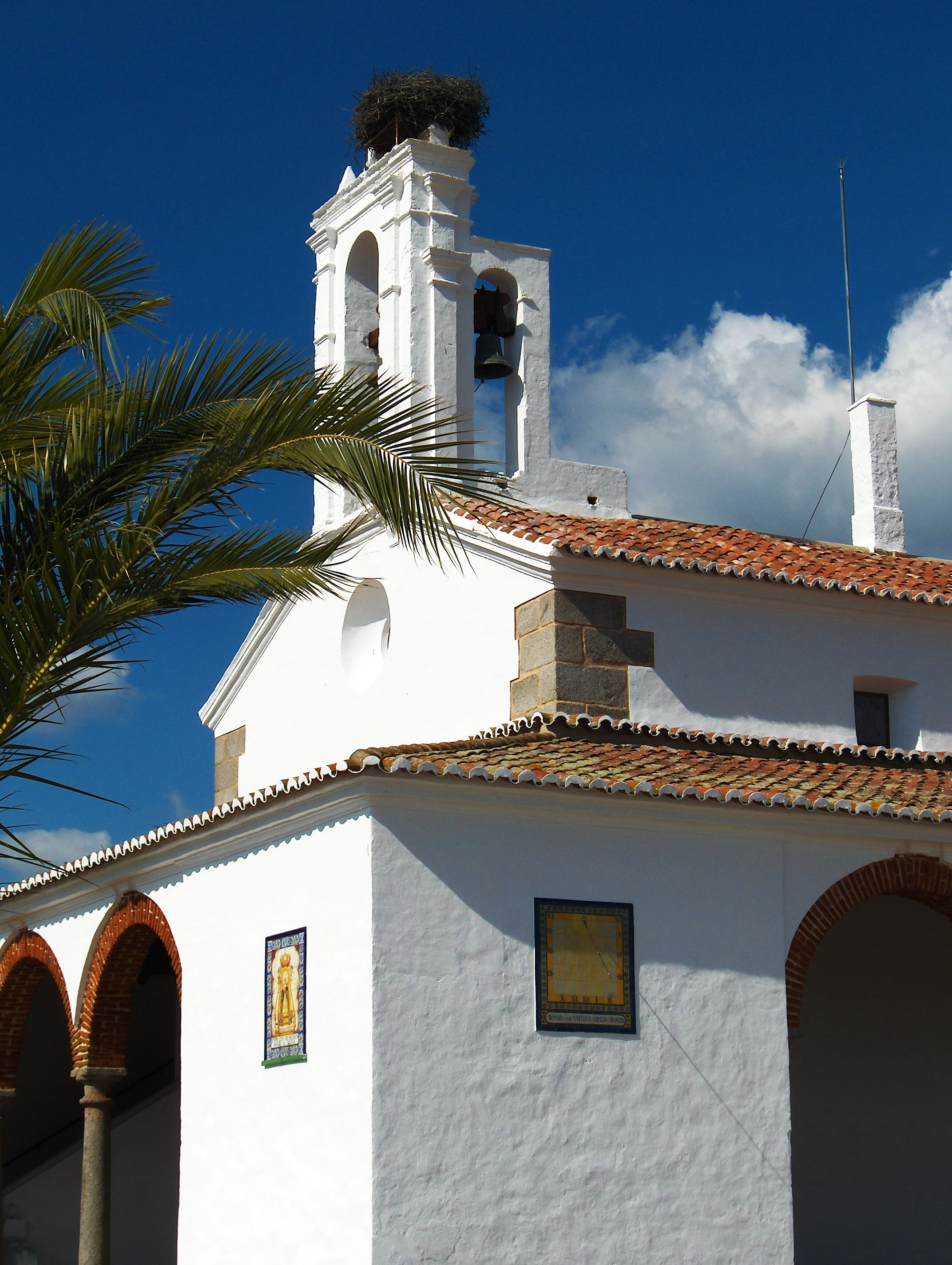
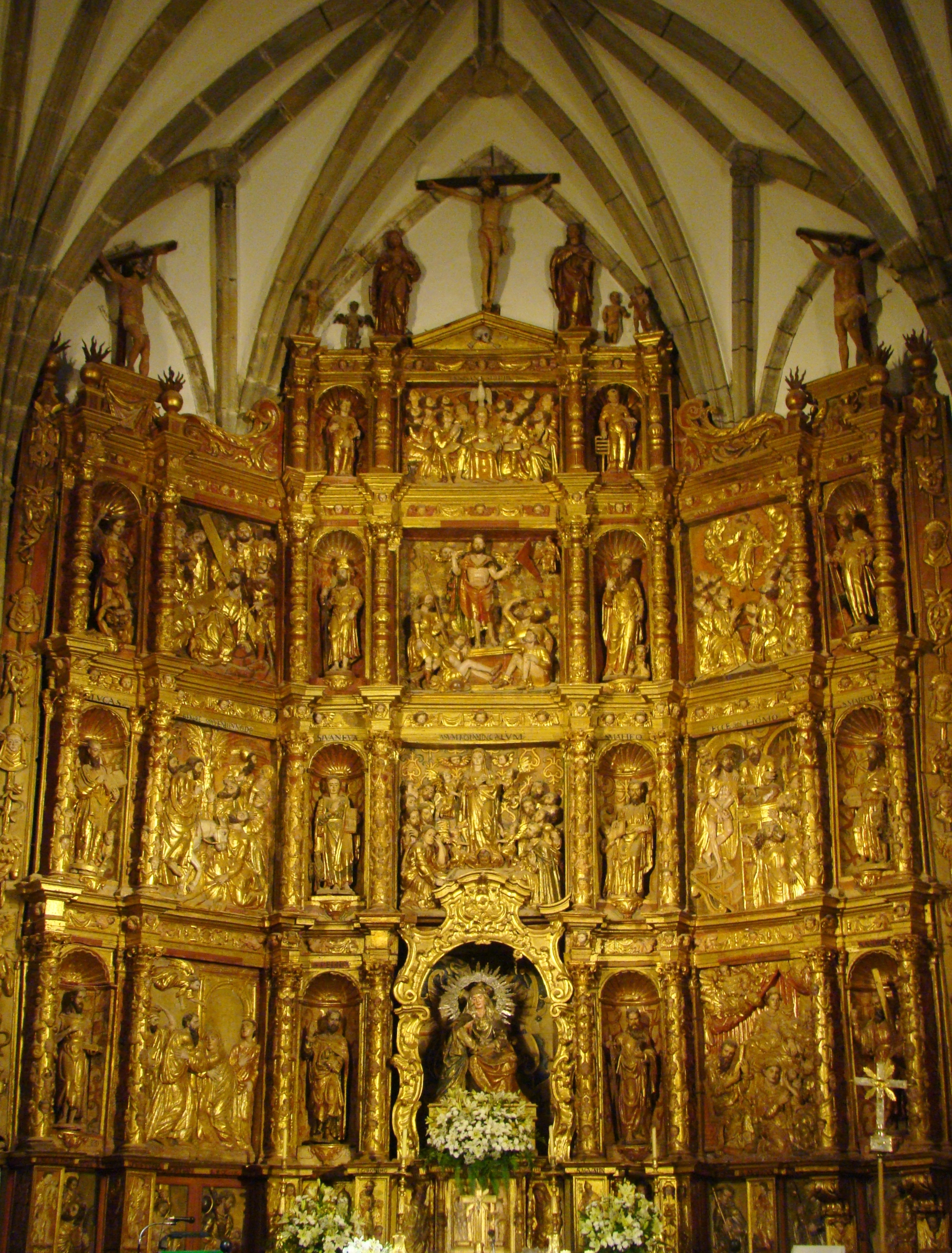
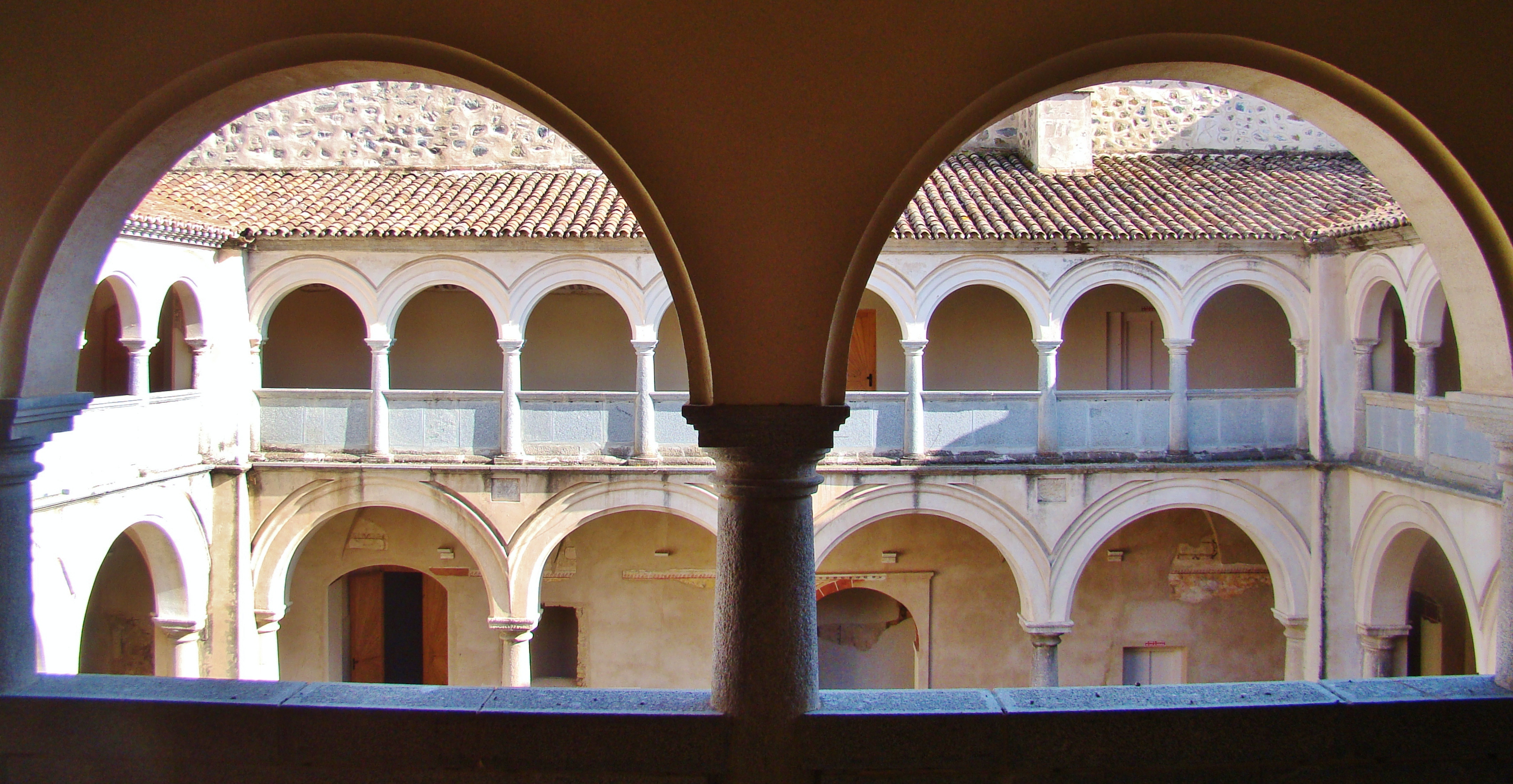
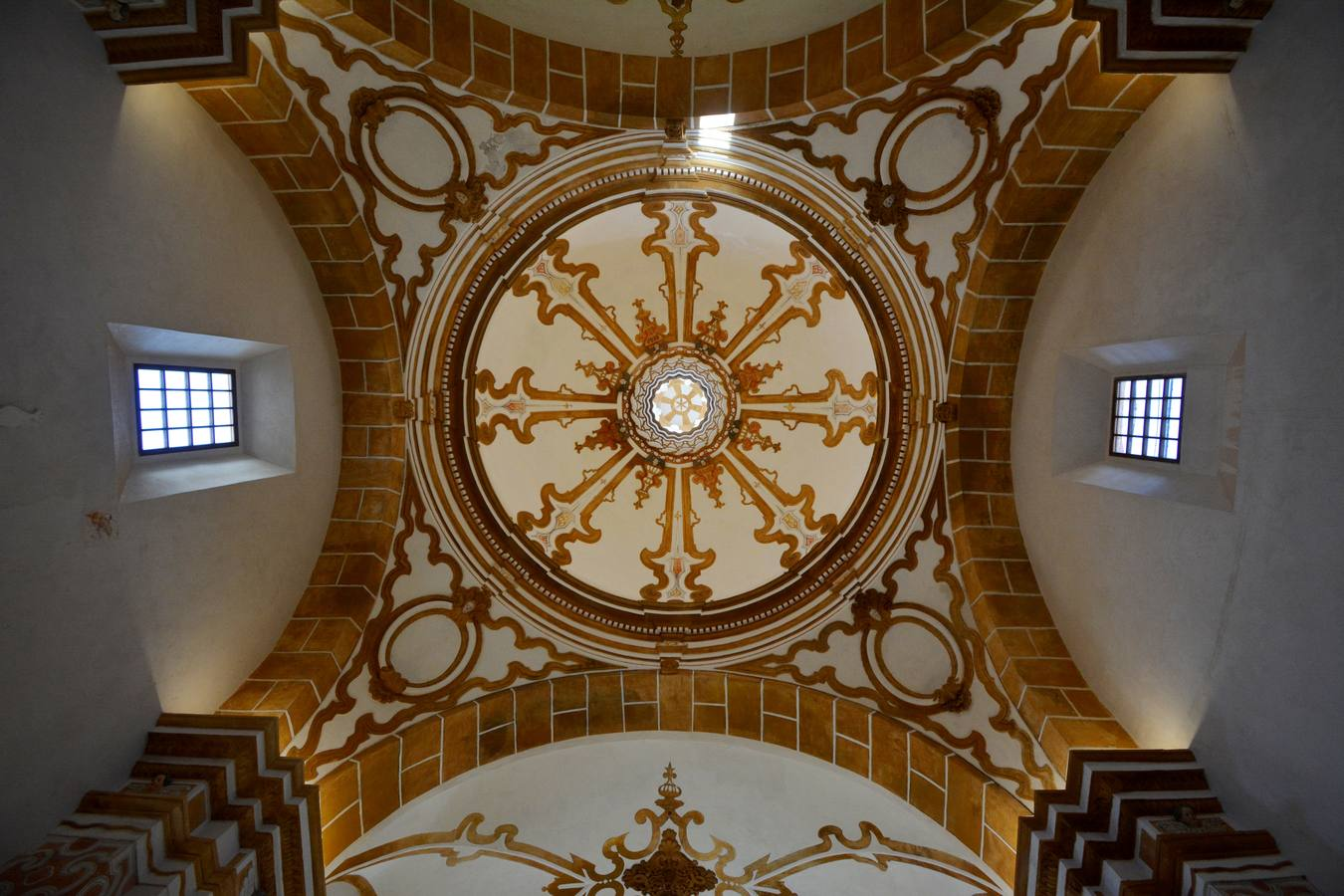
- Paseo de la Constitución Sanctuary of Our Lady Santa María de los Remedios Altarpiece of Santa Ana Cloister of San Francisco Dome of San Ildefonso de los Jesuitas

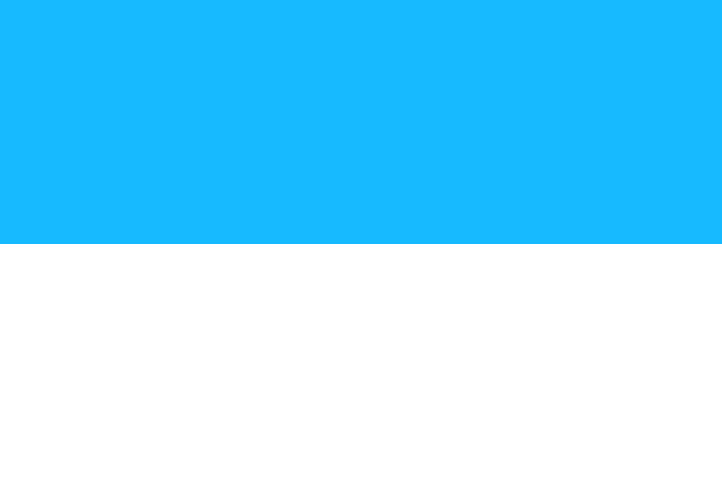
- Flag Coat of arms
- Motto(s): Litteris armata et armis decorata (English: ‘Armed by letters and adorned by arms’)
- Location of Fregenal de la Sierra within Extremadura Fregenal de la Sierra (Spain)
- Coordinates: 38°10′00″N 6°39′00″W
- Country: Spain
- Autonomous community: Extremadura
- Province: Badajoz
- Comarca: Sierra Suroeste
- Judicial district: Fregenal de la Sierra
- Founded: 1253–1283

Government
  - Mayor: María Agustina Rodríguez Martínez (PP-Extremadura)
  - Mayor since: 2015

Area
  - Total: 236.7 km^{2} (91.4 sq mi)
- Elevation: 572 m (1,877 ft)

Population (2024)
  - Total: 4,743
  - Density: 20.04/km^{2} (51.90/sq mi)
- Demonym: Frexnense
- Time zone: UTC+1 (CET)
  - Summer (DST): UTC+2 (CEST)
- Postal code: 06340
- Patron saint: Christ of Charity (historical), Saint Matthew (unofficial)
- Patroness: Virgin of Los Remedios
- Twin towns: Barrancos (Portugal); Taurisano (Italy)
- Website: Official website

Fregenal de la Sierra (originally Frexnal or Frexenal) is a municipality and town in Spain, located in the Province of Badajoz, in the autonomous community of Extremadura. It is situated in the northwestern quadrant of Sierra Morena, at an elevation of approximately 572 meters above sea level.

Due to its geographical position, the town occupies a historically significant crossroads. Its founding is tied to a conflict between the Council of Seville, which received the territory through a Royal Privilege from Alfonso X in 1253, and the knights of the Order of the Temple, who are credited with constructing the Castle of Fregenal, donated to the order in 1283 by the same monarch. From 1312, the town of Frexenal was reintegrated into the territories of the Kingdom of Seville, while also forming part of the Diocese of Badajoz. In 1833, after 585 years, the Royal Decree of 30 November abolished the Kingdom of Seville, creating the modern provinces of Seville, Huelva, and Cádiz, and incorporating Fregenal into the Province of Badajoz.

On 5 February 1873, Amadeo I of Spain granted Fregenal the honorary title of city, at the proposal of the Minister of the Interior, Manuel Ruiz Zorrilla, in agreement with the Council of Ministers. Given its rich heritage, as evidenced by its historical and artistic ensemble declared a Cultural Interest Asset in 1991, the archaeological site of Nertobriga Concordia Iulia similarly designated in 2013, the designation in 2020 of the menhirs of the Ardila River basin, and the Chile Nitrate billboard located near its train station in 2023, as well as the inclusion in 2023 of the Medieval hermitage of San Miguel de los Fresnos in the Inventory of Historical and Cultural Heritage of Extremadura, it is regarded as one of the most significant emerging cultural and tourist destinations in the Province of Badajoz.

Reflecting its popular traditions, a blend of Baetic, Andalusian, and Extremaduran folklore, Fregenal is a major cultural hub in the southwestern Iberian Peninsula. Notable among the heritage of the Frexnenses is the Dance and Festival of the Virgin of Health, declared an Asset of Cultural Interest in the category of Intangible Heritage in 2017 by the Government of Extremadura. This folklore, combined with works created in honor of the town's patroness, Virgin of Los Remedios, is preserved by cultural institutions such as the Coral Frexnense or the Los Jateros Folk Group, which showcase them annually alongside traditions from around the world at the International Sierra Festival, declared a Festival of National Tourist Interest in 2018.

Among its most illustrious figures are Benito Arias Montano, a humanist, Hebraist, biologist, and polyglot writer who participated in the Council of Trent, contributed to the compilation of the Plantin Polyglot, and was responsible for cataloging and organizing the works in the Library of the Monastery of San Lorenzo de El Escorial, one of the largest in Christendom; Juan Bravo Murillo, President of the Council of Ministers during the reign of Isabella II of Spain, who served in various moderate governments, oversaw the construction of the Canal de Isabel II, introduced the metric system in Spain, approved the Canary Islands Free Ports Law, and reformed and established the foundations of the Spanish treasury; Rodrigo Sánchez-Arjona y Sánchez-Arjona, who established the first rural private telephone line in Spain, between his home in Fregenal and a property called Las Mimbres; and Eugenio Hermoso, a painter of the Royal Academy of Fine Arts of San Fernando, who won the Medal of Honor at the National Exhibition of Fine Arts in 1948 with his paintings Altar and Las Siembras, considered one of the most important painters of Extremadura.

== Symbols ==
=== Coat of arms ===
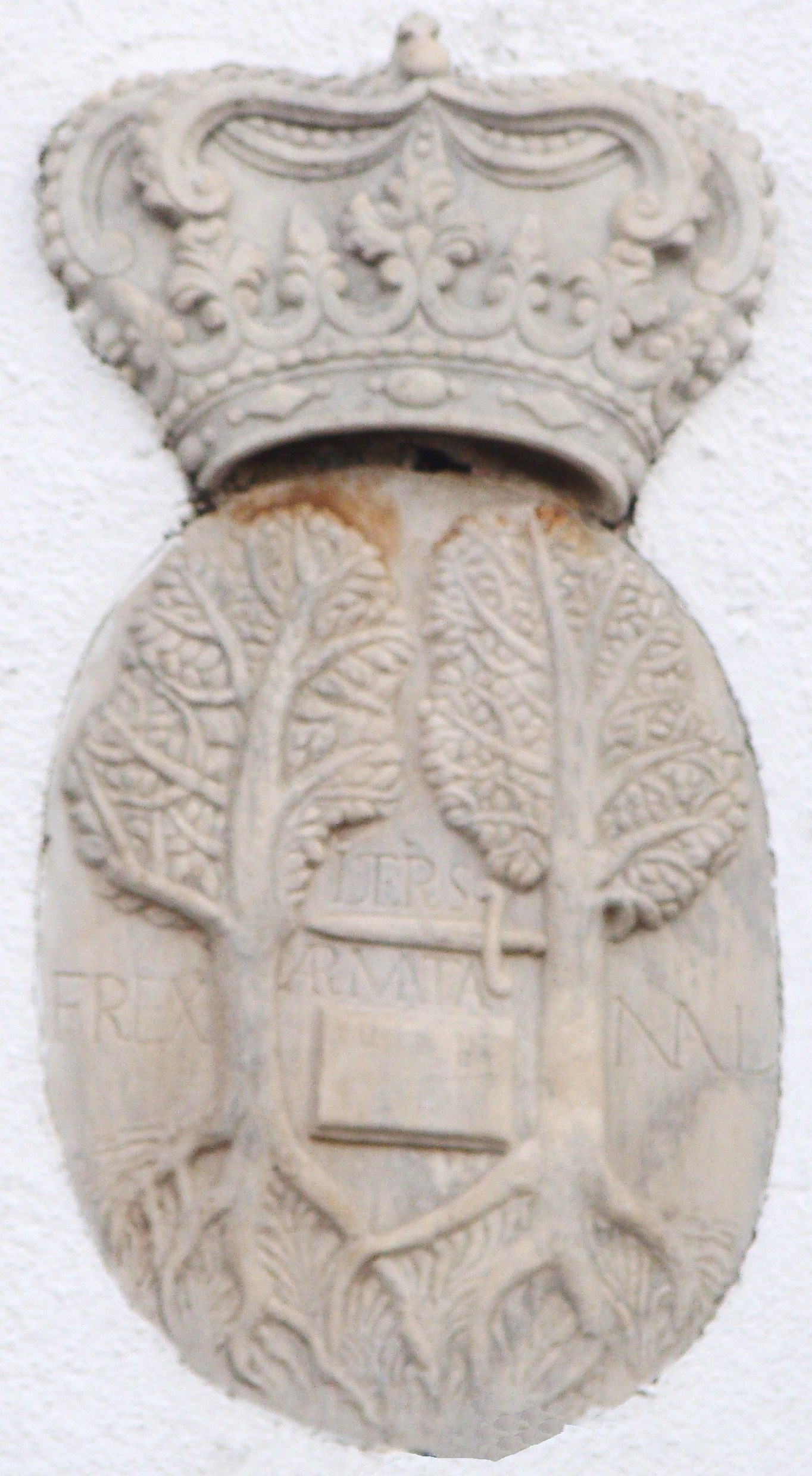
Coat of arms of Fregenal on the facade of the Town Hall

The coat of arms of Fregenal de la Sierra consists, in its basic form, of a single circular quarter. A red field is typically added around it. It is crowned with a royal crown, though modifications have occurred over time (during the Second Spanish Republic, a mural crown was used).

Within the quarter, two ash trees, the city's emblematic tree, are depicted. As can be inferred, the town's name refers to this tree, considered sacred by the Order of the Temple, which repopulated the area.

Flanking the ash trees is a book crossed by a sword. Inside the book, written in Latin, is the town's motto: Litteris Armata et Armis Decorata ('Armed by letters and adorned by arms').

=== Flag ===
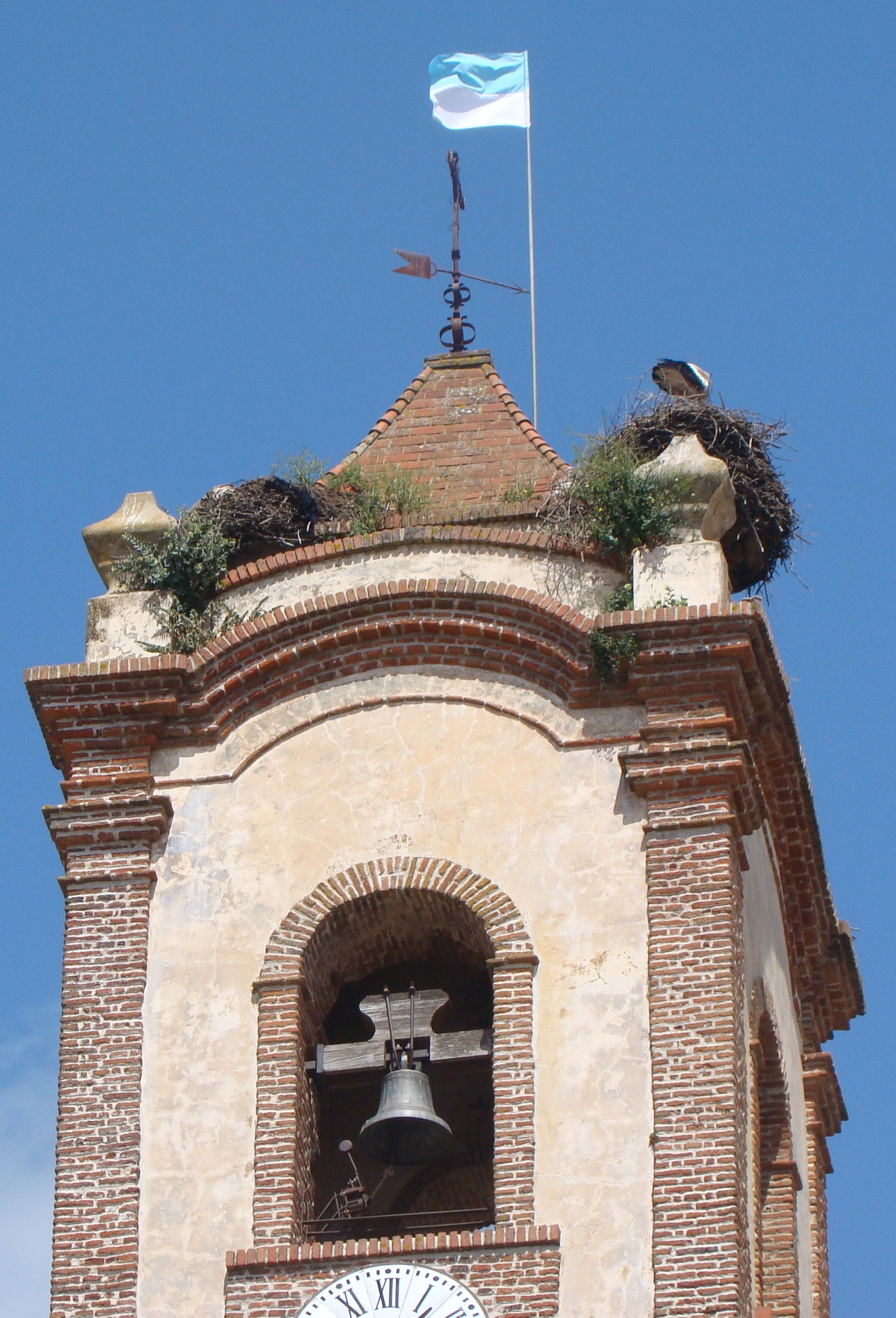
Flag of the Frexnenses on the Keep of the Castle of Fregenal

The Town Hall of Fregenal de la Sierra has never officially issued a regulation establishing the design of a flag for the town. However, the banner of the town's patroness, the Virgin of Los Remedios, has been adopted by the Frexnenses as a symbol and flag representing them.

The patroness's banner is permanently hoisted on the keep of the Templar Castle of Fregenal de la Sierra. It is periodically replaced, usually coinciding with the patronal festivals in honor of the Virgin of Los Remedios.

The flag consists of two horizontal stripes. The upper stripe is blue, and the lower stripe is white.

== Geography ==
Municipal map of the Province of Badajoz with its judicial districts, including the Judicial district of Fregenal de la Sierra

Located within the Sierra Suroeste comarca, Fregenal de la Sierra is 94 kilometers from the provincial capital. The municipal territory is traversed by the following roads:

- National Road N-435, between km 89 and 95, connecting Badajoz with Huelva
- Regional Road EX-101, leading to Valverde de Burguillos and Zafra
- Regional Road EX-201, leading to Segura de León
- Local Road BA-160, connecting Valencia del Ventoso and Bodonal de la Sierra

The municipal terrain is characterized by the transition between the Extremaduran plain and the initial elevations of Sierra Morena, with numerous meadows standing out. The Ardila River marks the northern and northeastern boundary with Burguillos del Cerro and Valencia del Ventoso, while the Parrilla stream defines the western boundary with Jerez de los Caballeros. Other small streams and ravines wind through the hills and sierras. The altitude ranges from 700 meters in the west, at the border with Higuera la Real, to 300 meters along the banks of the Ardila River. The town itself is situated at 572 meters above sea level.

== History ==
=== Ancient age ===
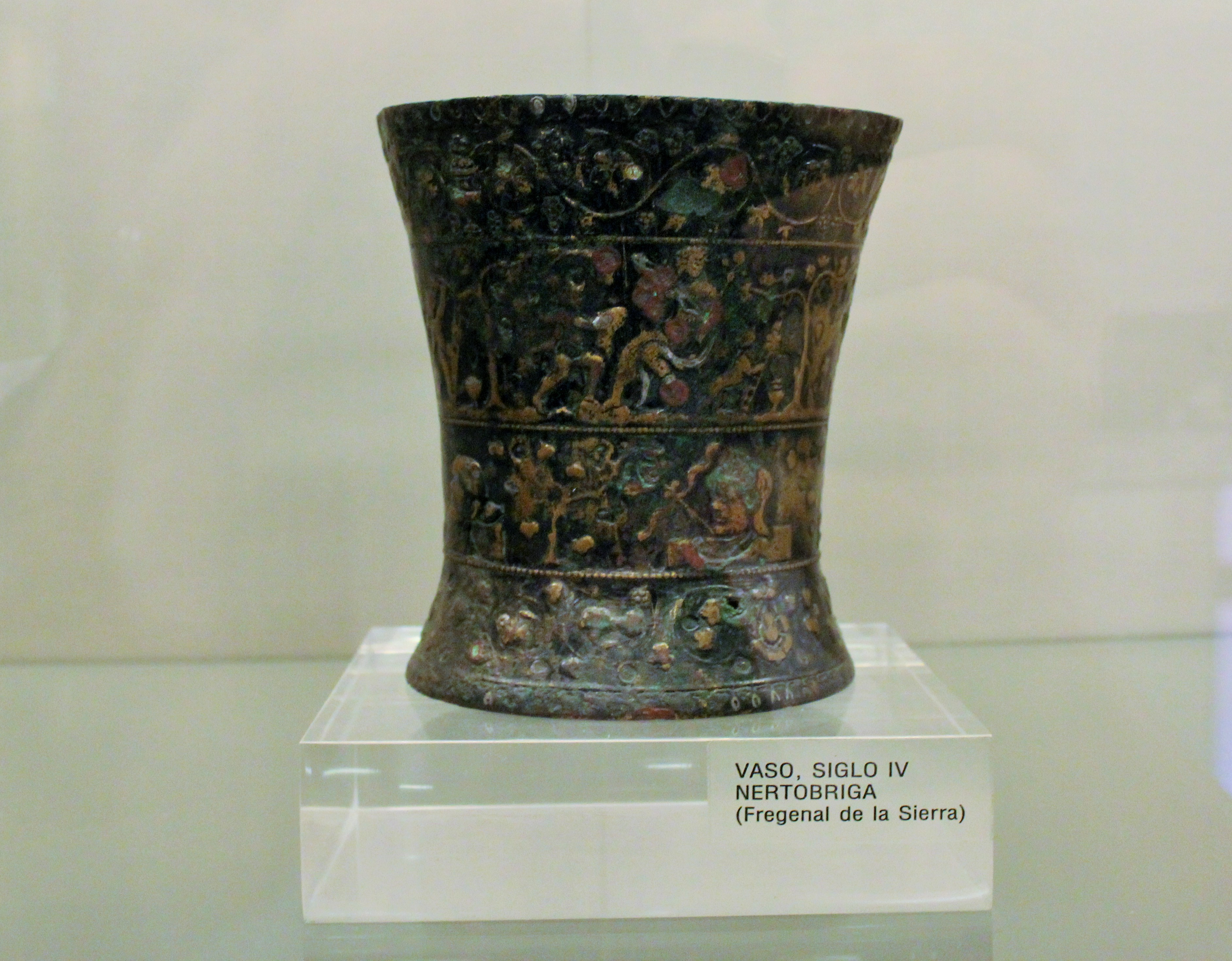
Decorated bronze calathus from Nertóbriga (4th century, Archaeological Museum of Badajoz)

Archaeological sites within the current municipal boundaries of Fregenal de la Sierra date back to the Chalcolithic. Among the menhirs of the Ardila River basin, which forms a natural border with the municipality of Valencia del Ventoso, notable examples include La Pepina, La Palanca del Moro, and Los Tres Términos. All were declared Assets of Cultural Interest in March 2020.

The origins of the settlement of Fregenal de la Sierra are linked to the vicinity of the current urban center, where the ruins of the Celtic castrum of Nertobriga or Nerkobrika are located, currently under ongoing excavation and research. Founded during the Second Iron Age, it was part of the Baeturia Céltica and is considered the capital of the Celtic Baeturics. The primary historical reference to Nerkobrika is provided by Polybius, who describes its conquest by assault in 152 BC by the praetor Marcus. Following the Roman conquest, the Celtic oppidum was replaced by a Roman city, named Nertobriga Concordia Iulia. Its foundation, likely as a foederata, dates back to the 2nd century BC. Later, at the end of the 1st century BC, it was granted the status of municipium, a deductio shared with most Celtic cities of the Baeturia and the southwestern Iberian Peninsula. The city was part of the Hispania Ulterior province during the first two centuries BC and was later administratively integrated into the Baetica, where it remained for over seven centuries until the beginning of the Andalusian period.

Its strategic importance was also tied to the establishment of an episcopal see in the city with the spread of Christianity. According to tradition, Saint Theopompus and Saint Eutropius were bishops of Nertóbriga. Theopompus was one of the first bishops to occupy the episcopal see of Nertóbriga during the 3rd century. He was martyred under the reign of Diocletian, with Dacian as governor, being beheaded after baptizing the magician Theonas as Synesius. The Roman Martyrology states that the saint's martyrdom occurred in the Nertóbriga of the Tarraconensis: "thus God chose to honor both Roman Nertóbrigas, Fregenal having an illustrious Prelate and Almuña or Ricla of Aragon as the place of his martyrdom." Eutropius held the see of Nertóbriga in the 5th century, his tenure marked by his strong opposition to the heresy of the Aviti. To resolve his doubts about the Aviti, he corresponded with Augustine of Hippo and Saint Jerome, who supported his thesis of heresy, leading to the condemnation of the monks practicing it. His death is dated 17 February 420. The see of Nertóbriga was suppressed before the reign of Wamba, so there were no further bishops of Nertóbriga after the 7th century.

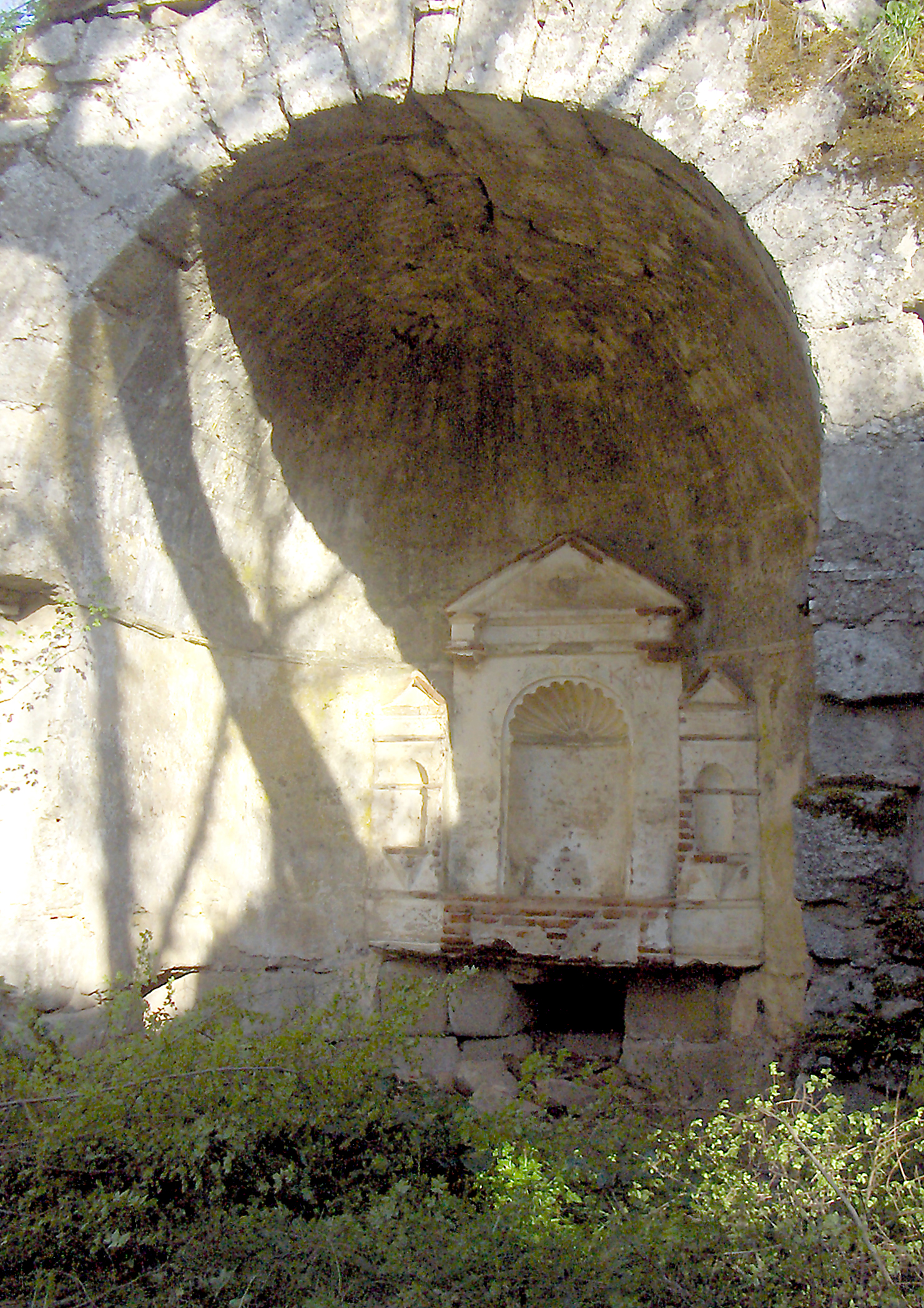
Visigothic apse of the church of the former Monastery of San Miguel de los Fresnos

Recent excavations shed light on the possible Visigothic past of the site. The discovery of remains that may have been a Visigothic watchtower, as well as a significant Muslim necropolis, leads researchers to assert that the site was forcibly taken with the arrival of the new religion. The only references made by Christians to this city are to the name Castillo de Valera, which was donated by Alfonso X to the Knights Templar.

Equally noteworthy are the Visigothic remains of the Monastery of San Miguel de los Fresnos, located east of Fregenal. The construction of its apse, clearly of Visigothic tradition, indicates the site's antiquity. Tradition holds that the monastery was founded by the saints Honorius and Exuperantius, who healed the sick with water from a nearby spring. Specifically, Saint Exuperantius was a Benedictine monk of Italian origin, born around 490. At the request of Sanctina, wife of the Ostrogothic king Theodoric, he was sent to found monasteries in Spain with companions Euiemio, Venancio, and Adelfio. He first stayed in Pamplona and later moved to the Baetica, specifically to Nertóbriga, around 572, as stated by Marco Máximo in 612. His veneration is based on his evangelizing work in Spain during the 6th century, particularly the founding of this monastery alongside his disciple Honorius. His death is dated 26 May 578.

Regarding the vanished monastery, the preserved remains include the 7th-century apse, framed by a horseshoe arch leading to a quarter-sphere vault that housed the altar dedicated to Saint Michael, whose image is preserved in the National Art Museum of Catalonia. The nave with pointed arches dates to the 14th and 15th centuries, and the walls and pointed arch serving as the entrance remain. Due to its high historical and architectural value, the hermitage has been included in the Inventory of Historical and Cultural Heritage of Extremadura.

=== Middle Ages ===
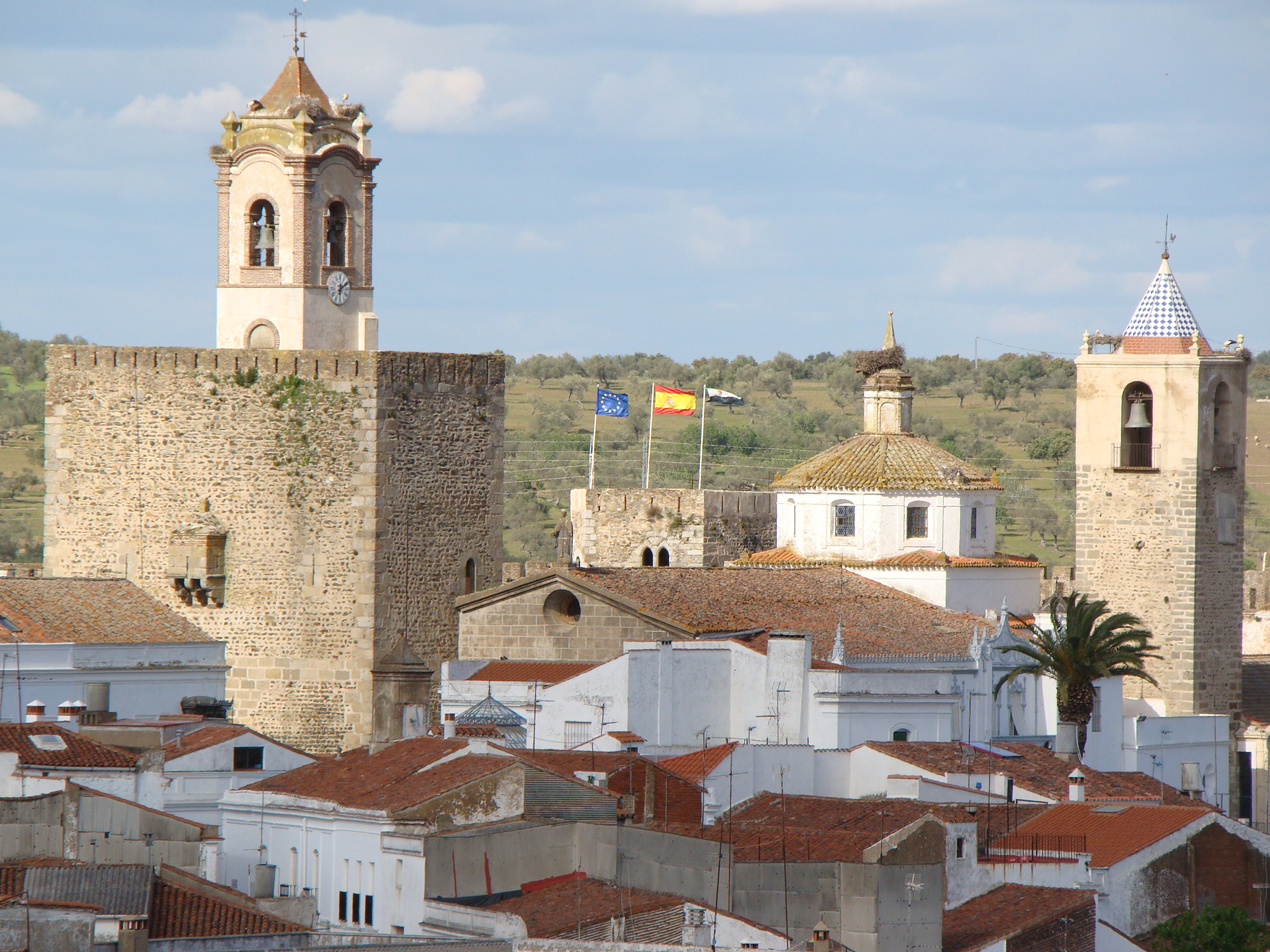
View of the Castle of Fregenal de la Sierra and the Church of Santa María de la Plaza

The conquest of Fregenal from the Hispano-Muslims by Ferdinand III of Castile, with the aid of the Order of the Temple, lies between legend and history. The first historical mention of Fregenal appears in 1253, when the town was incorporated into the domains of the Kingdom of Seville through a Royal Privilege from Alfonso X "The Wise". Regarding this point, there is a conflict in historical sources, with some asserting that Fregenal was one of the main castles in the defensive line of Seville's northern sierra, while others claim the castle did not exist until its construction by the Templars.

Thus, the construction date of the Castle of Fregenal is uncertain according to these sources but is understood to have occurred sometime between 1253 and 1283. The latter date stems from the Royal Privilege of Alfonso X, which granted the Templars the territories where they had previously built the castle of Fregenal. The fortress's construction is thus attributed to the knights who previously controlled the Castle of Valera, seizing this land from the Seville Council, which could not maintain control due to pressure from the open military front with the Muslims. Alongside Fregenal, the Order also received the neighboring cities of Jerez de los Caballeros and Ribera del Fresno, making it the largest Templar encomienda in Castilian territory.

The Order of the Temple, which can thus be considered the founder of the city, remained in the area until 1308. The following year, the castle and possessions of Fregenal passed to Gonzalo Sánchez de Troncones for services rendered to King Ferdinand IV of Castile during the Siege of Algeciras. The lordship of Fregenal under Troncones lasted from 1309 to 1312, when Fregenal was reintegrated into the Kingdom of Seville after the fortress was taken by troops sent by the Seville Council. Except for brief periods in the 16th century, the town remained primarily under the authority of the Guadalquivir capital. Various military conflicts unfolded throughout the 15th century, directly affecting Fregenal and its population, particularly the noble revolts against the ascension of Isabella the Catholic. Its strategic position near the border with the neighboring Kingdom of Portugal placed it in the sights of both Portuguese and Castilians. The Catholic Monarchs recognized its privileged location, making the fortress a key center for military organization against Portugal. On one occasion, this led King Ferdinand II of Aragon to travel to Fregenal to lead the campaign alongside the master of the Order of Santiago, Alonso de Cárdenas. Similarly, the stay of the Catholic Monarchs' eldest daughter, Infanta Isabella of Aragon, at the Fregenal castle during the Easter of 1480 to 1481 is noteworthy, as she traveled to Portugal to marry Afonso of Portugal, becoming the heir to the Portuguese crown.

=== Early modern period ===
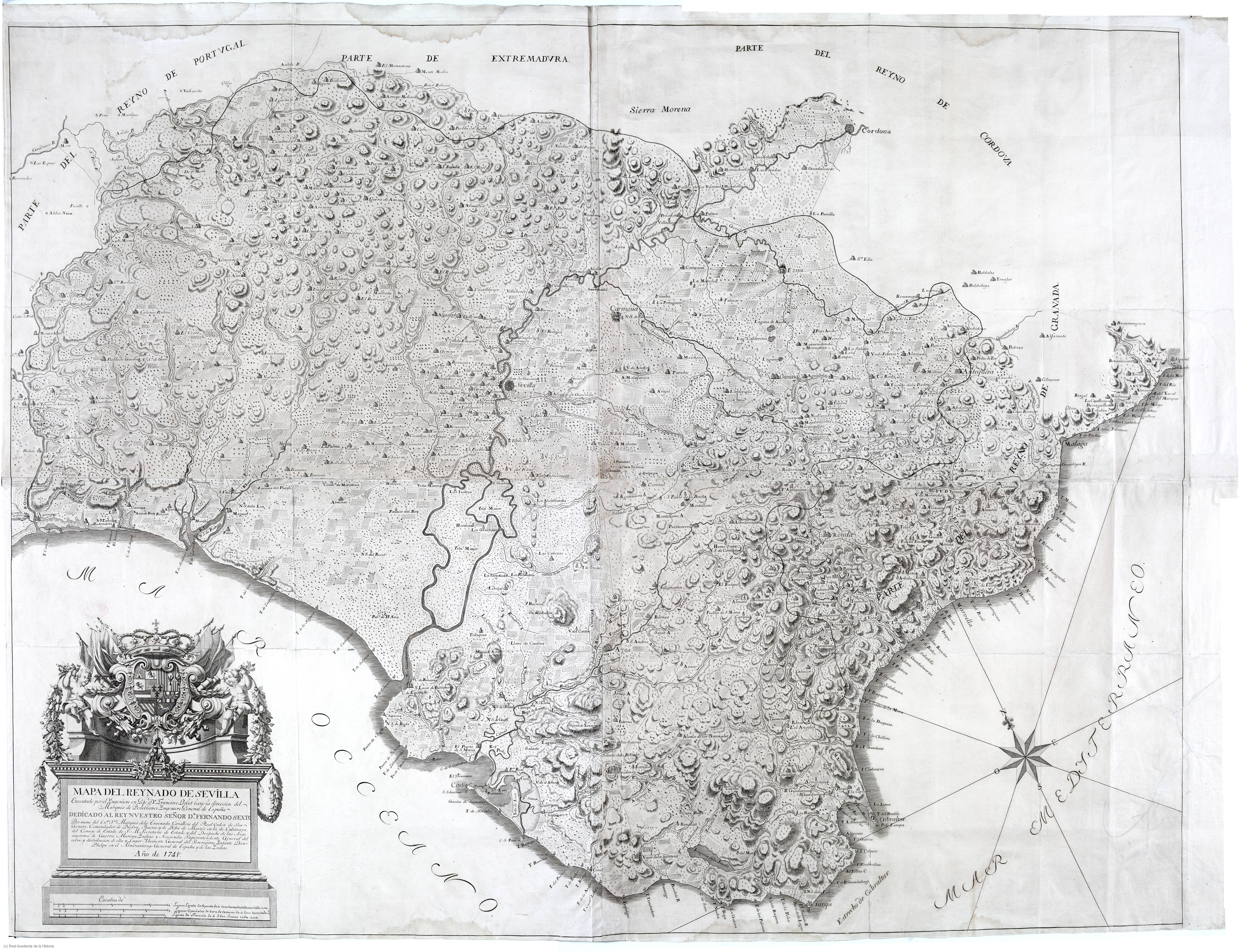
Map of the Kingdom of Seville, of which Fregenal was part, except for some periods, from 1253 to 1833

In the 15th century, its jurisdiction extended to three localities: Higuera, Bodonal, and Marotera. The tripartite jurisdictional situation in Fregenal was peculiar, as it spiritually belonged to the Diocese of Badajoz, while also being an encomienda of the Order of Saint John of Jerusalem, which inherited some of the Templars' assets after their dissolution. Thus, it was spiritually tied to Badajoz, fiscally to the Order of Saint John, and temporally to the Seville Council.

Fregenal's contribution to the conquest and colonization of the Americas was numerically significant, with 105 individuals departing for the Indies, according to Navarro del Castillo. Among the most notable are Alonso Rodríguez Santos and Benito Arias Montano. Rodríguez Santos served as mayor of Fregenal for the noble estate and was married to María Martínez, sister of the Frexnense humanist Benito Arias Montano. From this marriage were born their sons Juan and Benito, with whom he traveled to Venezuela in 1592 after the death of their mother. He solidified his position in Caracas through his second marriage in 1607 to Melchora de Vera e Ibargoyen, daughter of a prominent local family. From this second marriage descended the lineage of Simón Bolívar, considered the national liberator. In Caracas, Rodríguez Santos alternated his role as a prominent merchant with various positions in the city council, including chief constable in 1594, general procurator in 1603, and ordinary mayor in 1609, 1612, 1616, 1620, and 1623. He also assumed the role of governor in Venezuelan territory after the death of Tribiño Billames until the arrival of a new governor. Benito Arias Montano, son of the former and nephew of the humanist of the same name, was also born in Fregenal in 1588. His father's position in Caracas enabled him to build a military career in the navy, rising to captain and holding various posts on the Venezuelan coast defending the Araya fortress, and in the Caribbean islands combating piracy and expelling the Dutch from Tortuga and Saint Martin, who were stealing salt from the Unare salt flats. In 1631, Arias Montano was appointed governor of the eastern region of present-day Venezuela, called New Andalusia. From this position, he promoted the founding of the city of San Baltasar de los Arias, now known as Cumanacoa, to serve as a link between Cumaná and the mission towns emerging in the southeastern region where Spanish missionaries were arriving.

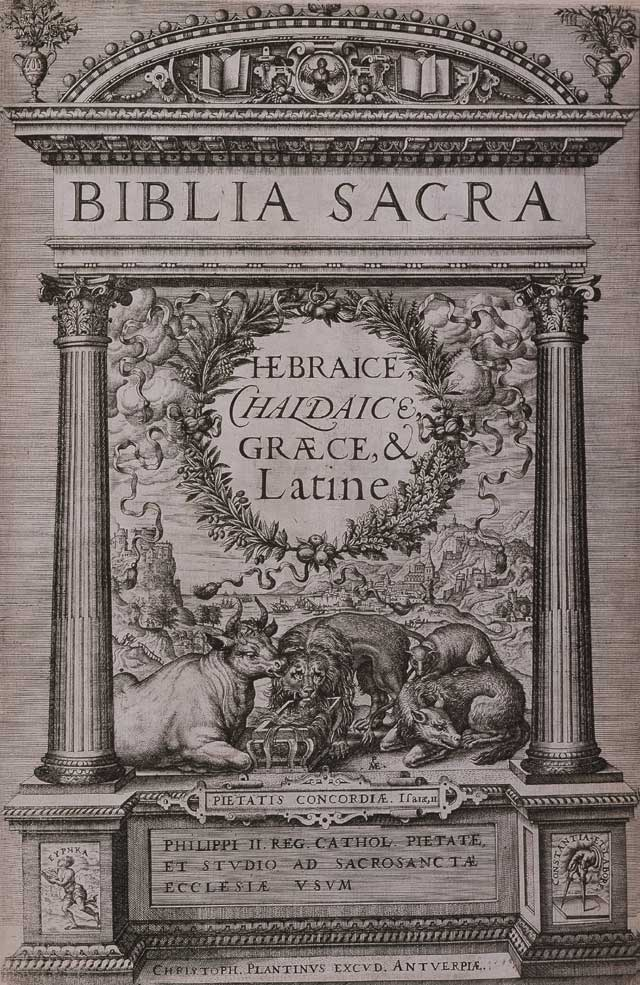
Cover of the Plantin Polyglot (1568–1572), edited by Benito Arias Montano

In the mid-16th century, the spread of Humanism across Europe was largely supported by the religious community of the time. The education available to priests and prelates equipped them with advanced knowledge of Latin, enabling them not only to read the Holy Scriptures but also to study classical sources. This is exemplified by the legacy of the Priestly Brotherhood of Saint Peter, which gathered around sixty clerics settled in the town. At this time, Fregenal had three active parishes, as well as the seat of the ecclesiastical vicariate, which extended its jurisdiction to the towns of Bodonal, Higuera, and Valencia del Ventoso. This educated elite was a key component of Frexnense society for the spread of Humanism in the town, with the clergy of New Christian origin playing a significant role. As in the nearby Zafra, Llerena, or Segura de León, former important Jewish quarters of Lower Extremadura, much of the region's educated clergy came from first- or second-generation New Christian families.

In this climate of expanding classical knowledge, several prominent figures in Fregenal's history emerged, led by the humanist Benito Arias Montano. The first generation of Frexnense humanists was particularly marked by their New Christian status, as seen in the cases of Vasco Díaz Tanco and Francisco Arceo. Vasco Díaz Tanco was a soldier, priest, poet, theologian, playwright, actor, and writer. The Catálogo of Barrera notes that he authored three tragedies, three comedies, three satires, twenty-four plays, and three colloquies, as well as several epistles, with Jardín del alma cristiana being one of his most renowned works of the time. In his life, he traveled across much of Europe and North Africa, fleeing to Portugal in 1524 pursued by the authorities and captured by French corsairs. After being freed, he moved to Valencia and Catalonia. By 1526, he was linked to the Court and attended the wedding of Charles V in Seville. He also witnessed the sack of Rome and was present at the emperor's coronation in Bologna. Upon his return, he settled in Valencia, where he began a career as a printer. In his final years, he moved to Galicia, establishing his press in Orense, balancing roles as editor and writer. Francisco Arceo, born in Fregenal in 1493, was a physician and writer. He studied medicine at the University of Alcalá and worked for several years in the hospitals of the Monastery of Guadalupe, gaining extraordinary fame as a surgeon. Six years before his death, he published De recta curandorum vulnerum ratione (1574), printed in Antwerp by Christophe Plantin through the intervention of Benito Arias Montano. The book achieved widespread circulation across Europe, reprinted in Latin and translated into English, French, German, and Dutch.

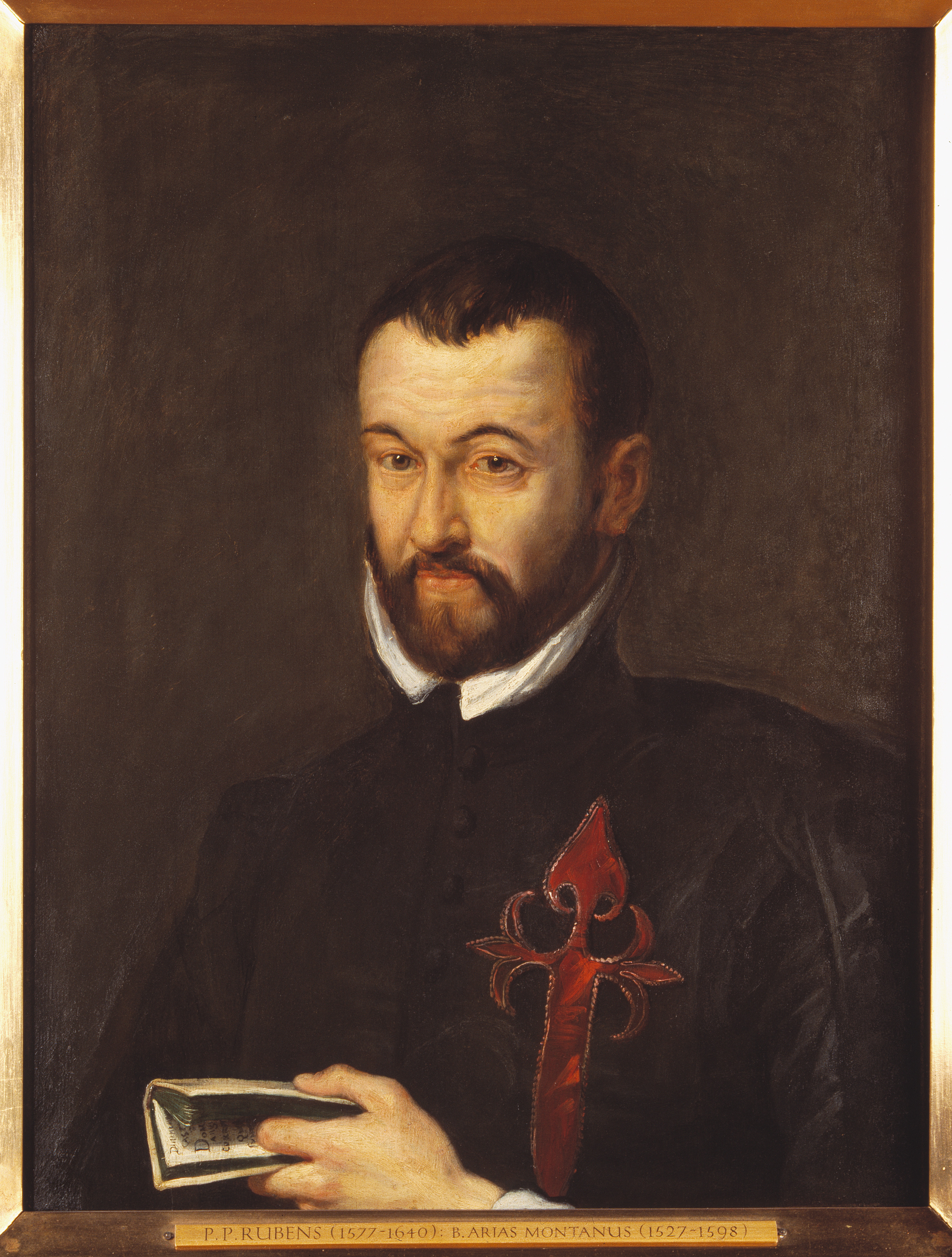
Portrait of Benito Arias Montano attributed to Peter Paul Rubens

In the former Ruda Street of the old town of Frexenal, Benito Arias Montano was born in 1527. A plaque at his birthplace today honors the "Most Wise" son of Fregenal, the most illustrious among the Frexnenses. Although his time in the town was somewhat circumstantial, as he later lived in his beloved Seville, the capital of the kingdom in which Fregenal was located, his roots in a family of New Christians, the Arias, and his birthplace earned him the nickname Montano, by which he is globally known. He began his studies at the University of Seville, where he developed an interest in physical and medical sciences, and especially in poetry, philosophy, linguistics, and theology. He later moved to the University of Alcalá, where he expanded his knowledge in medicine, theology, philosophy, classical languages (Latin and Greek), and Semitic languages (Arabic, Hebrew, and Syriac). After being ordained a priest, he retired to the nearby mountain town of Alájar.

His proximity to Martín Pérez de Ayala, his professor at Alcalá and Bishop of Segovia, allowed him to travel in 1562 to the Spanish territories in Flanders to participate in the Council of Trent, where he delivered speeches on divorce and communion under both species. Upon returning to Spain, his monarch Philip II appointed him chaplain in 1566, also entrusting him with his magnum opus, the Plantin Polyglot, printed by Christophe Plantin. This monumental work marked a turning point in his thinking, particularly his perspective on Spanish policy in Flanders, as it was a project prepared by a group of Flemish and French intellectuals, mostly associated with the Familia Caritatis, founded around 1540 by the German mystic Hendrik Nicholis or Niclaes. The innovations introduced compared to the Complutensian Polyglot Bible and, more significantly, the Vulgate, raised suspicions from the Inquisition and were denounced by León de Castro, though the work was ultimately published in Antwerp in 1572. The compilation included the sacred text in Hebrew, Greek, Aramaic, and Latin.

Back in Spain, he was tasked with cataloging the works of the newly established Library of the Royal Monastery of El Escorial, one of the largest in Christendom and the most significant in the world for collecting Arabic texts. He maintained his relationship with Christophe Plantin, collaborating on further projects. After several years, he retired to Seville, where he died in 1598. Among his works are Rethoricorum libri IV (1569), Comentaria in duodecim Prophetas (1571), Humanae Salutis Monumenta (1571), Virorum doctorum de disciplinis benemeritis efigies XLIV (1572), Davidis Regis ac Prophetae aliorumque sacrorum vatum Psalmi ex hebraica veritate in latinum carmen (1573), Elucidationes in IV Evangelia quibus accedunt erlucidationes in Acta Apostolorum (1575), De Varia Republica sive commentarium in librum Judicum (1592), and Davidis Psalmos priores comentaria (1605), most of which were printed by the press of Christophe Plantin, a prominent member of the aforementioned "Family of Love."

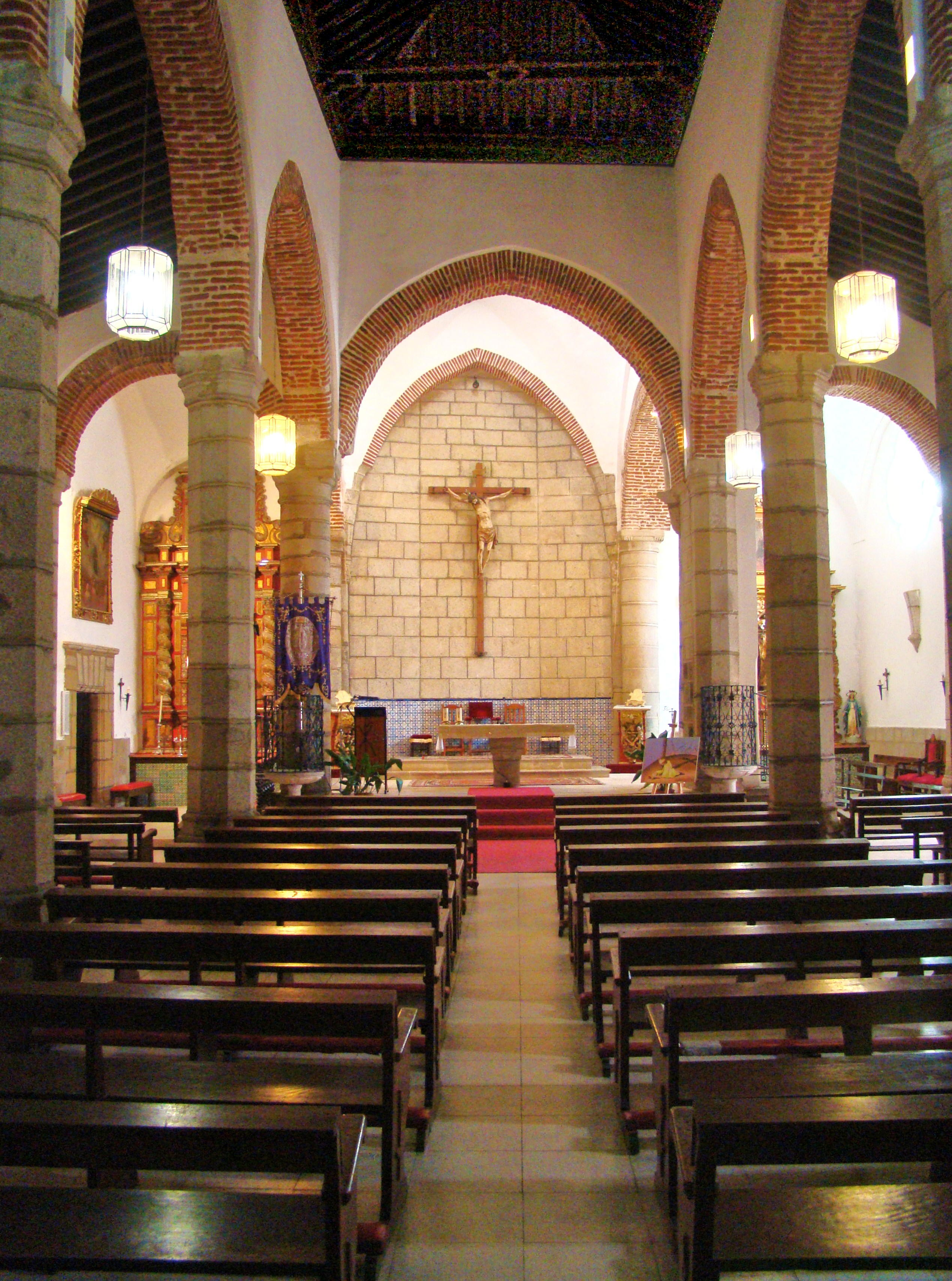
Central nave of the Church of Santa Catalina

Within what now constitutes the municipal boundaries of Fregenal was the old town of Valera, birthplace of the religious, philologist, and humanist Cipriano de Valera. He was a professor in London, Oxford, and Cambridge, and reviser of the translation of the first complete Spanish Bible, translated by his compatriot from Montemolín, Casiodoro de Reina, and published in Basel in 1569. Both monks, who professed at the Monastery of San Isidoro del Campo in Santiponce, Seville, found refuge in Europe, as the Inquisition sought to arrest them for their ideas aligned with the Reformation. He is noted for being a disciple of John Calvin, translating the first Spanish edition of Institutes of the Christian Religion in 1597.

The reformists believed that every believer should have access to the sacred text, not just clerics versed in classical languages. Hence, they undertook the meticulous task of translation and revision. Today, the version of the Bible known as the Reina-Valera or Bear Bible, with subsequent revisions, remains in use in all Hispanic Protestant communities worldwide.

Finally, the youngest of the Frexnense humanists was Cristóbal de Mesa, born in the town on 15 October 1556. He was a Spanish Golden Age poet associated with Mannerism. Although traditionally considered a native of Zafra, recent research has clarified his birth in Fregenal de la Sierra in 1556. Also of New Christian origins, he studied in Salamanca, where he was taught by the renowned humanist Francisco Sánchez de las Brozas, "el Brocense," a commentator on the works of Juan de Mena and Garcilaso de la Vega. Later, he resided in Seville, where he formed a relationship with the poet Fernando de Herrera. He then moved to Italy in 1586, establishing a close friendship with Torquato Tasso for five years. His friendship with Miguel de Cervantes, whose classical aesthetic ideas about theater he shared, is also well-known. Among his works are Las Navas de Tolosa (1594), La restauración de España (1607), El patrono de España (1612), Valle de lágrimas y diversas rimas (1607), as well as the tragedies El Pelayo and El Pompeyo. During the 16th century, Fregenal rose to prominence due to numerous "industries" dedicated to pottery, iron, and especially leather, gaining renown in the latter for many years. It also enjoyed flourishing trade. The importance of the nobility in the town enhanced its status compared to others, giving it prominence within the Kingdom of Seville as the last of the great strongholds of the Sevillians in the northern sierra. From this period dates the founding of the Convent of San Francisco in 1563 by the Franciscan friars of the Province of San Miguel, after a brief dispute with the Franciscan friars of the Province of San Gabriel, with two distinct communities in the hermitages of San Antón and the Santos Mártires. Ultimately, the community settled in the latter hermitage remained in the town until the confiscation of 1835.

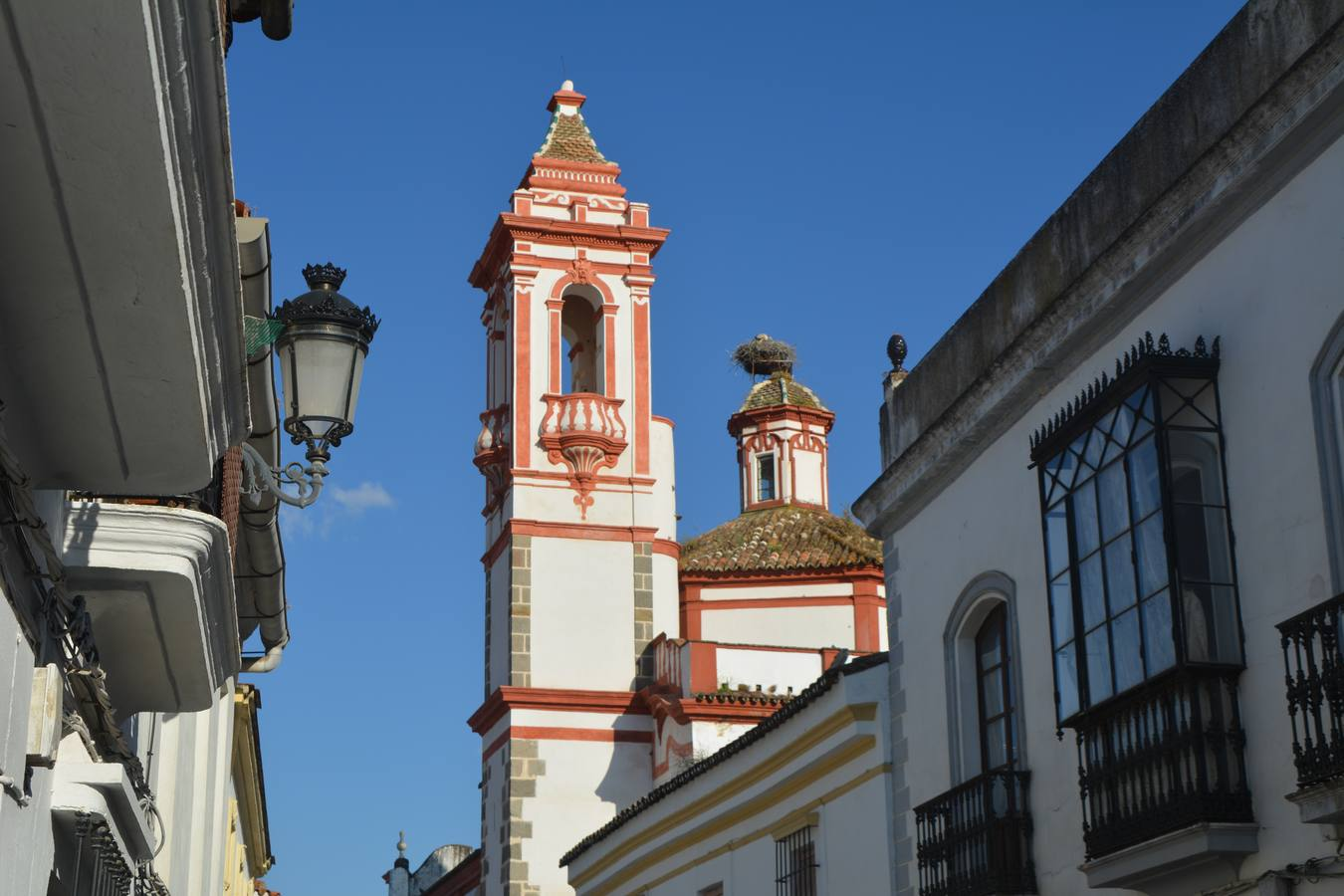
Tower and dome of the Church of San Ildefonso of the Society of Jesus

The population grew under this economic prosperity, reaching nearly 8,000 inhabitants. The Frexnense heritage continued to expand, driven by the prominent families settling in the city. The most significant case is that of Alonso de Paz, a noble merchant who invested his fortune in founding the Convent and College of the Society of Jesus for studies in grammar, philosophy, and theology, as well as the Convent of Our Lady of Peace, occupied since its founding in 1606 by the Augustinian Mothers. However, the crisis affecting the entire Peninsula was not foreign to Fregenal, and throughout the 16th century, numerous conflicts forced around 500 Frexnenses to abandon the area in search of a better life across the Empire.

This explains why many of Fregenal's illustrious figures were born during this period. This includes Juan Serrano, a 16th-century navigator who, in the service of Charles I, was part of the expedition of Ferdinand Magellan to the Spice Islands as one of its captains; Francisco Gómez Cid, governor and captain of Puerto Rico; Friar Juan Franco, Dominican and bishop of Manila; Friar Benito Hermoso, bishop of the West Indies; Friar Pablo Jerónimo Casquete, founder of the Capuchin convent in Seville, whose notable evangelizing work was primarily conducted in the former colonial territories of Guinea and Sierra Leone; Friar Francisco de Fregenal, reformer of the Order in Rome and Naples and vicar, commissary, and provincial in Spain; or Father Manuel Solórzano Escobar, a Jesuit missionary and martyr in the Mariana Islands, specifically on the island of Guam, where he is currently venerated. Likewise, other Frexnenses held significant positions within the Iberian Peninsula, such as García Bazán, a licensed lawyer, general commissary, and superintendent of royal revenues of the province, member of the Council of Castile, judge, and prosecutor in Valladolid; Alonso Tinoco de Castilla, judge of the Court of Seville and the Canary Islands; Joaquín Cid Carrascal, abbot of the Collegiate Church of San Salvador in Seville; or Antonio María Sánchez Cid Carrascal, bishop of Coria.

The migratory and subsistence process was exacerbated by the war of 1640, which, for nearly thirty years, highlighted the development achieved by the city. Numerous human and economic losses plunged Fregenal into deep decline. The 17th century saw the slow progress of a population that had once been prominent but, by the mid-century, barely reached around 2,500 inhabitants. This was compounded in the 18th century by the expulsion of the Jesuits from the kingdom through the Pragmatic Sanction of 1767. This event was significant for the population, as all Jesuit communities in the Badajoz diocese were brought to Fregenal, from where they were led in harsh conditions to exile by sea.

=== Contemporary age ===
==== 19th century ====
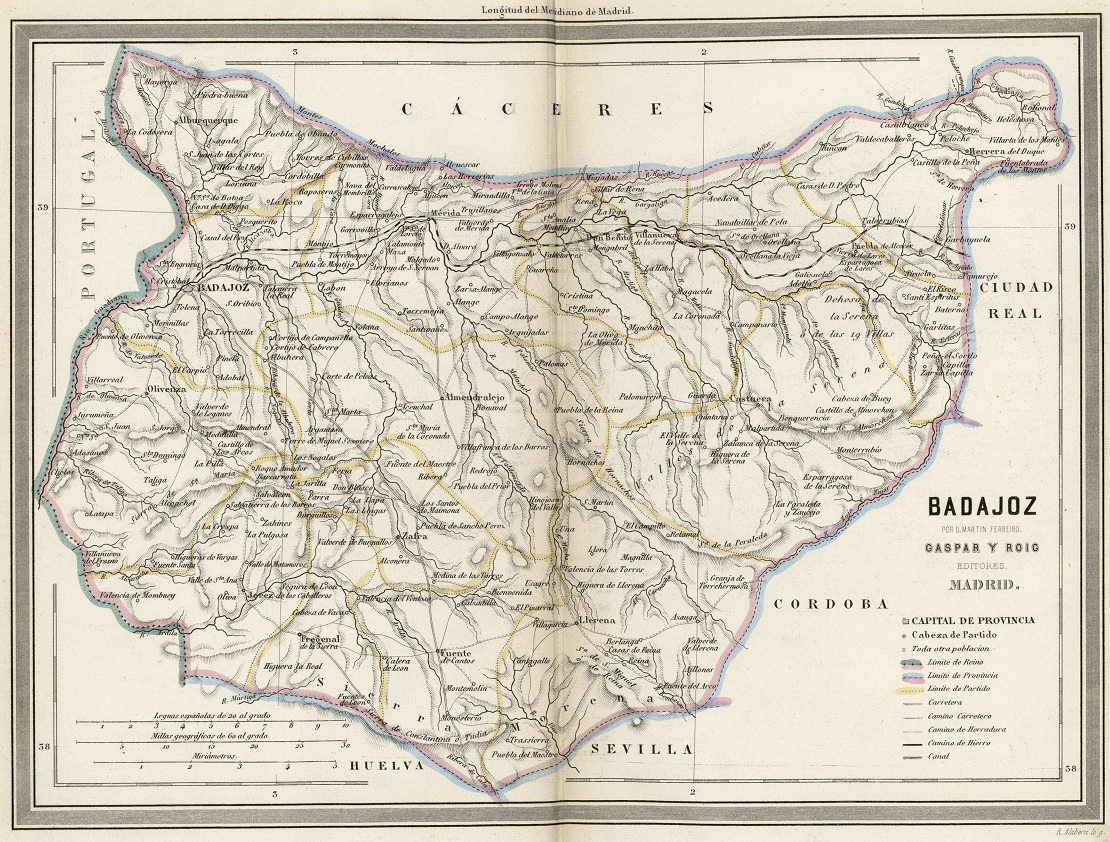
Map of the Province of Badajoz in 1864, featuring Fregenal

In the 19th century, as a reaffirmation of its misfortunes, the French occupation of the Castle occurred during the War of Independence. Once again, the town was embroiled in a conflict against Napoleonic invaders, with tragic confrontations. A new territorial model was established in 1833, prioritizing provinces over the old kingdoms. These reforms, carried out by the Secretary of State for Development, Javier de Burgos, saw Fregenal, which had been part of the Kingdom of Seville alongside Bodonal and Higuera for over five centuries, integrated into the Province of Badajoz due to its traditional position within the Diocese of Badajoz. Consequently, it became part of the Extremadura region, where it remains indefinitely. Its proximity to neighboring Andalusia, along with its inherited traditions, allows it to retain many cultural characteristics of its southern neighbors, skillfully blending its ancestral Sevillian character with its Extremaduran identity, reaffirmed two centuries later with the approval of the Statute of Autonomy of Extremadura.

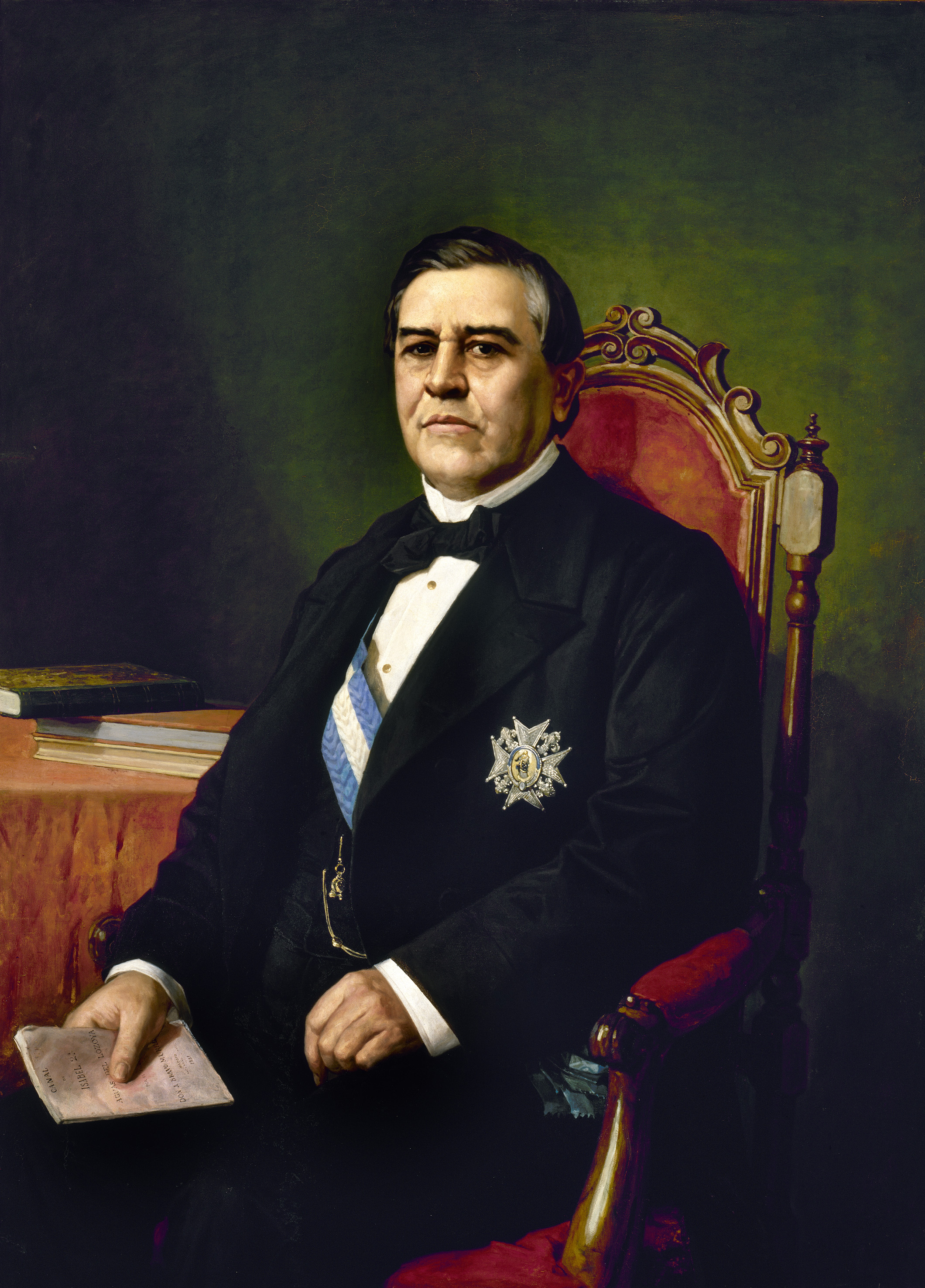
Juan Bravo Murillo, born in Fregenal in 1803

Juan Bravo Murillo, born on 9 June 1803 in the former La Jara Street (now Bravo Murillo Street), played a significant role in shaping 19th-century Spain. His career as an academic and jurist led him to study at the University of Seville and University of Salamanca, practicing law in prominent firms in Seville, the Provincial Court of Cáceres, and later settling in Madrid, where he joined the Moderate Party, rising to prominence among moderate deputies. He served in various conservative cabinets as Minister of Justice, Finance, and Development, becoming one of the main reformers of ministerial structures that persisted through the 19th and 20th centuries. He also reached the highest position as President of the Council of Ministers from 1850 to 1852. His key measures included consolidating the Public Treasury, improving the state's road and railway network, adopting the Metric System, creating the General Deposit Fund, promoting the Official State Gazette, enacting the Canary Islands Free Ports Law, signing the Concordat with the Holy See, and constructing the Canal de Isabel II, which channels water from the Lozoya River to Madrid, supplying the capital since 1858, considered his most significant governmental achievement.

Bravo Murillo's fall from the highest echelons of national politics was triggered by the attempted Constitutional Reform of 1852, deemed conservative and authoritarian for aiming to reduce the powers of the Congress of Deputies in favor of the monarchy. However, this project was rejected, and new progressive governments led by Espartero and O'Donnell diminished the moderates’ presence in the legislature. Bravo Murillo was largely absent from national politics, except for briefly serving as President of the Congress of Deputies between 1857 and 1858. After retiring from political life, he compiled his memoirs in six volumes of Opúsculos, covering his government tenure, including topics such as the Attempt on the Queen's Life; The Confiscation; On Taxes in Relation to Public Wealth; The No of Negrete; Notes for the History of the Liberal Union; The Past, Present, and Future of the Spanish Treasury; The 1852 Reform Project; and The Debt Arrangement.

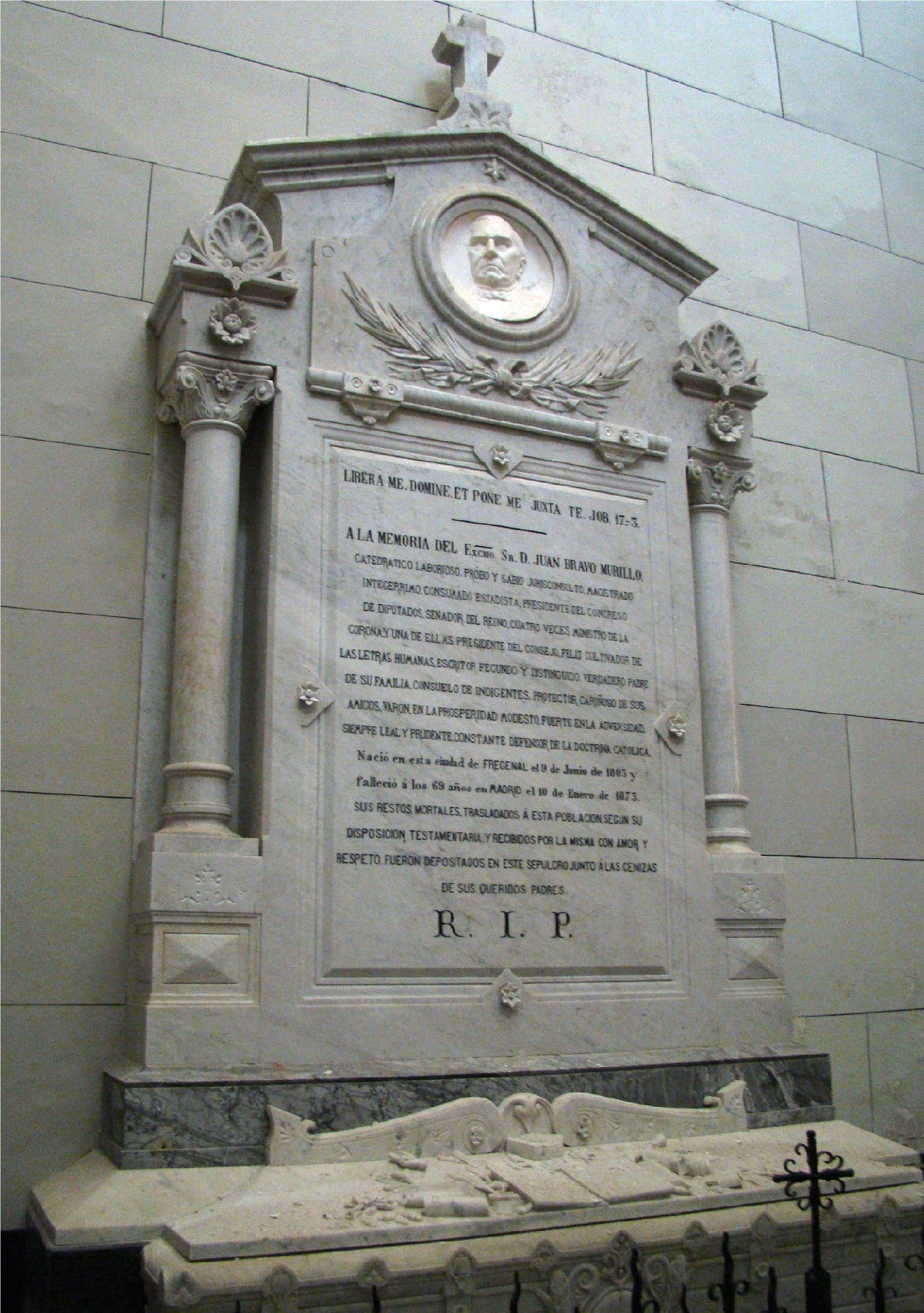
Mausoleum of Bravo Murillo in the Parish Church of Santa Ana

He received numerous accolades, including membership in the Royal Academy of History and an invitation to join the Royal Academy of Moral and Political Sciences, though he declined most honors during his lifetime, except for the cross of the Order of Charles III, the highest distinction of the Spanish state. He is also recognized by the inhabitants of the Canary Islands, who dedicated streets and monuments in his honor for the Free Ports Law, and by the citizens of Madrid, who similarly honor him with a street and monument. Likewise, the people of Fregenal pay tribute to his legacy, which remains a prominent part of the town's public life as one of its leading national figures. After his death in Madrid in 1873, his remains were transferred to Fregenal, where they rest in a mausoleum dedicated to him in the Church of Santa Ana.

Contemporary to the figure of Juan Bravo Murillo, Ventura Camacho Carbajo, born in 1819, stands out as a notable figure. He served as director of the Seville University Library from 1848 and as a professor at the Faculty of Law of the same university from 1855. He was a founder and distinguished member of the Sevillian Academy of Jurisprudence and Legislation. In 1853, he established La Ley: revista de legislación, jurisprudencia, administración y notariado and directed the Carlist newspaper El Oriente, published in Seville between 1869 and 1873. He is credited with authoring the novena dedicated to Our Lady Saint Mary of the Remedies, patroness of Fregenal.

Following the fall of the Ancien Régime, the locality became a constitutional municipality in the region of Extremadura. After the territorial reforms following the establishment of Queen Isabella II's reign, a new jurisdictional distribution was configured, shaping the new map of judicial districts. Thus, in 1834, the Fregenal de la Sierra judicial district was established, with its seat in the city of Fregenal, overseeing the localities of Bodonal de la Sierra, Higuera la Real, Segura de León, Fuentes de León, Cabeza la Vaca, and Valverde de Burguillos. In the 1842 census, Fregenal had 1,260 households and 4,620 inhabitants.

With the new Constitution of 1845, new legislation was promoted regarding the Spanish electoral system, dividing constituencies into single-member electoral districts. This reform was implemented through the Electoral Law for the Appointment of Deputies to the Courts of 18 March 1846. Through this law, it was established that one of the ten districts into which the Badajoz constituency was divided would be based in Fregenal. The first deputy to the Congress elected for the Fregenal district, in the 1847 general elections, was Juan Bravo Murillo. The Fregenal district continued to have representation in the Congress of Deputies until the electoral reform of 1931, during the Second Spanish Republic, which abolished single-member districts in favor of provincial constituencies.

On 5 February 1873, Amadeo I of Spain granted Fregenal the honorary title of city, at the proposal of the Minister of the Interior, Manuel Ruiz Zorrilla, in agreement with the Council of Ministers. This honorary title was awarded to the town of Fregenal due to the many services rendered to the crown by its inhabitants throughout history. The process of elevating Fregenal's status to that of a city began in June 1815, when the request for the title was initiated, which was granted a few decades later.

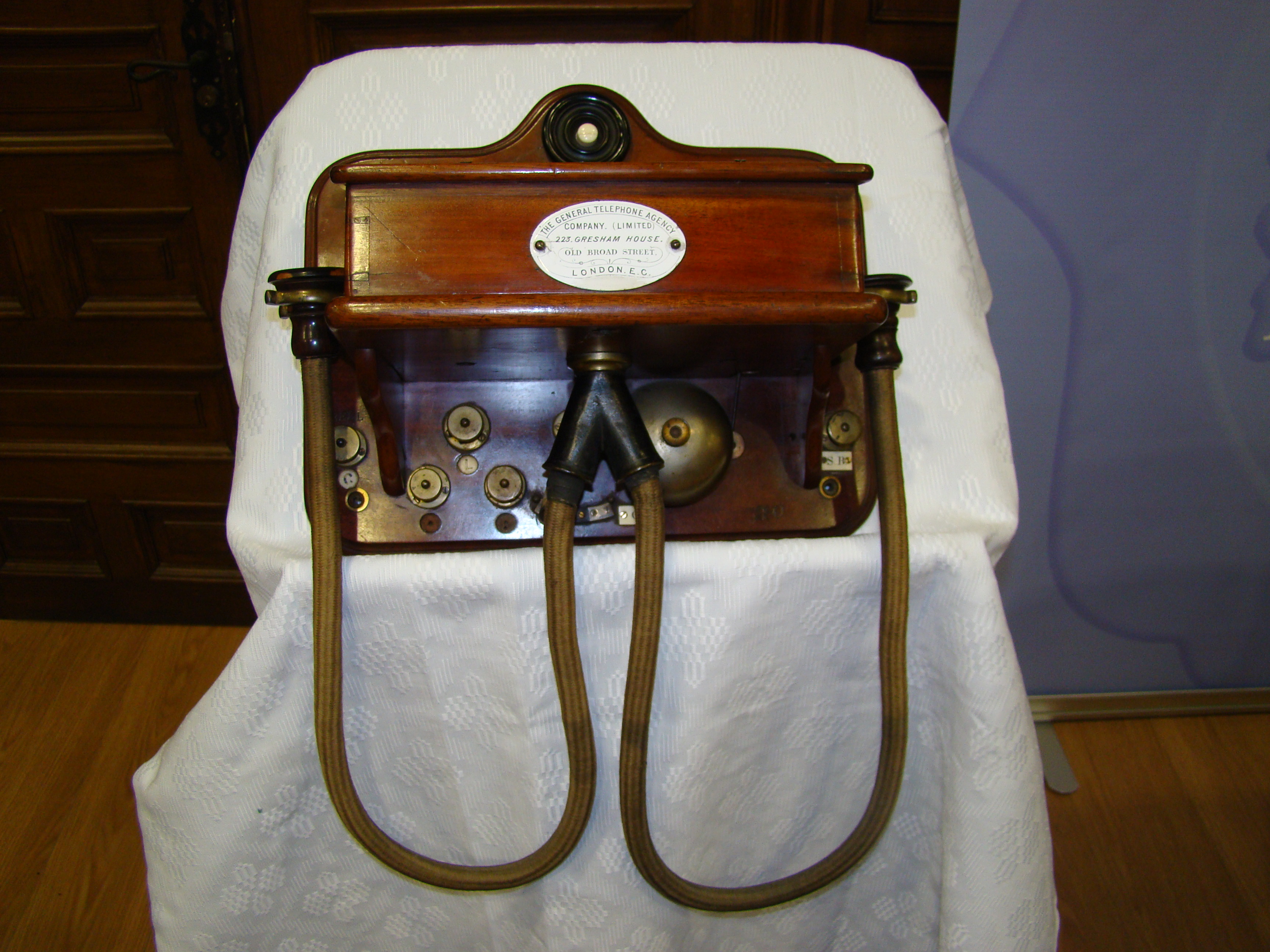
Original Gower-Bell telephone with which the first long-distance telephone call in Spain was made in 1880 by Rodrigo Sánchez-Arjona y Sánchez-Arjona

In 1880, Fregenal marked a milestone in Spain's technological advancement. This achievement was led by another illustrious son of the city, Rodrigo Sánchez-Arjona y Sánchez-Arjona. Coming from one of the city's most prominent families, which still has branches in the town today, Sánchez-Arjona was a doctor of law and a member of the Royal Cavalry Order of Seville. His comfortable financial situation allowed him to travel the world. His visit to the Paris Universal Exposition of 1878 was of great importance for Fregenal. There, he discovered a new device that enabled communication between geographically distant individuals. Using his contacts, he acquired two telephones of the Gower-Bell model for personal use. These devices were installed at his home on Santa Clara Street and at the Las Mimbres estate, owned by his family. After obtaining the necessary permits, Sánchez-Arjona established a telephone line connecting these two locations, spanning 32 kilometers. This process began after the Fregenal Town Council approved the installation of a telegraph line connecting to Zafra in February 1880. On 19 March 1880, the first call was made between the two locations. This communication is widely regarded as the first made in rural Spain; some sources consider it the first long-distance call in Spain and possibly in Europe. Subsequently, contact was established with Seville on 27 December of the same year and with Cádiz on 28 December, breaking the world record previously held by the Americans. In later years, Rodrigo Sánchez-Arjona proposed creating a telephone line connecting all the localities in the Fregenal region. This line was promoted by the mayors of the judicial district and aimed to connect the district's main town with the rest of the localities. The lack of support from the central Spanish government, combined with the financial insufficiency of the Fregenal town council, which was already led by Sánchez-Arjona as mayor in 1881, thwarted this initiative, which would not materialize until 1912 through the National Interurban Telephone Company.

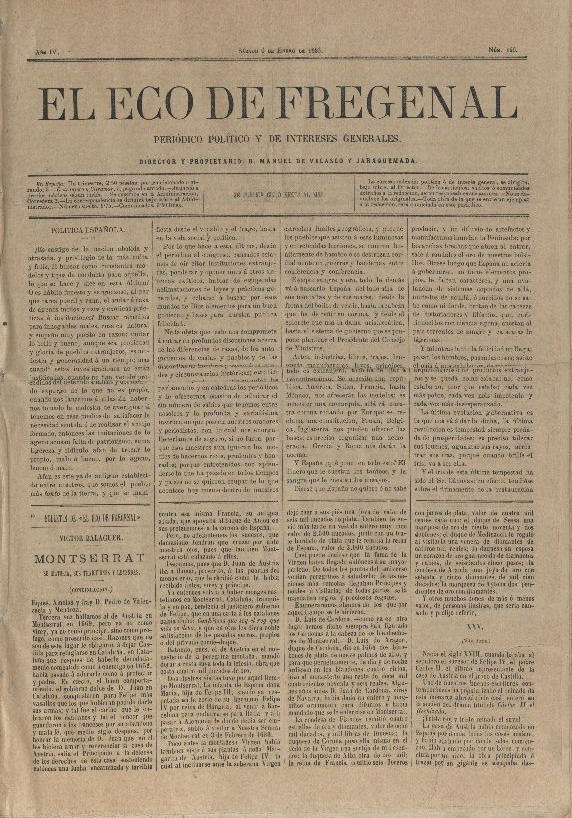
Cover of Eco de Fregenal on 6 January 1883

In the spring of 1880, the Eco de Fregenal was born, the first communication medium in Fregenal, reflecting the influence of democratic ideas spread during the 19th century. This weekly became a significant platform for sharing information in the judicial district's main town and fostered substantial reflection on the political and rural life in Fregenal at the end of the ~~19~~ and the beginning of the 20th century. Its first edition was published on 1 March 1880, with a print run of 2,000 copies and five monthly issues. The foundation was driven by Manuel de Velasco y Jaraquemada, Marquis of Riocabado, and Luis Romero y Espinosa, a folklorist from Fregenal.

The importance of Fregenal in the development and study of folklore was particularly significant, largely due to the figure of the Fregenal folklorist Luis Romero y Espinosa. His work was widely recognized among the most learned in the field. His efforts in compiling popular culture were reflected in his most important works: El Folk-lore frexnense and El Folklore Bético-Extremeño. Both publications took place in 1883, with significant involvement from the editorial team of the Eco de Fregenal, supported by the Marquis of Riocabado and located on Corredera Street (now Marqués de Riocabado Street).

In the same year, 1883, the painter Eugenio Hermoso Martínez was born on the former El Agua Street. The eminent Fregenal native was initially guided in painting by Gonzalo Bilbao and José Jiménez Aranda in Seville, moving to Madrid in 1901. In 1905, he traveled to Paris, where he was introduced to avant-garde art. In 1912, he exhibited in London. In 1934, he exhibited in Argentina, Chile, and Brazil. A professor at the San Fernando School of Fine Arts, his final opposition to abstraction was driven by the paramount importance he always placed on the human figure. Through a classic and iconographic language, he transitioned with a personal and unmistakable style from the impressionist, modernist, and colorful early works to the more intense expressionism of his later series of paintings titled Nertóbrigas. He taught generations of Spanish artists his experience of modernity.

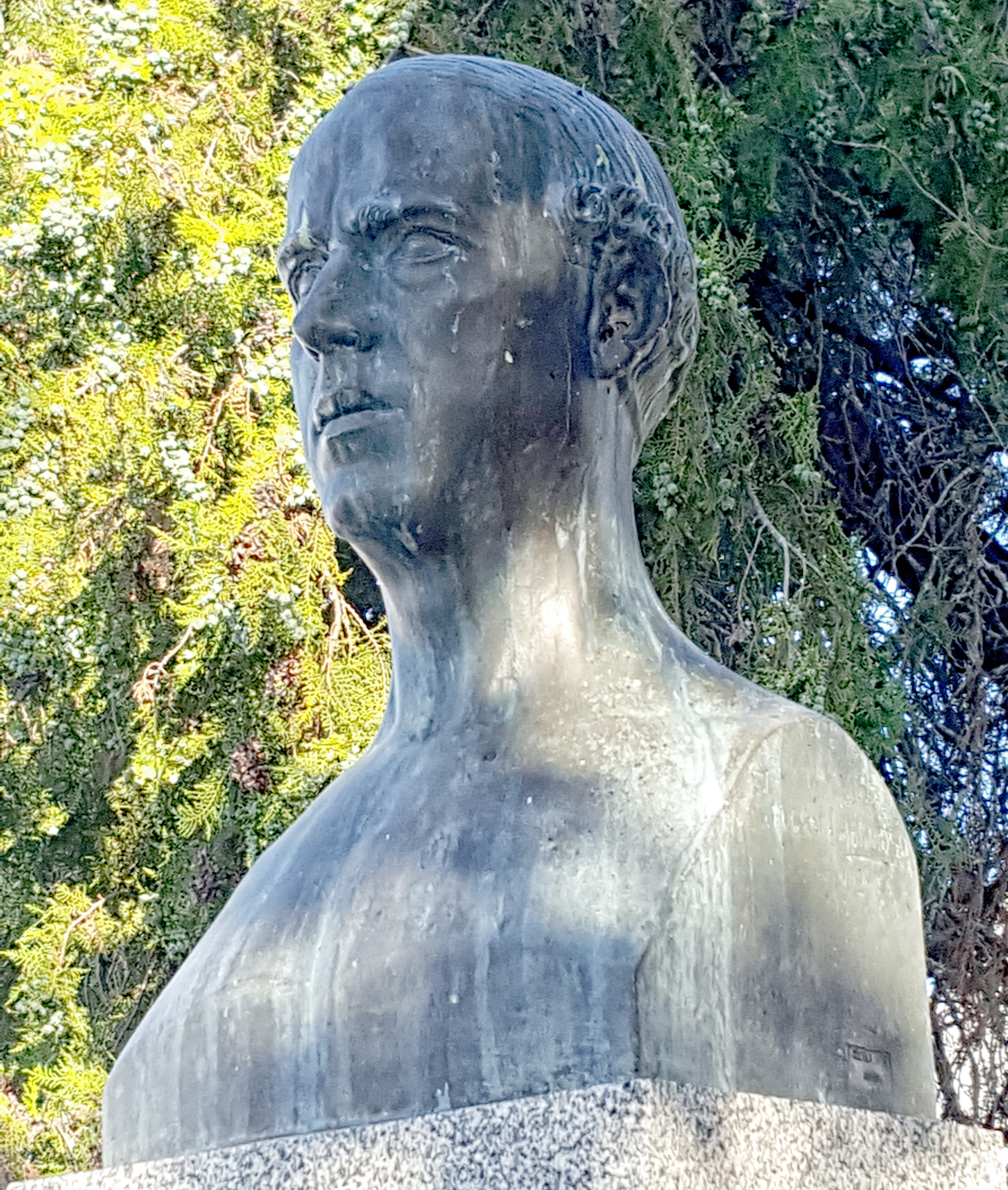
Sculptural self-portrait by Eugenio Hermoso that crowns the artist's tomb in the Fregenal municipal cemetery

Eugenio Hermoso is considered by specialized critics as one of "the great masters" of Extremaduran painting, to which he contributed his particular penchant for portraying a notable gallery of popular types (in small and medium formats) as well as producing a continuous series of large compositions inspired by his hometown, endorsed in many cases by numerous national and international awards and recognitions. Notable among these are his promising Muchacha haciendo media (Third Medal at the National Fine Arts Exhibition of 1904), Hijas del terruño (First Prize at the Fine Arts Circle Exhibition the following year), La Juma, la Rifa y sus amigas (Second Medal at the National Fine Arts Exhibition of 1906 and the International Exhibition of Barcelona in 1907), Rosa (Second Medal at the National Fine Arts Exhibitions of 1908), A la fiesta del pueblo (First Medal at the National Fine Arts Exhibition of 1917), several nudes, among which El baño de las zagalas (1923) stands out, sent to the National Fine Arts Exhibition of 1924, and, finally, the coveted Medal of Honor at the National Fine Arts Exhibition of 1948 for his works Altar and Las siembras.

In his sculptural work, he created, among others, the bronze bust of Benito Arias Montano (1927), "donated to Fregenal" on the occasion of the fourth centenary of the humanist's birth, along with some documented self-portraits, one of which crowns the artist's tomb in the municipal cemetery. He was also the author of a voluminous autobiography titled Vida de Eugenio Hermoso (Francisco Teodoro de Nertóbriga (1955). Madrid: Ediciones Castilla), from which numerous details about the painter and the national artistic world of the first half of the 20th century can be extracted. He was a member of the Royal Academy of Fine Arts of San Fernando and the Santa Isabel de Hungría Academy in Seville, as well as an honorary member of the Fine Arts Circle of Madrid. Today, the bulk of his work is preserved in a House-Museum located in Fregenal, in addition to private collections and Spanish and foreign museums. Upon his death in Madrid in 1963, his remains were transferred to Fregenal, where they rest in a tomb crowned by a bust he created himself. He is considered one of the most important Spanish painters of the 20th century, as well as one of the most significant figures in the plastic arts in Extremadura, with a notable presence in the Museums of Fine Arts of Cáceres and Badajoz.

Rafael Gómez Catón was another notable painter who was born in Fregenal on November 14, 1890. Although his work primarily focused on landscape painting, in his early years he produced a series of portraits inspired by the style of Eugenio Hermoso, from whom he took drawing lessons in the summer of 1902. Some still lifes, full of light and executed with a more perfectionist and detailed technique, are also preserved. Among the artist's numerous works, notable pieces include El acueducto (1910), Cuenca (c. 1918), La del Pico de la Noria or Conce (1924), Paisaje de Fregenal (1939), and Chocolatero (1953).

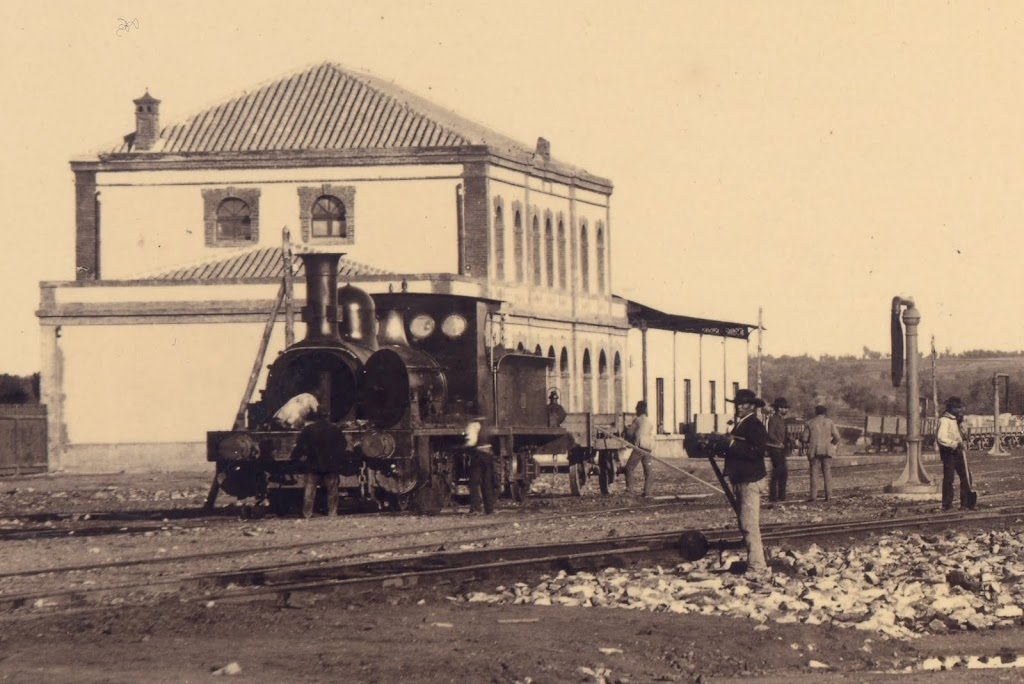
Railway workers cleaning a locomotive boiler at the Fregenal de la Sierra railway station at the end of the 19th century

The railway arrived in Fregenal with the inauguration of the Zafra-Huelva line in 1889, closely linked to the significant mining operations in the Huelva mountains. The town's railway station, which has remained largely unchanged since its opening, was opened to the public on 1 January 1889, following the completion of the section connecting Zafra with Valdelamusa. The railway became a cornerstone for Fregenal's communications with the rest of the national geography, providing sufficient infrastructure to establish it as a distribution point for mining products from nearby towns, such as Cala or Jerez de los Caballeros.

Similarly, the train provided an important means of transport for the population, which made extensive use of it throughout much of the 20th century. The presence of this transport in Fregenal's current life is minimal. Although a medium-distance line connecting the cities of Huelva and Madrid passes through the town, enabling connections with other cities in Extremadura, the lack of trains is evident, and the line has become largely obsolete despite renovations carried out in 2010. This once-critical means of transport has been practically relegated to oblivion due to the scarcity of trains, passengers, and the will to improve the line.

=== 20th century ===
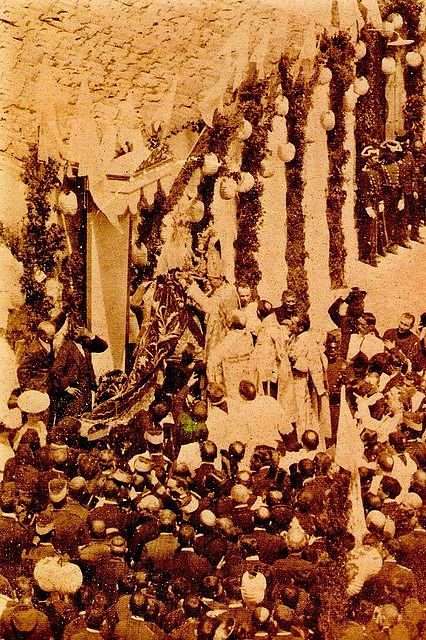
Coronation of Our Lady Saint Mary of the Remedies in the Constitution Promenade by Félix Soto Mancera, 27 April 1906

In 1906, one of the most significant events in Fregenal's history took place. Coinciding with the fourth centenary of the proclamation of Our Lady Saint Mary of the Remedies as the Patroness of Fregenal, her canonical coronation was promoted. The devotion to the Patroness, with over four centuries of history and great importance throughout the Diocese of Badajoz, garnered support from the highest ecclesiastical authorities. From there, the request was elevated to the Holy See in Rome. The entire Badajoz clergy, led by Félix Soto Mancera, Bishop of Badajoz, supported the effort to obtain Rome's approval. Ultimately, the grace was granted to the Holy Image, which was crowned in the Constitution Promenade on 27 April 1906. This event attracted attention from the entire region and high national authorities. The Virgin of the Remedies was the first image crowned in Extremadura. Moreover, the ceremonies were presided over by the King of Spain, Alfonso XIII, represented in the Extremaduran city by the Marquis of Riocabado. The coronation ceremony was performed by the Bishop of the Diocese of Badajoz, Félix Soto Mancera. Some sources note that the ceremony was witnessed by tens of thousands of people who filled the town's main square. This event held special significance in a traditionally Christian city with deep devotion to its Patroness. Additionally, actions were promoted to aid the city's poor, who received alms in accordance with the Catholic principle of charity. The honors bestowed upon the Patroness were significant, with the Virgin wearing the arms of Fregenal represented on her mantle and the jewel crowning the image, which contains the symbols of Fregenal.

At the beginning of the century, two artists of international renown were born in Fregenal. Manuel Infante, also known as el Niño de Fregenal, was born in 1911 on Jabugo Street. His frail appearance belied his singing, described as "solid, complete, and with a broad repertoire." In the same year, the sculptor José Barragán Rodríguez was born. After studying Sculpture and Drawing at the San Fernando School of Fine Arts in 1952, he moved to Colombia, specifically to Medellín, where he produced most of his work. In 2012, the artist's family donated a series of his works to the Town Council, including the bronze bust of Juan Bravo Murillo, installed at Pilar Redondo in 1973 to mark the first centenary of the politician and jurist's death.

Throughout the first half of the 20th century, Fregenal reached its peak population, exceeding 10,000 inhabitants. This figure made it one of the main cities in the south of the Province of Badajoz, on par with the region's most significant towns. Most of the population was primarily engaged in agricultural tasks, which remain the most important activity in the locality. This contributed to the establishment of new socialist ideologies in the town, supported by the working conditions of the majority of people employed in the fields. Land ownership, as in the rest of southern Spain, was predominantly latifundist; workers were characterized as day laborers, meaning individuals who worked during daylight hours in exchange for a daily wage.

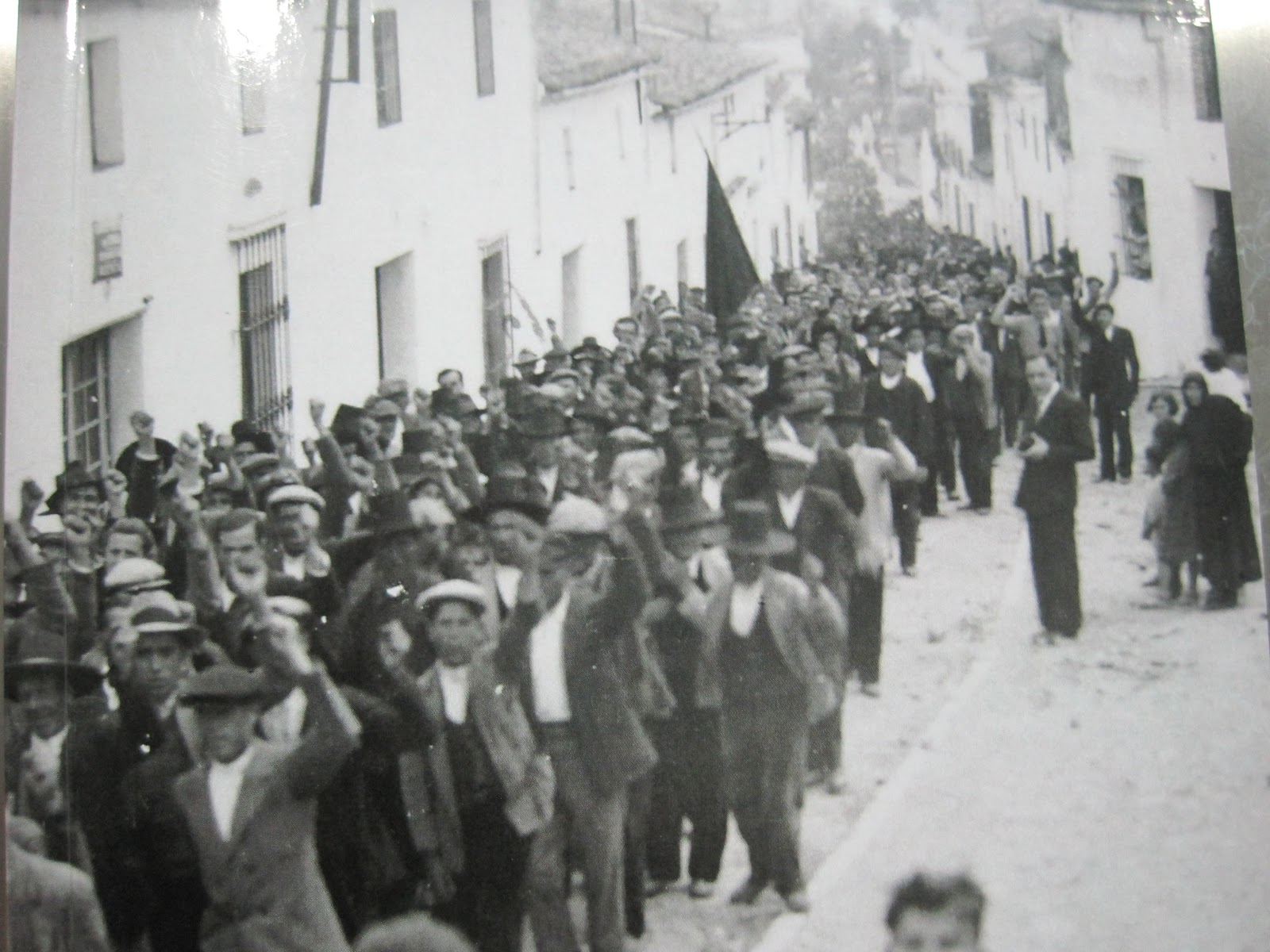
Celebration of 1 May 1936 in Fregenal

The founding of the first socialist group in Fregenal dates back to 23 April 1919. The Luz y Vida group, inspired by socialist and Masonic principles, joined the Spanish Socialist Workers' Party in October of the same year. The newspaper El Socialista reported that 182 members joined the group, beginning to participate in Fregenal's politics. As a result, in the 1920 elections, four socialist councilors were elected out of nine candidates. Among them, José María Luna Chamorro stood out, elected as the first deputy mayor and temporarily serving as Fregenal's first socialist mayor.

The proclamation of the Spanish Republic in Fregenal took place on 16 April 1931, during a plenary session of the Town Council following the democratic elections of 14 April. The mayor elected in this session was Pedro López Navarrete, who led the monarchy's supporters. However, during the council's constitutive session, a Management Commission was established due to the proclamation of the Spanish Republic at the behest of the civil governor of the Province of Badajoz, chaired by Manuel Sánchez Romasanta of the Radical Republican Party. The commission managed the municipality until the elections on 31 May 1931, which favored the republicans. Thus, the first democratic Town Council was established on 5 June in an extraordinary session, during which Manuel Sánchez Romasanta, a radical republican, was elected.

With the arrival of the Second Spanish Republic in Spain, Fregenal became a significant political and population hub in southern Extremadura. This led to visits by three ministers in 1931. The strengthening of leftist ideas established a solid foundation in favor of the new Republic in the town, largely supported by the presence of agricultural workers. The agrarian reform became the center of political debate in Fregenal. Developed by the first governments of Manuel Azaña, the agrarian reform aimed to eliminate latifundist property in favor of agricultural workers, redistributing large estates previously held by a few owners. Fregenal, with 10,277 inhabitants at the start of the 1930s, became the hub for orchestrating this property restructuring in the south of the province, affecting towns such as Zafra, Fuente de Cantos, and Jerez de los Caballeros. Similarly, the Republic brought significant infrastructure and educational institutions to the town. The 1936 management commission recorded the creation of a new primary school on 22 April of that year, historically known as Los Escolares, now housing the Arias Montano primary and nursery school. Likewise, the republican government established a new secondary and vocational education institute on Santa Clara Street, the precursor to the current Eugenio Hermoso secondary and baccalaureate institute.

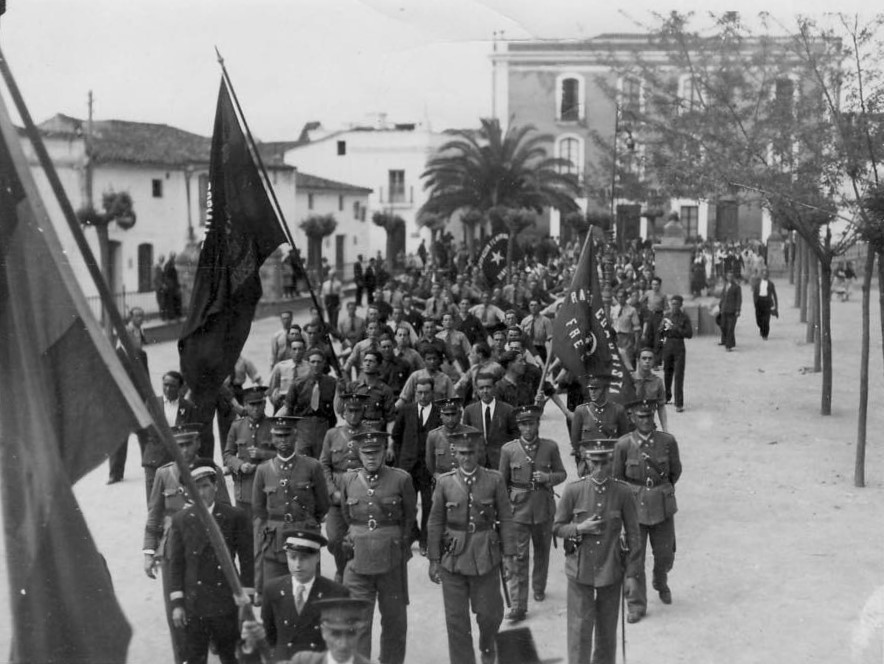
Demonstration in the Constitution Promenade on 1 May 1936

Previously, in February 1936, a management commission chaired by Victoriano Cordero González, president of the Casa del Pueblo, was appointed by the civil governor of Badajoz to prepare for the municipal elections scheduled for April of that year. On 15 April 1936, Victoriano Cordero González was elected mayor, the last democratic mayor of Fregenal, remaining in office until 18 September 1936, when the city was occupied by rebel troops.

At the outbreak of the Spanish Civil War, Fregenal was a significant population center supportive of the Republic. Numerous incidents occurred in the town involving forces from both sides. Notable is the episode involving the municipal corporation and the Committee for the Defense of the Republic, which decided to confine the city's aristocrats in the Cinema Bravo. An attempt by republican sympathizers to set fire to the building was thwarted, among others, by the mayor of Fregenal in the final days of the Republic, Victoriano Cordero González. He, along with his socialist comrades, died after the arrival of rebel troops for defending the democratic and republican regime.

Due to the late date when Fregenal was taken by the rebel troops against the Spanish Republic, the city accumulated people fleeing from the Huelva mountains and various areas of the Province of Badajoz already captured by the rebel army. The first wave of refugees from the Province of Huelva fled the troops sent after the capture of Badajoz on 14 August, arriving from Huelva towns such as Zalamea la Real, Nerva, or Riotinto. The miners' columns aimed to reach republican territory to travel to Madrid and aid in the capital's defense. The Espartaco column, composed of well-equipped miners, stood out. These columns stopped in late August and early September in towns such as Fregenal de la Sierra and Valencia del Ventoso, where they mainly gathered food supplies. As the columns passed, many Extremadurans joined them in an attempt to escape. With the capture of towns south of Badajoz, such as Santa Marta, Feria, Almendral, Barcarrota, and Villanueva del Fresno, the mass of people fleeing the rebels accumulated in Jerez de los Caballeros and Fregenal de la Sierra. Sheltering so many people became a challenge. The capture of Segura de León and Burguillos del Cerro on 14 September exacerbated this situation. From Segura de León alone, 500 people had fled. In total, around 8,000 refugees fleeing the rebels gathered in Fregenal.

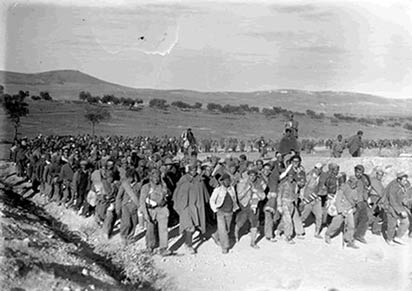
Column of the Eight Thousand, originating in Fregenal

Faced with the imminent capture of Fregenal, the refugees near the town, mostly at its railway station, decided to depart on 15 September in search of republican positions. The chosen route crossed the Vía de la Plata at Fuente de Cantos, heading toward Azuaga. To avoid detection by rebel troops, they used livestock trails connecting Fregenal and Segura, through the so-called old Fregenal road, and then entered the Cañada Real Leonesa Occidental, heading toward Fuente de Cantos. Crossing the Vía de la Plata was a highly dangerous moment. At this point, the column departed from the Cañada Real and traveled across the countryside toward the road. They crossed at night to avoid skirmishes. After crossing the Vía de la Plata, the column entered the Senda, a well-known path crossing the municipalities of Montemolín, Puebla del Maestre, and Llerena from west to east. The advance of the Column of the Eight Thousand was known to the nationalist commanders in Seville, led by Queipo de Llano, who, with the help of informants and a reconnaissance plane, monitored the column's movements. In the afternoon of 17 September, the column left the Senda and entered the Cañada Real del Pencón. The Mérida-Los Rosales railway line marked the border between republican and rebel-controlled territory. The rebel troops attacked the column on 18 September at the Alcornocosa hill, near the Cañada Real del Pencón, close to the towns of Reina and Fuente del Arco, beside the railway line. The unexpected attack resulted, according to official figures, in 80 deaths and 30 injuries, though some sources suggest a higher death toll. In the confusion of the attack and the night, some militiamen advancing with the column were killed by their own comrades to prevent their escape. Despite the attack, a steady stream of people managed to cross and reach Valverde de Llerena and Azuaga that night and in the following days. The stragglers also managed to escape the skirmish. The attack was reported in the media, including radio broadcasts in Seville, ABC de Sevilla, and the front page of Diario HOY on 19 September. The rebel army took 1,200 prisoners, who were taken to Llerena and executed according to the criteria of that side.

Once Fregenal was taken by the rebel troops on 18 September 1936, they appointed Manuel Guridi Jáuregui as mayor, who held the position until Manuel González Bermudo was designated on 6 March 1937. González Bermudo served as mayor of Fregenal and general secretary of the Movement in the town until the regime's end and the establishment of the first democratic town councils in 1979, holding the mayoralty uninterruptedly for 42 years, encompassing the end of the Spanish Civil War, the entirety of the Francoist dictatorship, and the Transition to democracy. During the post-war period, Fregenal's population grew until the 1960s, with its main economic activities being agriculture and livestock. During these years, the Fiftieth Anniversary Celebrations of Our Lady of the Remedies were held, where the regime honored the patroness of Fregenal with the title of Captain General.

In the years following the Civil War, three nationally prominent artists were born and raised in Fregenal. The eldest was Julio García Casas, born in the city in 1933. He was a pianist, magistrate, and professor of Spanish law. An academic at the most prestigious state institutions, he received the Mozart Medal from UNESCO in December 1997 for his contributions to music. He also received the highest distinctions as an artist from the French government (Chevalier des Arts et des Lettres) and the Spanish government (Commendation with Plaque of the Order of Alfonso X the Wise). The potter Rafael Ortega Porras, born in 1938, was one of Spain's most renowned ceramists during his peak, awarded the Second Prize at the Madrid Nativity Scene Contest (1968), the Gold Medal from the Ministry of Housing (1972), the National Craftsmanship Award (1982), the Second National Ceramics Award (1988), the Extremadura Medal granted under Decree 99/1998 of 28 July for his “love for his land and the pride with which he carries his Extremaduran identity around the world, along with his extensive artistic career,” the titles of Master Artisan (1999), and Favorite Son of Fregenal de la Sierra (2000), among others. Lastly, the painter Manuel Parralo Dorado, born in 1945, should be noted. An emeritus professor, he served as Dean of the Faculty of Fine Arts at the Complutense University of Madrid, received the Medal of Honor from the same university, was a corresponding member of the Royal Academy of Fine Arts Santa Isabel de Hungría in Seville, and received the Cross of Alfonso X the Wise. Among his main contributions to Fregenal society is his prolific involvement in the Eugenio Hermoso International Painting Award, serving as the jury president of the pictorial contest.

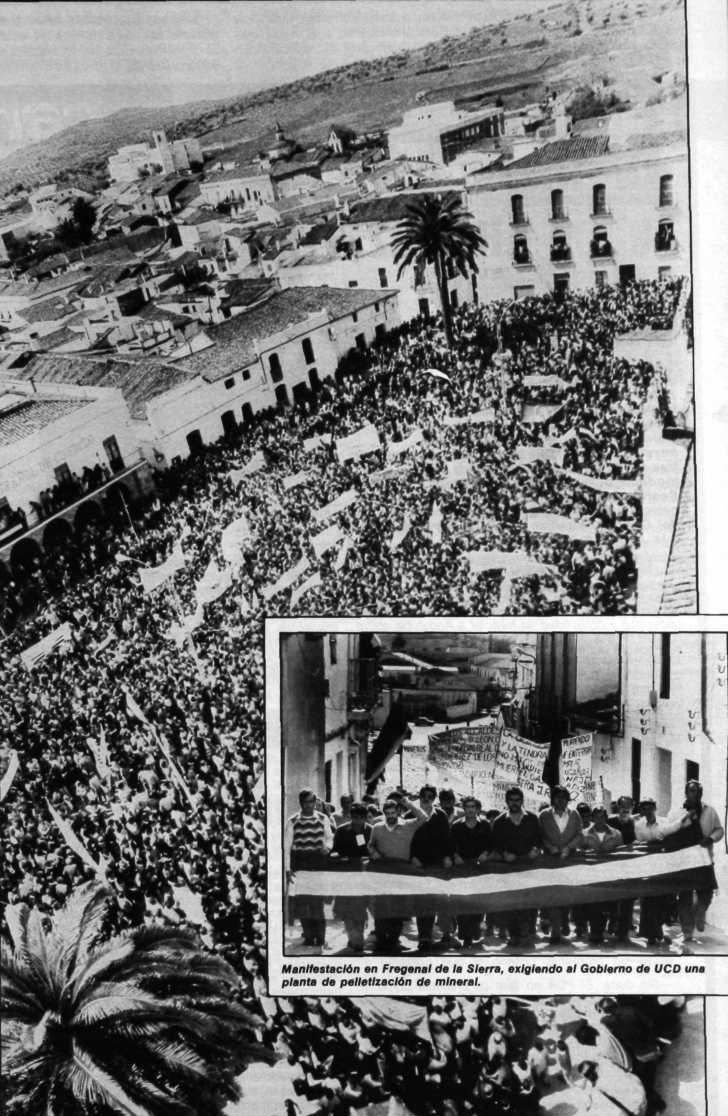
Demonstration in the Constitution Promenade in defense of Presur on 25 April 1982

During the democratic era, Fregenal fought for its rights in the early years when the Government of Spain sought to revive the city's economy with the help of the railway network passing through it. In this context, the Fregenal region was declared a Zone of Urgent Industrialization within Spain's industrial reconversion process. The main project for the reconversion of Fregenal's economy was Prerreducidos Integrados del Suroeste, better known by its acronym Presur. The Presur plant was a promise from the UCD government, enabling the continued operation of the Cala mines and promoting the region's mining sector through a strong commitment to transforming raw materials into industrial derivatives. In addition to producing pellets, the plant's main original task, it included a robust research project. The plant dedicated space to studying natural resources and ornamental rocks, granite, and marble, as well as processing ferroalloys to produce nickel-chromium ingots, a demonstration plant for ferroalloy processing, and the most notable project, plasma research for studying new materials, the only one of its kind in Spain at the time.

The opening of Presur was a major political event throughout Extremadura. It involved the participation of the main leaders of the Spanish Socialist Workers' Party (PSOE), who promoted the plant's opening. Among those events, the visit of Felipe González to the Cala mines while he was still the opposition leader to the government of Adolfo Suárez stands out. Regarding events in Fregenal, the massive demonstration on 25 April 1982, which gathered between 40,000 and 50,000 people around the Constitution Promenade, where the Extremadura Regional Government was holding a permanent assembly, demanded the immediate launch of a pellets plant.

Although Presur opened in 1983, news of a possible radiation leak from the plant in June 1998 led to its closure. The cesium-137 leak did not affect the workers, according to the Nuclear Safety Council report. The socialist majority in the Fregenal de la Sierra Town Council expressed opposition to the plant's closure in a plenary session on 19 June 1998, but strong opposition from the People's Party and United Left, combined with some fear among the population, led to the closure of the plant, which had been the main driver of Fregenal's industrialization in the 1980s and 1990s.

In 1991, the Cristina Hotel was established through the initiative of entrepreneur Ángel del Cid Pol. Its inauguration was a true social event for the city of Fregenal, with the participation of the main regional authorities. The same entrepreneur founded Matadero Frexnense S.A. (MAFRESA), currently the main industry in Fregenal. Del Cid, of Leonese origin but with deep Fregenal roots, received support from the Government of Extremadura, led by Juan Carlos Rodríguez Ibarra, and the Economy Councilor, Manuel Amigo, to establish what was Spain's leading meat industry. A 6,000-square-meter factory in 1993 grew to 24,000 square meters by 1999, slaughtering 8,000 pigs annually at its start and reaching 60,000 by the early 21st century. A central agroindustry for the Extremaduran economy, it employed 202 permanent workers at its peak, not counting jobs derived from the factory's activity. The company exports Fregenal products to distant countries such as Mexico, South Korea, Japan, Angola, Russia, and Brazil.

On 22 October 1995, Televisión Fregenal was founded, the first audiovisual communication medium in Fregenal's history. The initiative came from a group of people from Fregenal's civil society, led by Juan Ignacio Márquez Martínez, a correspondent for Diario de Extremadura HOY since September 1990. The first televised program was a debate among representatives of the Fregenal Town Council: Luis Moreno Gamito, mayor from the Socialist Party; José María Velasco Díaz, councilor spokesperson for the People's Party; and Fernando González Durán, councilor spokesperson for United Left. This medium has operated for over a quarter of a century, transforming into ZF Televisión. It remains the reference medium for information on Fregenal's social, political, cultural, religious, and sporting life.

==== 21st century ====
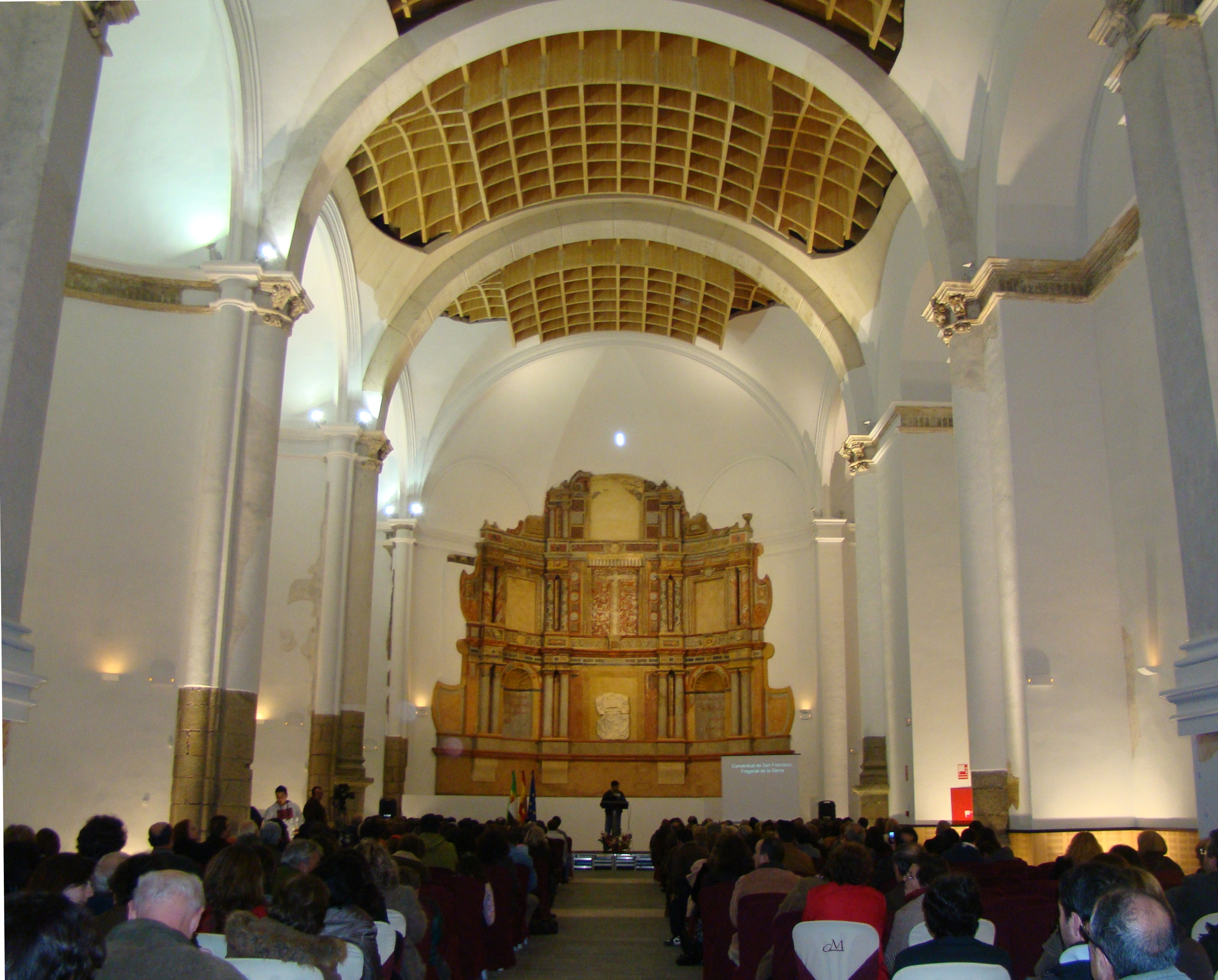
Inauguration of the San Francisco Convent on 21 February 2011

The new century brought a growing sentiment for the recovery of lost historical spaces in Fregenal's heritage. The 1991 declaration of the historic-artistic complex of Fregenal de la Sierra as a Cultural Interest Asset spurred efforts to restore and consolidate the foundations of ruined monuments through public initiatives. An example is the San Francisco Convent, which underwent a meticulous restoration process from 1995 to 2011. The initial phases relied heavily on the work of the Nertóbriga Workshop Schools, which recovered the convent's lost cloister. The church was definitively restored through the efforts of the Ministry of Housing, which enabled the completion of the project's most costly phase, initiated by the local administration a decade earlier. The restored building now houses the Space for Young Creation, the Fregenal Contemporary Art Museum, and spaces for temporary exhibitions and social events. Another restored space is the San Ildefonso Convent and College of the Society of Jesus, whose restoration began in 2019 with funding from the Ministry of Development.

Among the major events in these years were the Centenary of the Canonical Coronation of Our Lady Saint Mary of the Remedies in 2006, coinciding with the Fifth Centenary of her proclamation as Fregenal's Patroness. The Patroness's arrival in the city became a nationally significant event, with the participation of the main state authorities, led by King Juan Carlos I, who delegated his representation to the President of the Government of Extremadura, Juan Carlos Rodríguez Ibarra.

In April 2010, HOY Fregenal was launched, the first digital communication medium in Fregenal, initiating the network of hyperlocal outlets for Diario de Extremadura HOY. The medium was directed for nine years by Juan Ignacio Márquez Martínez, a correspondent for the outlet in Fregenal and director of Televisión Fregenal. It published 135 paper issues, distributed monthly to Fregenal households. In covering Fregenal's social life, Juan Ignacio Márquez authored over 4,000 articles for this digital medium, in addition to more than 3,000 articles written over 28 years as the HOY correspondent for Fregenal de la Sierra. This legacy, along with his involvement in numerous civil society initiatives, such as presiding over the Fregenal Choir, the Friends of the Rosary of Sunday of Miracles Commission, and his role as Coordinator of the Coronation Centenary Celebrations, led to Juan Ignacio Márquez being posthumously named Favorite Son of Fregenal in 2022 by the municipal corporation.

Regarding Fregenal's economy, in 2010, MAFRESA's shareholding changed after Ángel del Cid sold 51% of the shares to the Jorge Group. The new management implemented improvements to the factory, maintaining and expanding its workforce to 250 employees. Production also increased significantly, reaching 142,000 pigs slaughtered in 2018 and expanding capacity to 200,000. MAFRESA remains the leading meat industry in Extremadura, with sales of 50 million euros in 2019.

== Heritage ==
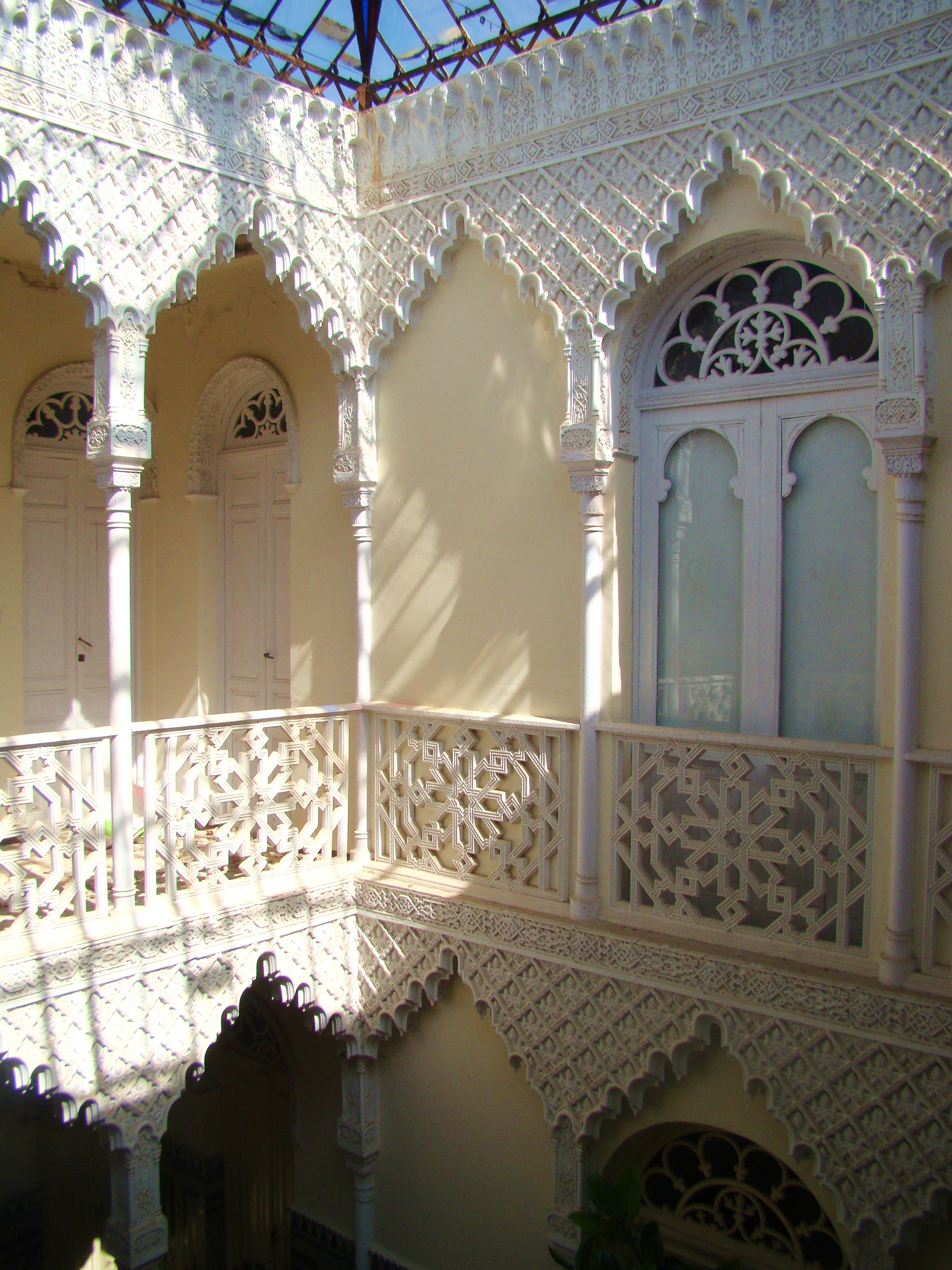
Neo-Mudéjar patio of the Peche Family manor house

Fregenal de la Sierra boasts a significant historic-artistic complex, declared a Cultural Interest Asset in 1991, making it one of the most important complexes in the south of the Province of Badajoz, featuring numerous monuments including churches, manor houses, the Templar castle, and more. The most prominent monument is the Templar Castle, likely built in the 13th century by the Knights of the Order of the Temple; however, following recent discoveries of Roman, Visigothic, and Muslim remains, it is believed the current castle is a reconstruction of an earlier one on the same site. Inside, there is the bullring, from the 18th century, funded by the Patronage of the Virgin of the Remedies, and rebuilt in the 20th century by a group of residents to whom the Town Council granted ownership of 50 boxes, as recorded in municipal records, and the market, from the 20th century, under the jurisdiction of the Fregenal Town Council. Attached to it are the Santa María Church, from the 13th century. This was expanded in the 17th century, preserving the high altar from the 18th century, and the parish house, built in the first half of the 20th century.

The Catholic parish churches are the Santa María de la Plaza Church, the Santa Catalina Martyr Church, and the Santa Ana Church, all belonging to the Archdiocese of Mérida-Badajoz.

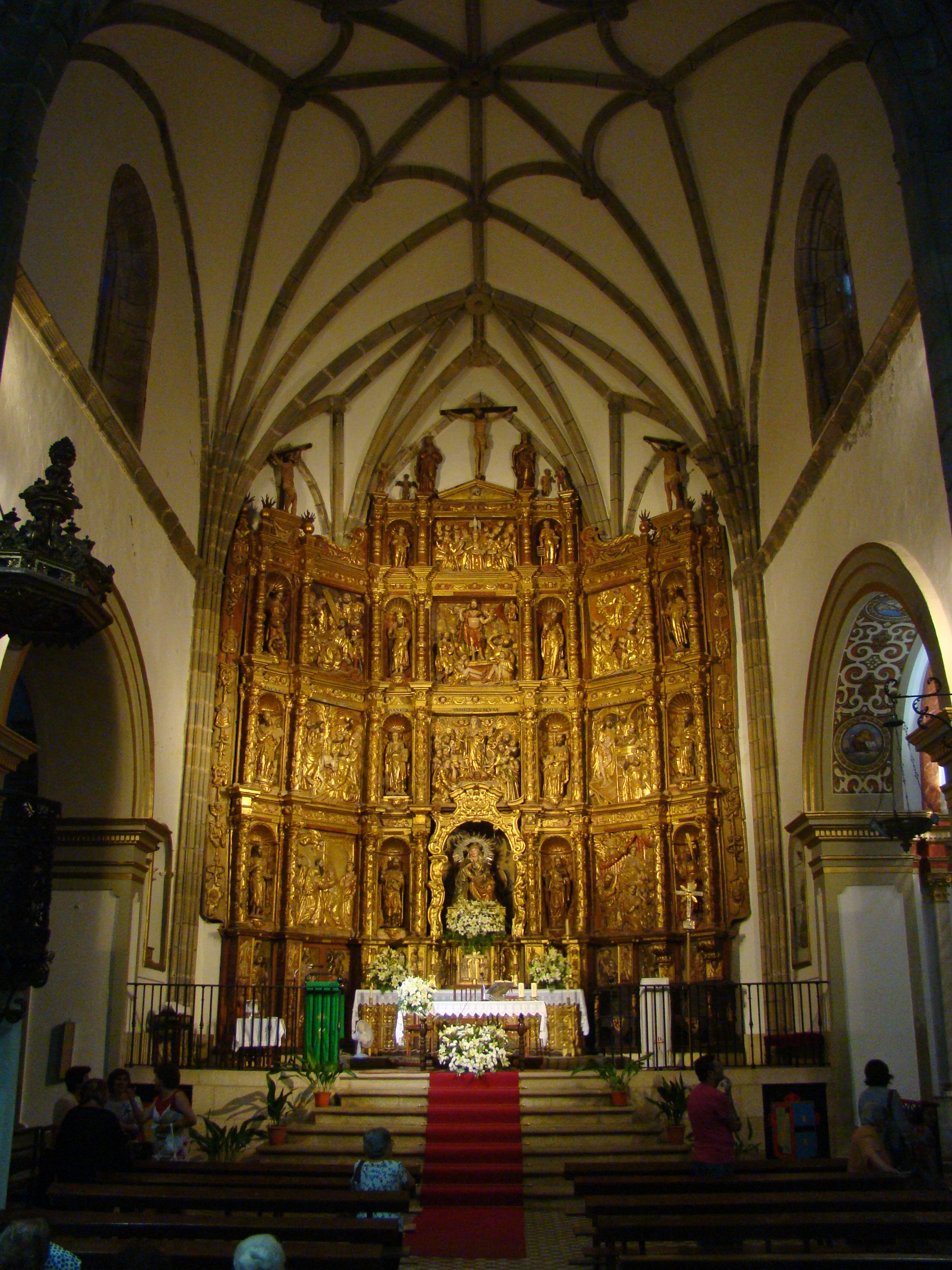
High altar and ribbed vault of the Santa Ana Church

In the Santa Ana neighborhood, surrounded by numerous manor houses such as the Palace of the Counts of Torrepilares, the Peche House, with its Neo-Mudéjar patio; the Palace of the Marquises of Riocabado, the Palace of the Marquises of Ferrera, and many other houses and palaces, stands the Santa Ana Church, the largest in the city, built in the 16th century with later renovations in the 18th century. It features a magnificent high altar from the 16th century, attributed by recent studies to the carver Antonio de Auñón, crafted in the 1570s. The same studies point to the artistic patronage of a group of New Christian origins in Fregenal de la Sierra, whose most dynamic sector, enriched by artisanal and commercial activities in prominent sectors like leather, initiated a process of social ascent to join local ruling groups. The high altar of the Santa Ana Church is considered by numerous authors as one of the most brilliant works of lower Extremadura at this time.

Also notable in the church are the Nativity altar, composed of polychrome images dated to the 17th century; or the sacrarium chapel, in Renaissance style, with a sacrarium of about 150 kilograms of silver, funded by the population, made of embossed and gilded sterling silver, enriched with enamels, pearls, and precious stones. In another of the church's chapels, Juan Bravo Murillo, an illustrious son of the city, is buried alongside his parents’ remains.

Another of the city's main churches, Santa Catalina, from the 15th century, features a Mudéjar ceiling from the 16th century and surprises visitors with a simple 17th century façade, consisting of a lintel door with a rectangular opening under an oculus and topped by a bell tower. The basilical plan temple houses the most important jewels of Fregenal's imagery, the Virgin with Child and the Pietà, both from the 15th century and attributed to Lorenzo Mercadante. These, along with the rest of the city's images and paintings, are the oldest within the heritage of this Lower Extremaduran city. Other notable elements of the historic complex include the San Francisco Convent, from the 16th century, recently restored after being abandoned at the end of the 19th century. The Convent of the Augustinian Nuns and the former Jesuit Convent and College, both funded by Alonso de Paz and built around the 16th century. Also noteworthy are the fountains of the Fontanilla, from the 16th century, crowned by the Virgin of the Guide, and the María Miguel Fountain, around which an ancient legend of impossible love between María and Miguel is woven.

Six kilometers from Fregenal lies the Sanctuary of Our Lady Saint Mary of the Remedies, from the late 15th century with expansions up to the 18th century. Architecturally, it adheres to Baroque canons, with its exterior featuring an atrium with a brick semicircular archway and smooth granite columns supporting a wooden roof. Inside, the richness of the chamber housing the statue of Our Lady Saint Mary of the Remedies, patroness of the city since 1506, stands out with its ornate Baroque decoration topped by a hemispherical dome. The building's high altar, recently restored in 2006, also reflects Baroque influence. The complex is completed by the Hostelry, a hall displaying portraits of Fregenal's most illustrious figures.

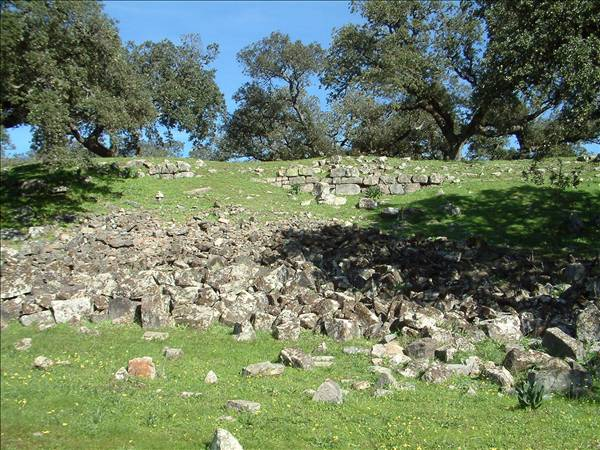
Remains of the walls of the city of Nertobriga Concordia Iulia

Equally notable is the archaeological site of Nertobriga Concordia Iulia, located within Fregenal's municipal boundaries and declared a Cultural Interest Asset in 2013 by the Government of Extremadura. Situated strategically between the Sillo and Álamo rivers, near the region's largest concentration of iron mines and along the Cañada Real Soriana Occidental, it was a crossroads of a significant protohistoric communication route between southern and northern Iberia, as revealed by spatial studies of prehistoric settlements. Excavations at the site, begun in the 19th century, have continued to the present, uncovering remains of the main buildings of the acropolis, forum, baths, market, necropolis, and cisterns, as well as sections of the city's ancient wall. Access to the site has been improved, and archaeological work continues, driven by its Cultural Interest Asset designation.

Lastly, the medieval hermitage of San Miguel de los Fresnos, located about six kilometers northeast of the urban center, has its oldest architectural elements dated to the 7th century, within the Visigothic period. Currently, the perimeter walls of its single nave, covered by two pointed ribbed arches supported by columns attached to the interior and buttresses on the exterior, a lateral entrance in the same style facing south, and an apse closed with a barrel vault housing a small altar with a central niche and shell, from the 16th and 17th centuries, flanked by two smaller ones, are preserved. According to all indications, it housed a polychrome and gilded terracotta image of the Archangel Saint Michael, a work from the second half of the 15th century attributed to the Breton sculptor Lorenzo Mercadante, deposited in the National Art Museum of Catalonia. Due to its high historical value and to preserve the architectural remains that have survived, this hermitage has been included in the Inventory of Historical and Cultural Heritage of Extremadura by the Department of Culture, Tourism, and Sports.

== Economy ==
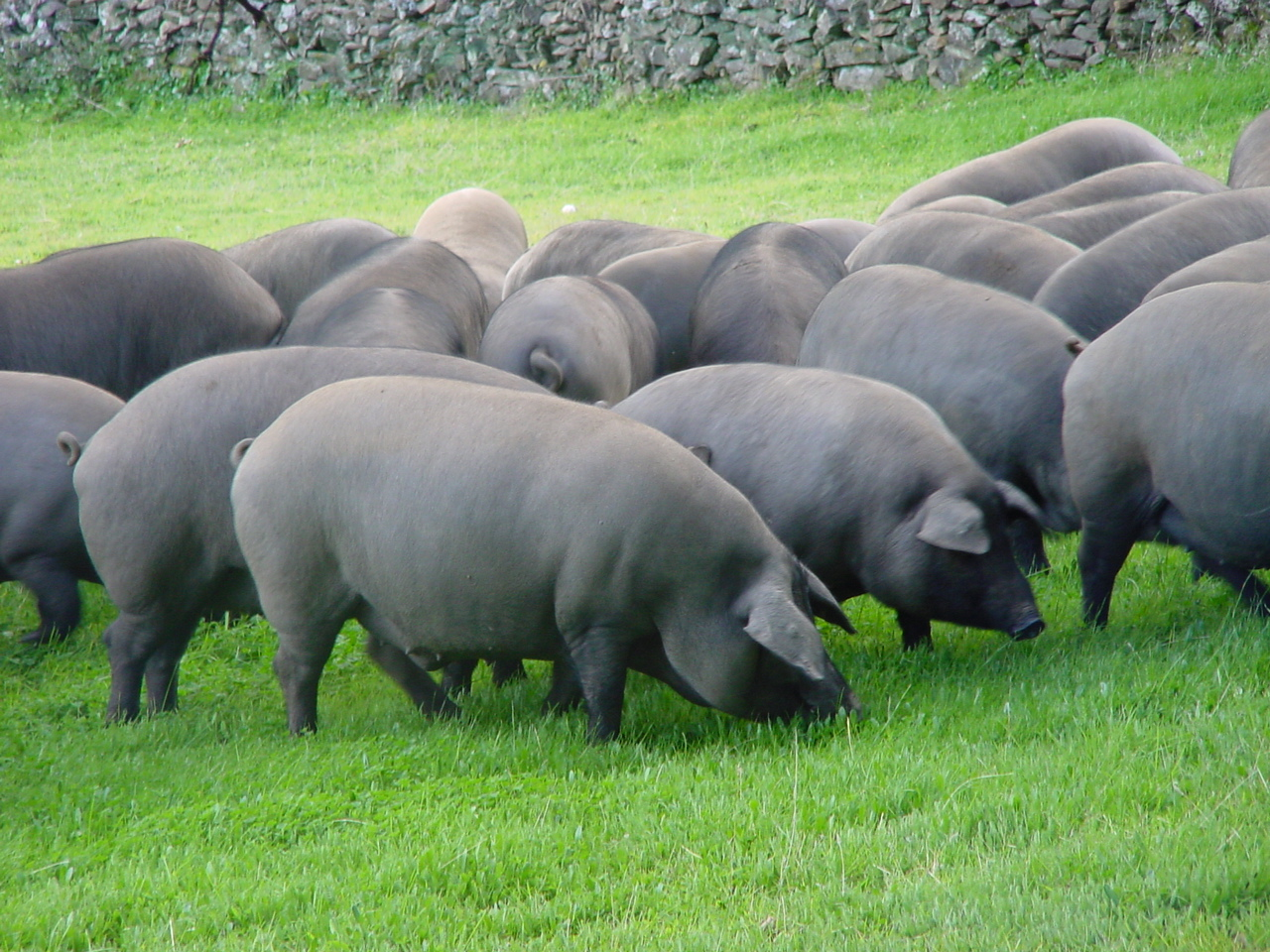
Pigs grazing in the dehesas of Fregenal

The economy of Fregenal de la Sierra, as well as its surroundings, has traditionally depended on agriculture and livestock. To a lesser extent, mining played a role, with an area of influence over towns such as Jerez de los Caballeros or Fuente de Cantos in Extremadura, and Cala in the Province of Huelva. Fregenal served as a central distribution point for the region's mining resources, facilitated by the railway line passing through it.

Currently, the most significant activity is the service sector, employing nearly 50% of Fregenal's active population, a reference sector in the region with deep historical roots due to the commercial routes passing through Fregenal.

The emerging tourism activity leverages the city's artistic and cultural legacy. Its monumental heritage was declared a Cultural Interest Asset in 1991. Various cultural associations in the town play a significant role in preserving its folklore and traditions. The rich natural environment, with extensive dehesas and a network of approved trails, brings visitors closer to rural life through activities that are eco-friendly.

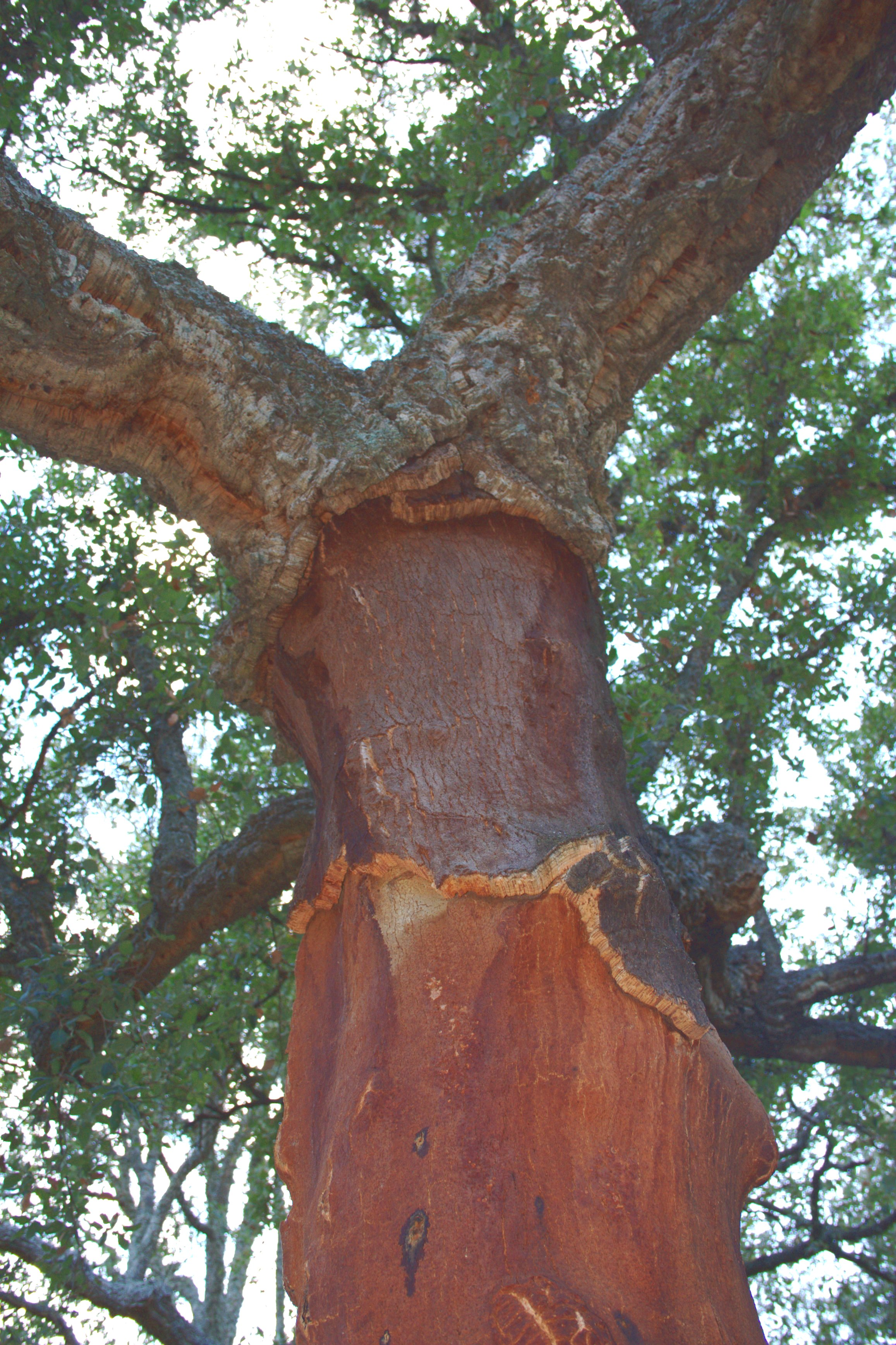
Cork oak tree in Fregenal

Fregenal also features artisanal activities such as pottery. Closely tied to tradition and inherited from ancient workshops near El Puerto and Mazaderos streets, Fregenal's potters preserve their families’ legacy in clay and earthenware production. The Gallardo family, for example, continues this tradition in their workshop. The work of Rafael Ortega Porras, who received the Medal of Extremadura in 1998, was instrumental in preserving this artistic expression, achieving recognized national and international success, bringing his original pottery and the name of Fregenal and Extremadura to many parts of the world.

Although limited, commercial activity is notable in the city center, with numerous shops around Cárcel, Reyes Huertas, Italia, and Calles Nuevas streets, as well as the main artery, España Avenue. These form a significant commercial network through the Fregenal Merchants Association (Acofrex), which conducts numerous advertising campaigns, especially during the Christmas season.

The extraction of cork is also significant, with many local companies, such as RANECOR, annually harvesting bark from the numerous cork oaks surrounding the town, providing substantial employment to both local residents and others from the region during the harvest season.

Above all economic activities, those related to the Iberian pig stand out, with locally significant industries such as Hermanos García-Hermoso or the Montanera Fregenal cooperative, and nationally and internationally recognized companies such as Argal, with one of Fregenal's most important slaughterhouses, the only one in the company dedicated to Iberian products; and MAFRESA (Matadero Frexnense S.A.), considered the city's most important company and the largest Iberian agrofood company in Extremadura. It has the largest facilities of any Fregenal company and the largest workforce in the city.

== Demography ==
Fregenal de la Sierra has a population of 4,743 inhabitants (INE 2024).

Graph showing the demographic evolution of Fregenal de la Sierra between 1842 and 2021
Year	Pop.	±%
1842	4,620	—
1857	6,948	+50.4%
1860	6,528	−6.0%
1877	7,514	+15.1%
1887	8,287	+10.3%
1897	7,733	−6.7%
1900	9,582	+23.9%
1910	10,415	+8.7%
1920	10,792	+3.6%
1930	10,299	−4.6%
1940	10,951	+6.3%
1950	12,050	+10.0%
1960	10,537	−12.6%
1970	8,188	−22.3%
1981	5,788	−29.3%
1991	5,585	−3.5%
2001	5,308	−5.0%
2011	5,157	−2.8%
2021	4,821	−6.5%
Source: De jure population according to the population censuses of the INE. De facto population according to the population censuses of the INE. In this census, it was called Fregenal: 1842.

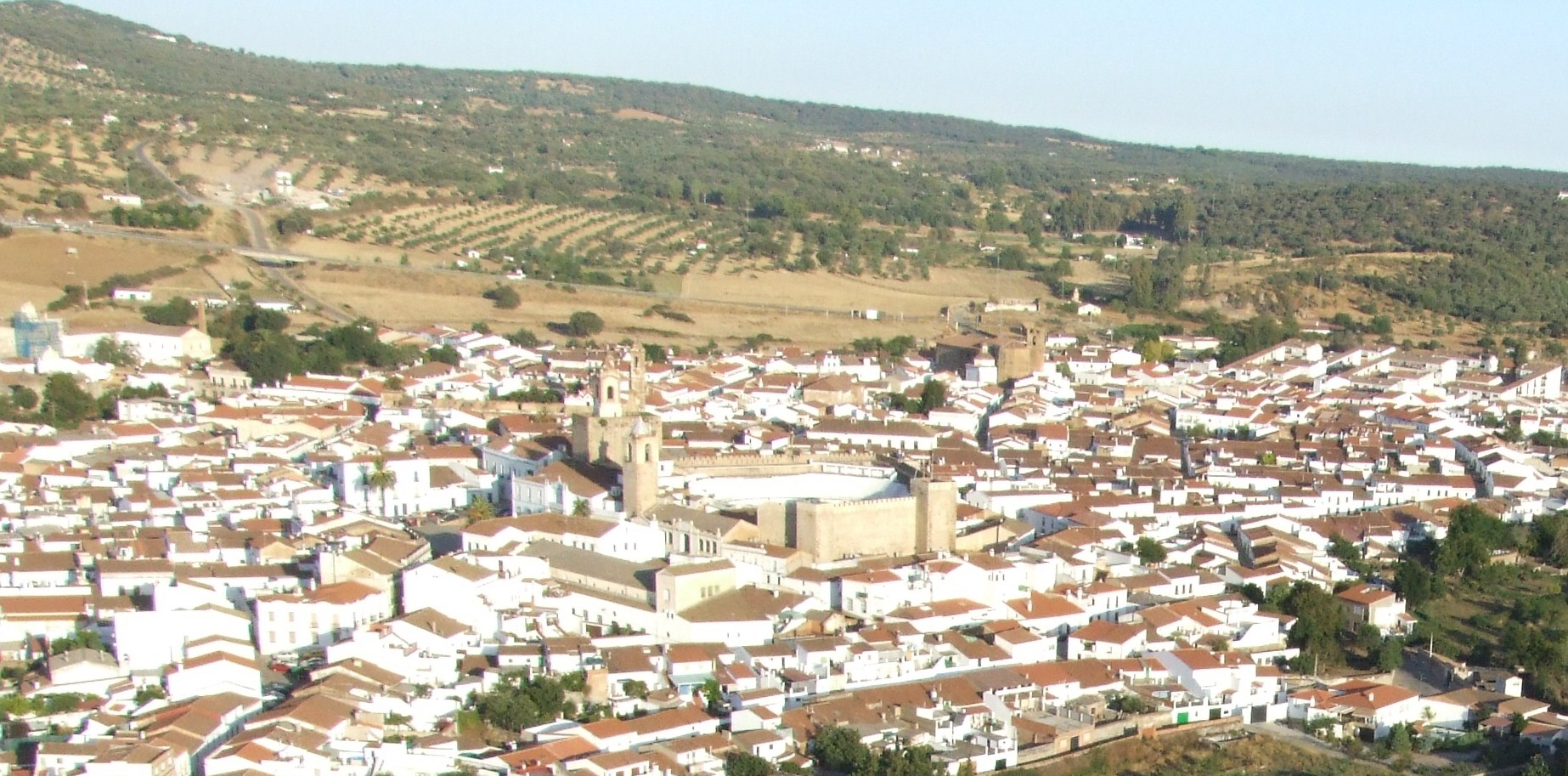
Aerial view of the northern part of Fregenal de la Sierra

Fregenal de la Sierra is characterized, both currently and throughout the 19th and 20th centuries, as the most populated locality in the judicial district it heads and the region it forms. During the 19th century, the population saw an incipient increase from mid-century, supported by improvements in fields such as healthcare and medicine, as well as the establishment of new companies with the industrial revolution. The century ended with a very high population, exceeding 9,500 inhabitants. This growth was bolstered by the introduction of significant services in the city, such as the opening of the railway line in 1889.

Regarding its evolution throughout the last century, the population significantly declined during the second half. The city was highly populated during the first half, reaching 10,000 inhabitants, maintained until the 1950s when it peaked.

From the 1960s onward, the population of Fregenal de la Sierra was directly affected by the rural exodus, a demographic phenomenon that similarly impacted other towns in the region and, more broadly, southern Spain, including the autonomous communities of Extremadura and Andalusia. This rural migration led to the loss of a significant portion of the population, primarily younger individuals, who moved to major national capitals in search of employment due to a stagnant agricultural sector dominated by large estates and unable to absorb the available workforce. The lack of industrial sectors, which remain scarce in the region to this day, also contributed to this phenomenon. From the 1960s to the present, the local population has steadily declined, with the most significant reductions occurring during the 1960s and 1970s, when Fregenal's population was halved. As a result, a large number of Fregenal emigrants can now be found in communities such as Madrid, Catalonia, or the Basque Country.

The lack of employment opportunities remains one of Fregenal's main challenges. Despite the establishment of new businesses in the 1980s and 1990s that revitalized the local economy, the introduction of heavy industry initially, followed by agribusiness, did not fully resolve the situation. However, these industries did manage to curb the severe depopulation that Fregenal faced just before the advent of democracy. The introduction of various public services and improvements in education and healthcare have also contributed to stabilizing the population. In recent years, following the economic crisis of 2008-2015, the population has once again faced a sharp decline, with a loss of over 300 residents between 2010 and 2019, reaching the lowest population level since the mid-19th century. Currently, one of the municipal government's main objectives is to restore the population to 5,000 inhabitants, a challenging goal given the loss of numerous jobs, an aging population, and the continued outmigration of young people seeking opportunities elsewhere in Spain and Europe. Although municipal registry data showed some stability between 2017 and 2018, the registry data as of 1 January 2020 again reflected a decline in the number of registered residents. Despite a slight increase in registered residents during the COVID-19 crisis due to the nationwide lockdown, figures from February 2021 confirmed a continued downward trend in population below 2020 levels.

== Administration and politics ==
The town is governed by the Fregenal de la Sierra Town Council, whose representatives are elected every four years through universal suffrage by all citizens over 18 years of age. The Fregenal municipal council consists of eleven councilors, among whom the mayor-president is appointed. The Town Council of Fregenal has been led by Mayor María Agustina Rodríguez since taking office on 13 June 2015.

List of mayors since the democratic elections of 1979
Period	Mayor	Party
1979-1983	Francisco Rodríguez Romero	Union of the Democratic Centre
1983-1999	Luis Moreno Gamito	Spanish Socialist Workers' Party
1999-2003	Matías Reviriego Marqués	People's Party
2003-2015	Juan Francisco Ceballos Fabián	Spanish Socialist Workers' Party
2015-present	María Agustina Rodríguez Martínez	People's Party

Elections in Fregenal have been held periodically and uninterruptedly since 1979. The town is divided into three electoral districts.

Results of municipal elections in Fregenal de la Sierra
Political party	2023			2019			2015			2011			2007			2003			1999			1995			1991			1987			1983			1979		
Political party	%	Votes	Councilors	%	Votes	Councilors	%	Votes	Councilors	%	Votes	Councilors	%	Votes	Councilors	%	Votes	Councilors	%	Votes	Councilors	%	Votes	Councilors	%	Votes	Councilors	%	Votes	Councilors	%	Votes	Councilors	%	Votes	Councilors
PP-AP	55.57	1656	6	53.02	1658	6	52.07	1707	7	45.11	1604	6	43.54	1548	6	36.53	1299	5	53.81	1968	7	37.70	1359	5	33.07	1141	4	35.68	1222	5	38.87	1281	5	–	–	–
PSOE	42.41	1264	5	39.71	1242	5	37.49	1229	5	45.56	1620	6	45.60	1621	6	53.15	1890	7	34.02	personally identifiable information removed	5	46.99	1694	6	54.23	1871	8	55.27	1893	7	55.55	1831	8	42.27	1373	6
IU-PCE	–	–	–	6.26	196	0	9.09	298	1	7.79	277	1	9.20	327	1	9.17	326	1	11.59	424	1	14.37	518	2	8.46	292	1	8.53	292	1	5.58	184	0	2.62	85	0
UCD	–	–	–	–	–	–	–	–	–	–	–	–	–	–	–	–	–	–	–	–	–	–	–	–	–	–	–	–	–	–	–	–	–	52.31	1699	7
Independents	–	–	–	–	–	–	–	–	–	–	–	–	–	–	–	–	–	–	–	–	–	–	–	–	3.07	106	0	–	–	–	–	–	–	–	–	–
Workers' Party of Spain (PTE)	–	–	–	–	–	–	–	–	–	–	–	–	–	–	–	–	–	–	–	–	–	–	–	–	–	–	–	–	–	–	–	–	–	2.80	91	0

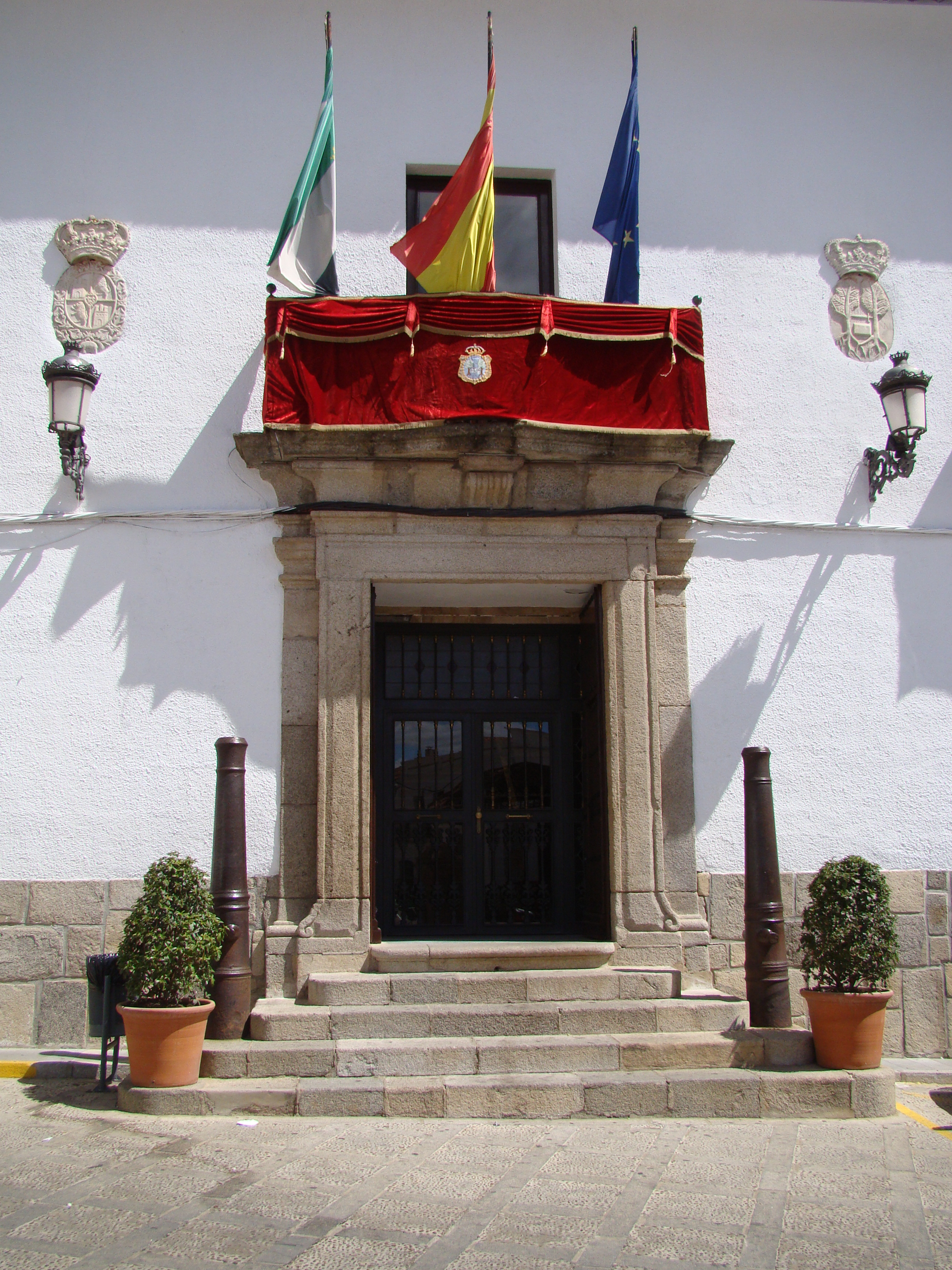
Town Hall of Fregenal de la Sierra

The 2023-2027 municipal council of Fregenal de la Sierra consists of the following councilors:

People's Party (PP)

- María Agustina Rodríguez Martínez, Mayor-President
- Mercedes Linares Rastrojo, Spokesperson for the People's Party Group and Councilor for Tourism, Housing, Employment, Industrial and Commercial Development, and Urban Planning
- María Isabel Reviriego Romero, Deputy Spokesperson for the People's Party Group and Councilor for Sports, Social Affairs, Youth, and Education
- Gonzalo Álvarez Gómez, Councilor for Festivities, Public Works, Roads, and Street Cleaning
- Eloy Díaz Giraldo, Councilor for Parks, Gardens, and Cemeteries
- Esperanza Vega Pereira, Councilor for Culture, Seniors, and Equality

Spanish Socialist Workers' Party (PSOE)

- María José Serrano Rastrojo, Spokesperson for the Socialist Group
- Rafael Calzado Romero, Deputy Spokesperson for the Socialist Group
- Manuela Caballero Zapata
- Ángel Romero Romero
- Antonio Romero García

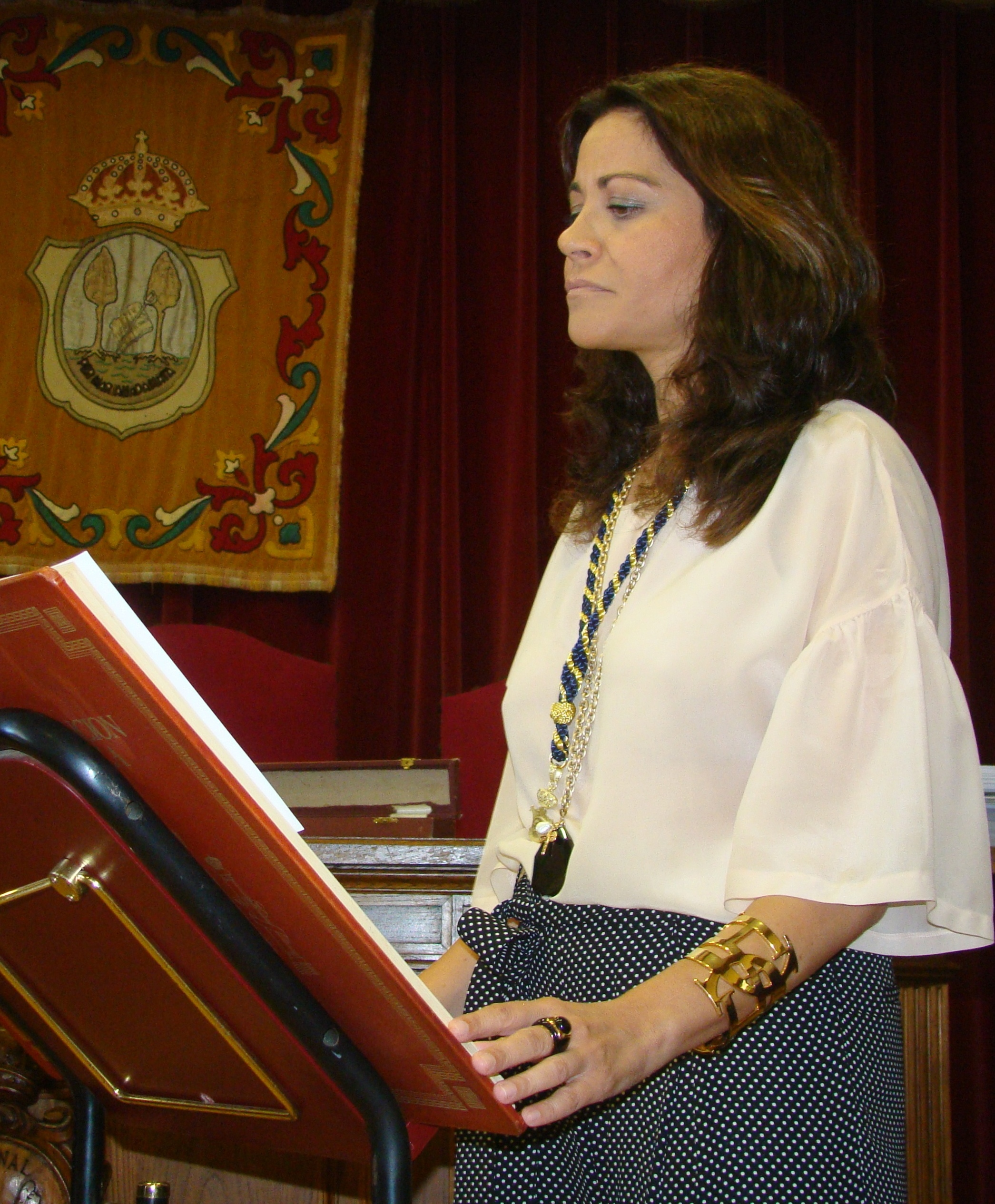
María Agustina Rodríguez, Mayor

The first local elections held in Fregenal took place in 1979. The first mayor elected in the democratic era was Francisco Rodríguez Romero of the UCD, who served for one term.

Following the 1983 elections, Luis Moreno Gamito of the PSOE was appointed mayor of Fregenal, renewing his mandate three times and governing for four terms.

In the 1999 elections, after four socialist terms, Matías Reviriego Marqués of the PP won the elections and was elected mayor of Fregenal for one term.

Subsequently, in the 2003 elections, the PSOE returned to local government, with Juan Francisco Ceballos Fabián as mayor, who renewed his mandate twice and governed for three terms.

Following the 2015 elections, the position of mayor passed to María Agustina Rodríguez of the PP. This marked the first time a woman led the Fregenal municipal council. This situation continued after the 2019 and 2023 municipal elections, with Rodríguez serving as mayor for a third consecutive term with an absolute majority.

== Services ==
=== Education ===
Education in Fregenal de la Sierra is managed by the Department of Education of the Government of Extremadura, which oversees educational responsibilities at the regional level. Fregenal has four educational institutions:

Los Juncos Nursery School

This center provides care for children aged 0 to 3 years. It is located next to the IES Eugenio Hermoso on Avenida de España and is the most recently established educational facility, offering services for most of the year.

San Francisco de Asís Public School

Located in the Santa Ana neighborhood, this school offers preschool and primary education, covering ages 3 to 12. The school participates in various European projects through exchanges with schools across Europe.

Arias Montano Public School

The oldest educational institution in Fregenal, also known as "Los Escolares" among older residents, is named after the renowned humanist and scholar Benito Arias Montano, one of Fregenal's most distinguished historical figures. It provides education from preschool to primary levels.

Eugenio Hermoso Secondary School

This is the main educational institution in the town, offering compulsory secondary education and baccalaureate programs to students from Fregenal de la Sierra, Higuera la Real, and other towns in the region, as well as the judicial district and even some villages in northern Huelva province, such as Hinojales, Cumbres Mayores, Cumbres de San Bartolomé, and Encinasola. The school also offers vocational training programs in electricity, administration, and management, as well as a distance learning university for adults. Named after the prominent Fregenal painter Eugenio Hermoso Martínez, one of Extremadura's leading 20th century artists, the school also houses an extensive library with a large collection of research and literary books available to students and the public. Additionally, the school displays various award-winning paintings from the Eugenio Hermoso International Painting Prize in its two buildings.

=== Transport ===
Fregenal currently has numerous transport services connecting the Extremaduran town with various cities in Extremadura, Andalusia, and the rest of Spain.

==== Bus ====
Fregenal has a bus station linking the town with various cities across Spain, including Seville, Badajoz, Huelva, Ayamonte, Zafra, Mérida, Madrid, Zaragoza, and Barcelona, with daily and weekly schedules for each destination.

==== Train ====
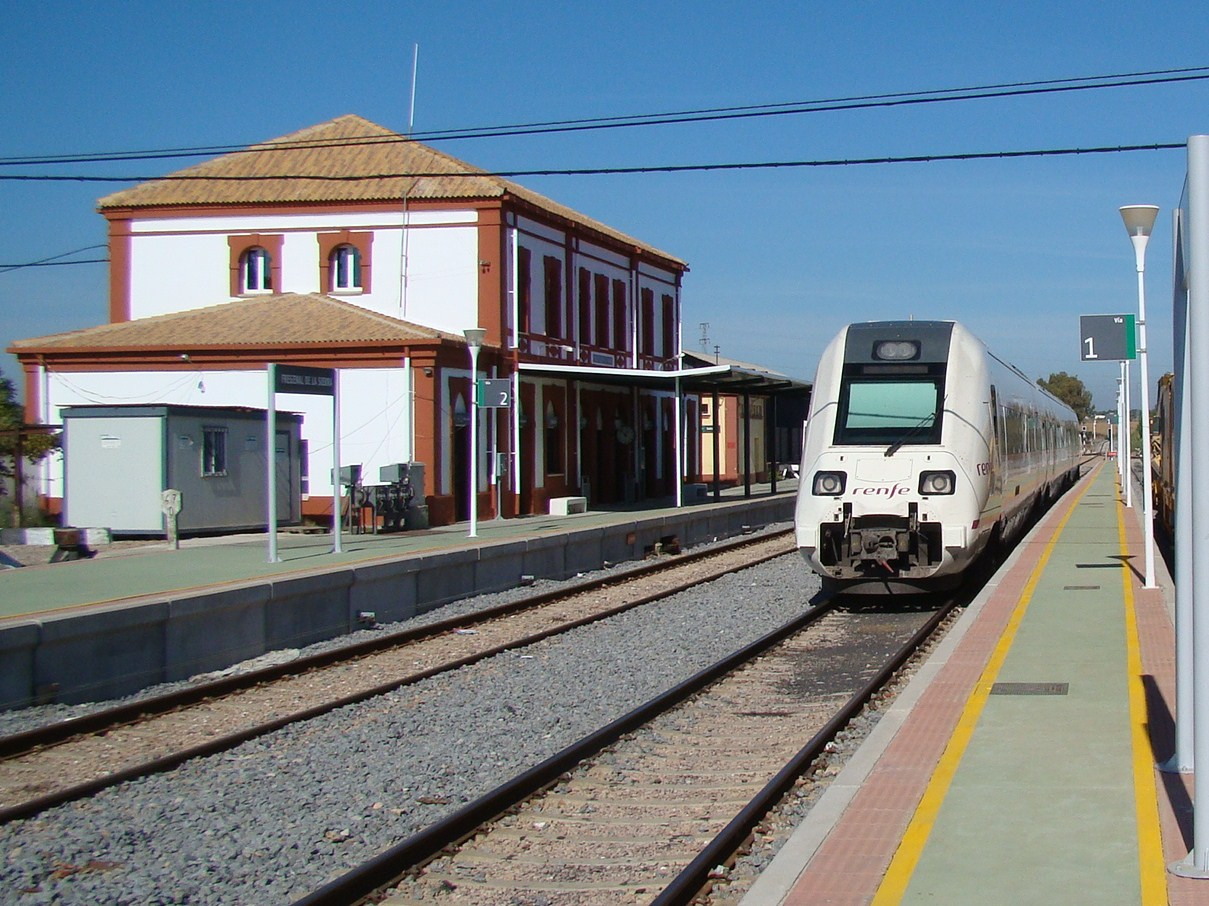
Railway station in Fregenal

A railway line runs through Fregenal, connecting the town with Huelva, Zafra, and other Extremaduran cities such as Mérida, Cáceres, and Plasencia, as well as Madrid's Atocha station via trains linking the Spanish capital with Huelva. The line currently accommodates numerous passenger and freight trains at various times of the day. It is the only railway line that passes through the comarca of Tentudía.

==== Roads ====
Given its geographical proximity to provinces such as Huelva and Seville, Fregenal de la Sierra is served by several roads connecting the town with the rest of Spain.

Identifier	Name	Route
N-435	Badajoz-Huelva Road	Connects Badajoz with Huelva through the Huelva mountains. Due to its importance in linking Extremadura with the Costa de la Luz, plans have been proposed to convert this national road into a highway between Zafra and Huelva.
EX-201	Fregenal de la Sierra-Huelva Province Border Road	Connects Fregenal with the Huelva province border, and thus with Santa Olalla del Cala and Seville, via the A-66.
EX-101	Fregenal de la Sierra-Los Santos de Maimona Road	Connects Fregenal with Zafra and Los Santos de Maimona, and with the rest of Spain and Madrid via the A-66 and A-5.
BA-065	Fregenal de la Sierra-Nuestra Señora de los Remedios Sanctuary Road	Connects with the Nuestra Señora de los Remedios Sanctuary, six kilometers from the town.

== Culture ==
=== Music and folklore ===
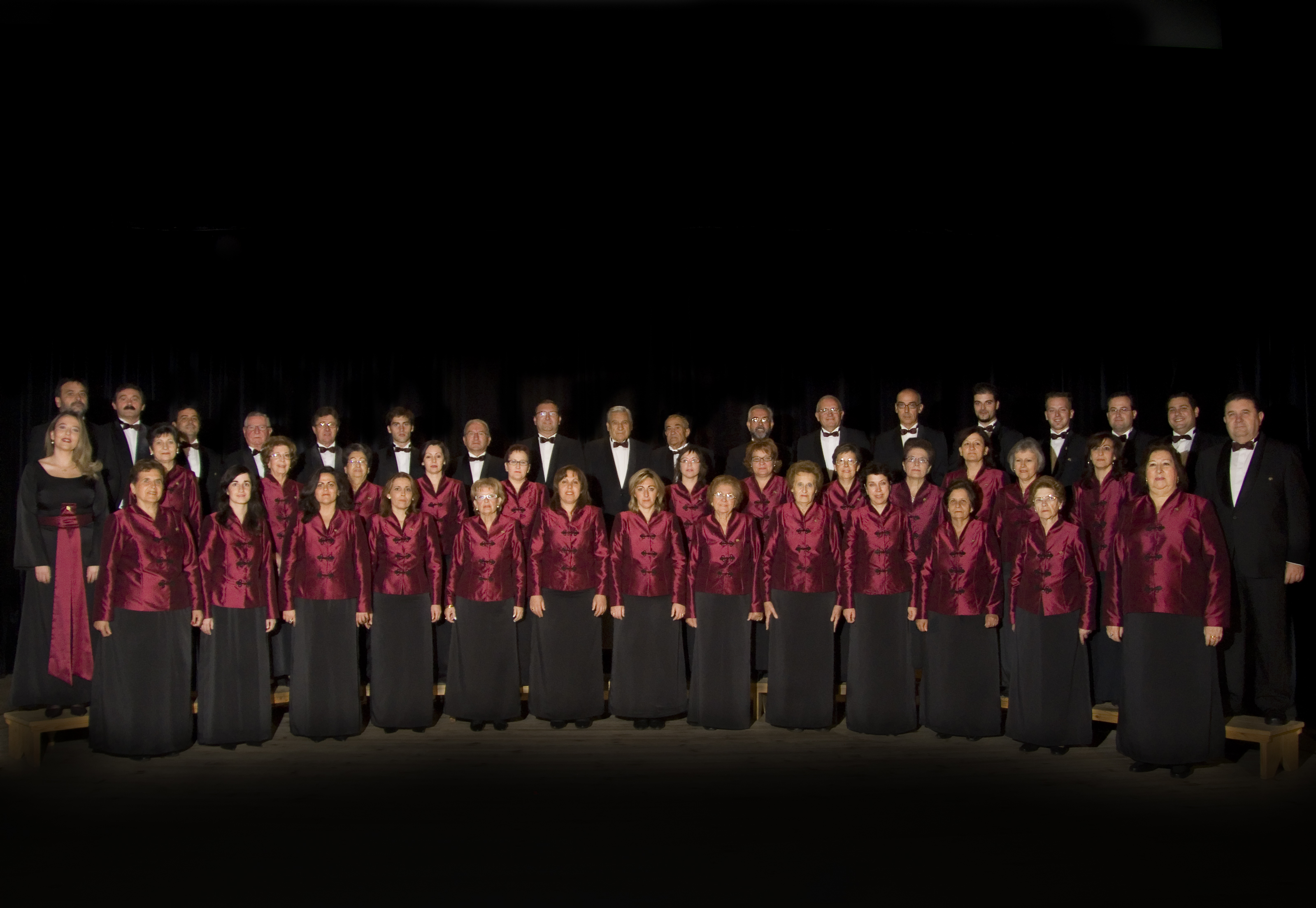
Coral Frexnense

Among the musical groups, the Coral Frexnense stands out, founded in 1968 with forty mixed voices performing classical, popular, religious, and Christmas polyphonies. It has a significant national presence, having performed across nearly all of Spain and Extremadura, as well as internationally. Its repertoire includes the largest collection of Fregenal folklore, performed during the patronal festivals in honor of the Virgin of Los Remedios and the San Mateo Fair and Festivals.

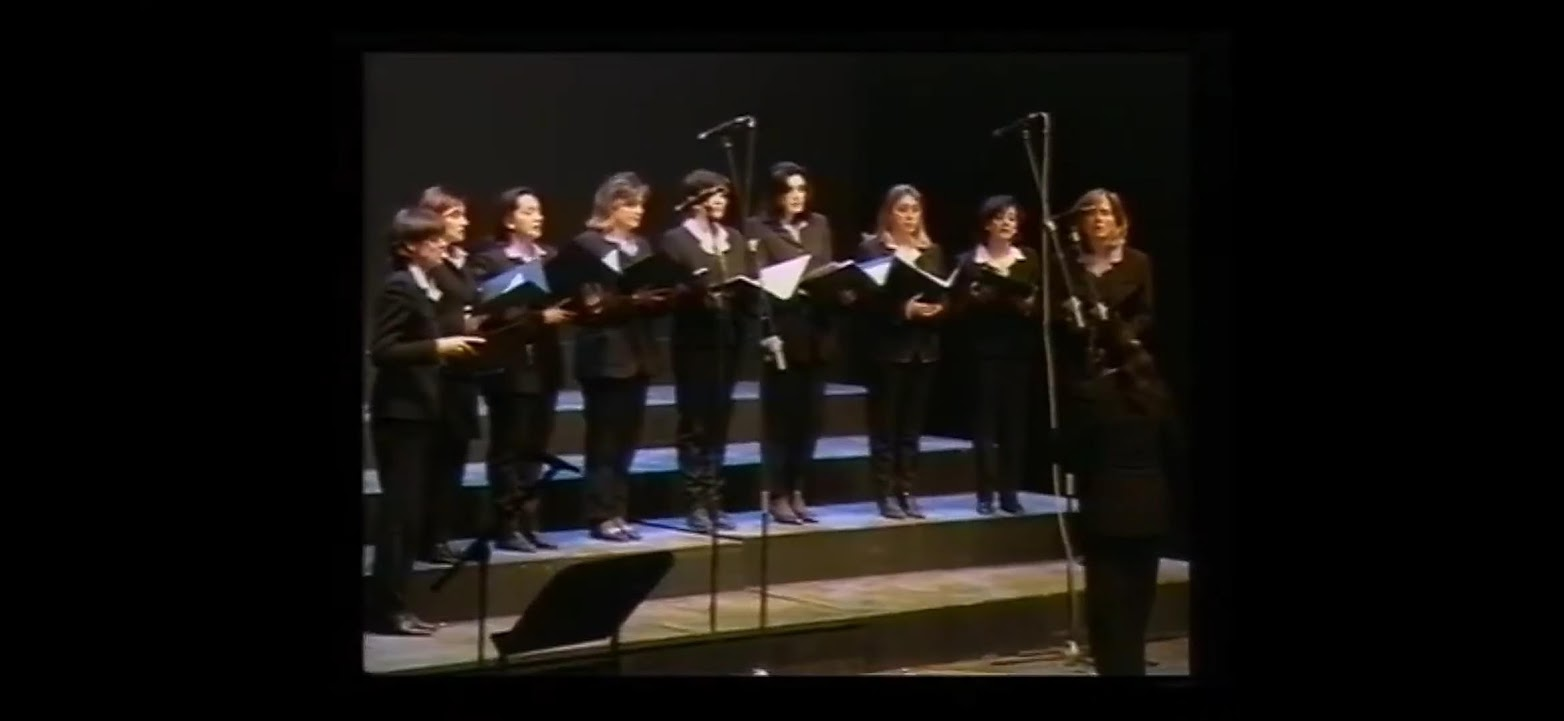
Coro de Cámara Amadeus de Fregenal de la Sierra

The Amadeus Chamber Choir of Fregenal is a group of female voices, trained in polyphonic singing since childhood, who have been singing in concerts and religious celebrations since 1996. Its members belonged to the Escolania Frexnense (1975-1980)

The Los Jateros Folk Group, founded in 1965, is a folk group of musicians and dancers representing Extremaduran and Fregenal traditions, with a prominent role in the patronal festivals. It has organized the International Sierra Festival since its inception in 1981 as the Extremadura Folk Dances and Songs Festival.

The Fregenal de la Sierra Musical Cultural Association is a group of brass and percussion musicians performing popular pieces, typically present at patronal festivals and bullfighting events. The Fregenal Cornets and Drums Band is a group of percussion and wind musicians who perform popular pieces during the town's main festivals. The band also organizes an annual gathering.

The Danzaores de la Virgen de la Salud are part of the Virgen de la Salud Brotherhood. This group features a centuries-old, captivating ritual dance performed by dancers and musicians with drums and bagpipes during the Virgen de la Salud festival. The Dance and Festival of the Virgen de la Salud were declared a Bien de Interés Cultural in 2017.

=== Academia ===
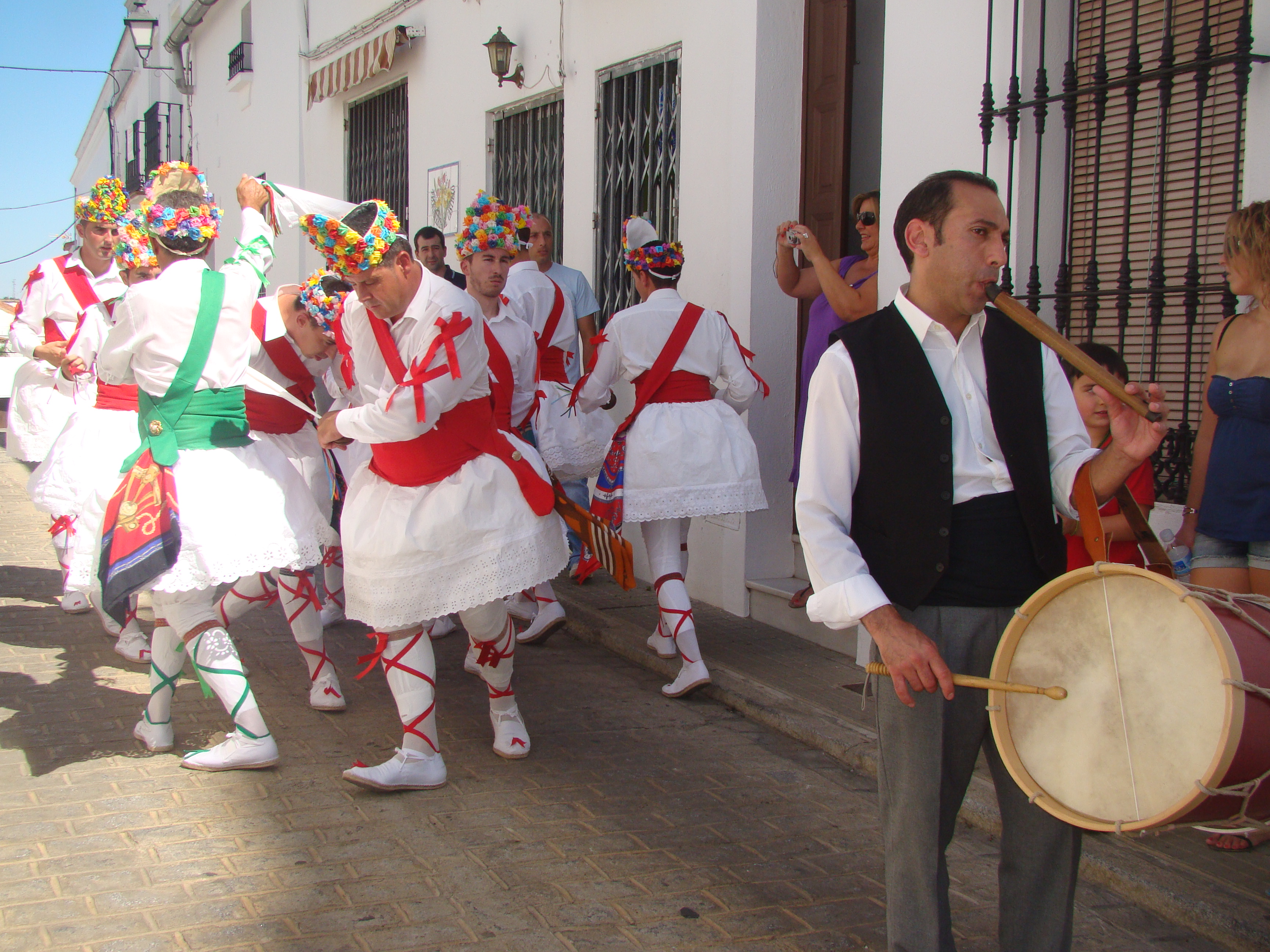
Dancers of the Virgin of Health

Fregenal's cultural life includes several academic events aimed at promoting research and knowledge transfer in rural settings. The Ritual Dances Research Conference, established in 1986 as part of the Extremadura Folk Dances and Songs Festival, has continued biennially under the Virgen de la Salud Brotherhood. Hundreds of folklorists and anthropologists have contributed to cataloging and preserving ritual dances from across Spain. The Fregenal People's Athenaeum, a cultural and academic organization founded in 2017, hosts experts throughout the year to give talks on culture, sports, literature, politics, ecology, healthcare, or education.

The Montana Society is an organization created to promote the legacy of the humanist Benito Arias Montano through academic and cultural activities in Fregenal de la Sierra. Since 2021, it has organized the international summer course “Arias Montano: Humanism in a Multidisciplinary Perspective for the 21st century,” in collaboration with the University of Extremadura. This event brings together researchers and specialists from universities and research centers worldwide, addressing humanism from a comprehensive, multidisciplinary perspective that includes traditional disciplines such as philosophy, literature, and history, as well as scientific and technical fields such as medicine, physics, and technology, fostering a rich dialogue on the relevance and application of humanist thought in the 21st century. Alongside academic activities, the course includes a cultural program with concerts, exhibitions, and other initiatives to engage the local community and highlight Arias Montano's legacy. The Montana Society also promotes projects such as the creation of the Arias Montano European Humanism Center, to be located in the historic Convent of San Francisco, aiming to establish Fregenal de la Sierra as an international reference for humanistic studies and a hub for cultural and academic activities of global significance.

=== Art ===
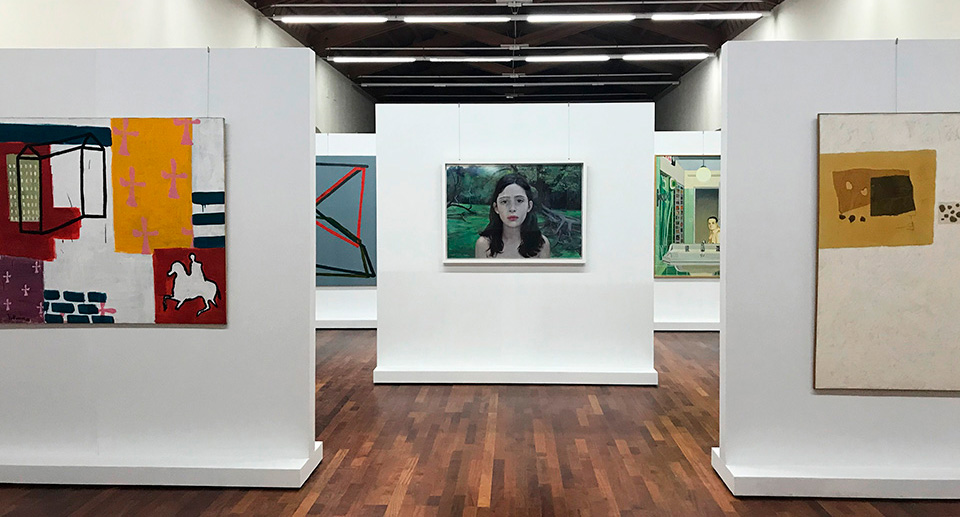
Award-winning works from the Eugenio Hermoso International Painting Prize

The Eugenio Hermoso International Painting Prize, established in 1981, is Spain's oldest painting competition and holds significant importance in Extremadura. Organized annually by the Fregenal Town Council, the Badajoz Provincial Council, and the Extremadura Department of Culture and Tourism, the jury's decision is announced in April or May, coinciding with the patronal festivals. The jury is chaired by Manuel Parralo Dorado, emeritus professor and dean of the Faculty of Fine Arts at the Complutense University of Madrid, and has included prominent Spanish art figures such as Antonio López, Juan Manuel Bonet, and Tomás Paredes Romero. The competition aims to promote and disseminate art both nationally and internationally while maintaining its original commitment to supporting young artists who express themselves primarily through painting.

The Open-Air Painting Prize, established in 1973, has a local scope and over fifty years of history, serving as a foundation for many Fregenal children and youths to begin their artistic journeys. On its 50th anniversary, the Fregenal Town Council renamed the competition the José Vargas Lasso Painting Contest for Children and Youth, in recognition of one of its founding teachers. The Eugenio Hermoso Legacy Rosario Hermoso Foundation works to preserve and promote the legacy of the painter, disseminating his life and works and highlighting his significance as one of the most representative painters of the 20th century costumbrist movement.

=== Museums ===
==== Eugenio Hermoso House Museum ====
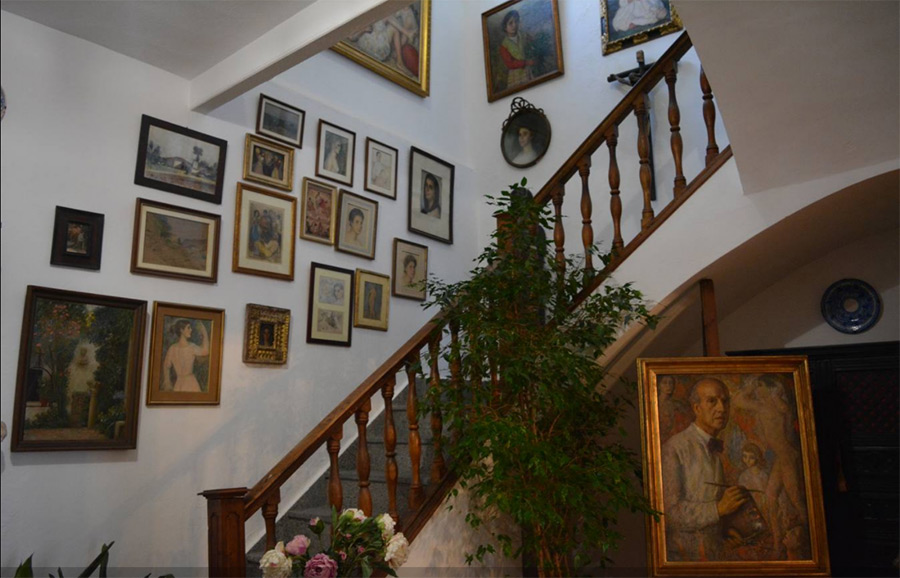
Eugenio Hermoso House Museum in 2018

The Eugenio Hermoso House Museum is a project to restore the former home of the local painter Eugenio Hermoso. The museum holds 240 works from the painter's personal catalog, as well as his painting tools, preserved in his original studio. The collection also includes an extensive set of sketches and drawings that will form part of the future museum's archive. After years of legal disputes, an agreement between the Badajoz Provincial Council, the Fregenal de la Sierra Town Council, and the Eugenio Hermoso Legacy Rosario Hermoso Foundation is expected to complete the museum's refurbishment by 2025, allowing the new museum space to open to the public.

==== Fregenal Contemporary Art Museum ====
The Fregenal Contemporary Art Museum, located in the Convent of San Francisco, opened to the public in February 2021 to display works acquired annually through the Eugenio Hermoso International Painting Prize, established in 1981. It houses over 130 works acquired through the competition, featuring artists such as Guillermo Silveira, José Carretero, Antonio Murado López, Hilario Bravo Maldonado, Leonor Solans García, Pilar Molinos, and Francisco Javier Fernández. The museum includes a permanent exhibition hall, a temporary exhibition hall, a workshop classroom, display panels, digital information about the works, and braille signage.

==== Caserón de las Miniaturas ====
Located on Santa Clara Street in Fregenal de la Sierra, the permanent exhibition Caserón de las Miniaturas features a private collection of miniature houses and dioramas created by local artist Encarna Caso. The exhibition includes up to twenty houses and dioramas in 1:12 and 1:24 scales, built over the past two decades. The pieces are displayed in two rooms of a historic manor house from the 16th and 17th centuries, featuring an emblazoned facade and typical stone doorway. After years of neglect, the building is gradually being revitalized through this exhibition and various activities planned by the Cultural Association established in 2020.

=== Festivals ===
Fregenal hosts the following festivals:

==== Holy Week ====
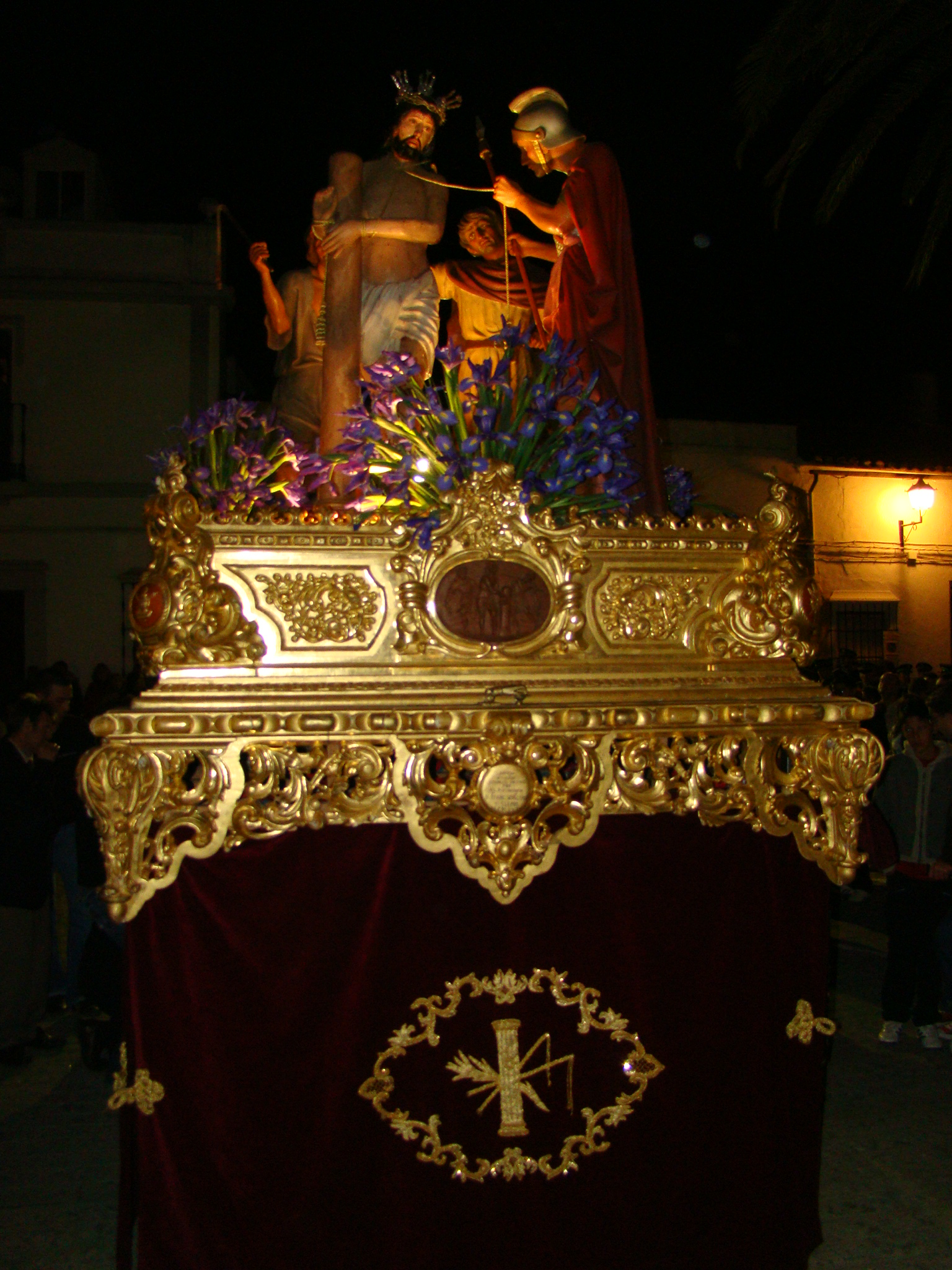
Main float of the Brotherhood of Our Father Jesus Tied to the Column, popularly known as Los Judíos

The silhouette of penitents, the pervasive scent of incense, the dim light of candles, and an atmosphere of solemn reverence fill the streets of Fregenal de la Sierra during Holy Week celebrations. The town showcases a rich collection of Fregenal religious imagery, most of which is recognized for its artistic significance. Among the pieces, the Virgin of Anguish, dating back to the 15th century, attributed to Lorenzo Mercadante, stands out as the oldest. Deeply rooted in Seville's sacred traditions, Fregenal's Holy Week commemorates the passion and death of Jesus Christ with restraint and profound respect for the Virgin Mary.

The celebration culminates with the Resurrection festivities, marked by a unique tradition involving the characters of Saint John and Mary Magdalene. Both figures hasten to announce to the Mother that Jesus has risen. The joy of the children accompanying the disciples encourages Mary to leave her refuge with the Augustinian Mothers, reuniting her with her Son to joyfully process through the streets of the Santa Ana neighborhood.

Fregenal's Holy Week begins with the Holy Week Proclamation, held on Passion Saturday at the Nuestra Señora de la Paz convent church, organized by the Board of Penitential Brotherhoods. The Board of Brotherhoods coordinates the worship, processions, and events of the five brotherhoods and confraternities that comprise it: the Brotherhood of Our Father Jesus Tied to the Column and María Santísima del Refugio, the Brotherhood of Our Father Jesus the Nazarene and María Santísima del Mayor Dolor, the Brotherhood of the Holy Christ of Forgiveness and Our Lady of Anguish, the Brotherhood of the Holy Virgin of Solitude, and the Brotherhood of the Lord of the Afflicted and Jesus Resurrected. These groups lead the processions from Ash Wednesday to Easter Sunday.

==== Patronal festivals of the Virgin of Los Remedios ====
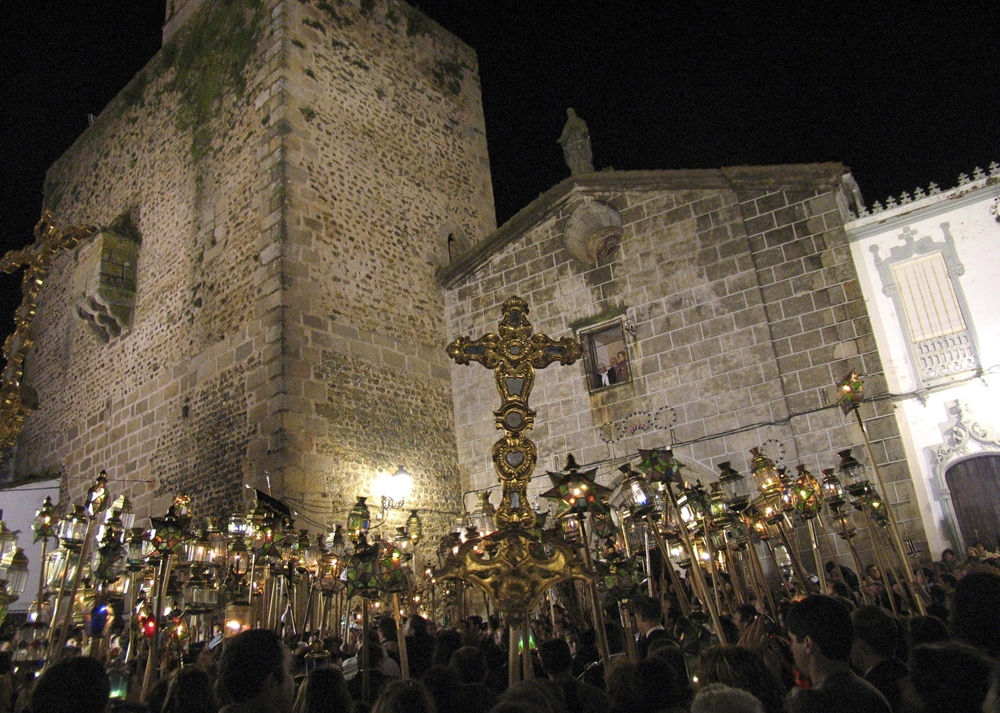
Apotheosis of the Sunday of Miracles Rosary

The patronal festivals of the Virgin of Los Remedios, the patroness of Fregenal, are celebrated annually in the Extremaduran town. For nearly a week, a series of solemn religious events take place, with the novena to Our Lady being a highlight. Key dates in the Fregenal calendar are marked by religious services, including the Sunday of Miracles, the eve of the Virgin of Los Remedios Feast, the feast day itself, and the Octave, celebrated eight days later.

One of the main settings for the festival is the Plaza de la Constitución, the town's main square, where Fregenal residents gather on the Sunday of Miracles. The eve of this day is marked by the traditional ringing of bells announcing the festival. On the night before, the Coral Frexnense presents the inaugural concert of the patronal festivals, traditionally performing prayers in honor of the Virgin of Los Remedios, which the group has sung to the Mother of Fregenal for over half a century.

The bells from the castle's Tower of Homage ring continuously throughout the Sunday, starting early in the morning to announce the solemn service of the Sunday of Miracles, during which Fregenal residents renew the Vow of 1506, a pledge of love and gratitude to the Patroness. The festival commemorates the miracle of the Virgin of Los Remedios, who, as recorded in the Book of Miracles, brought rain during a severe drought. Since then, Fregenal residents have elevated her to the status of their Principal Patroness, vowing to renew the Vow forever by praying vespers on the holy Sunday and processing to her holy sanctuary on her feast day, which commemorates the miracle.

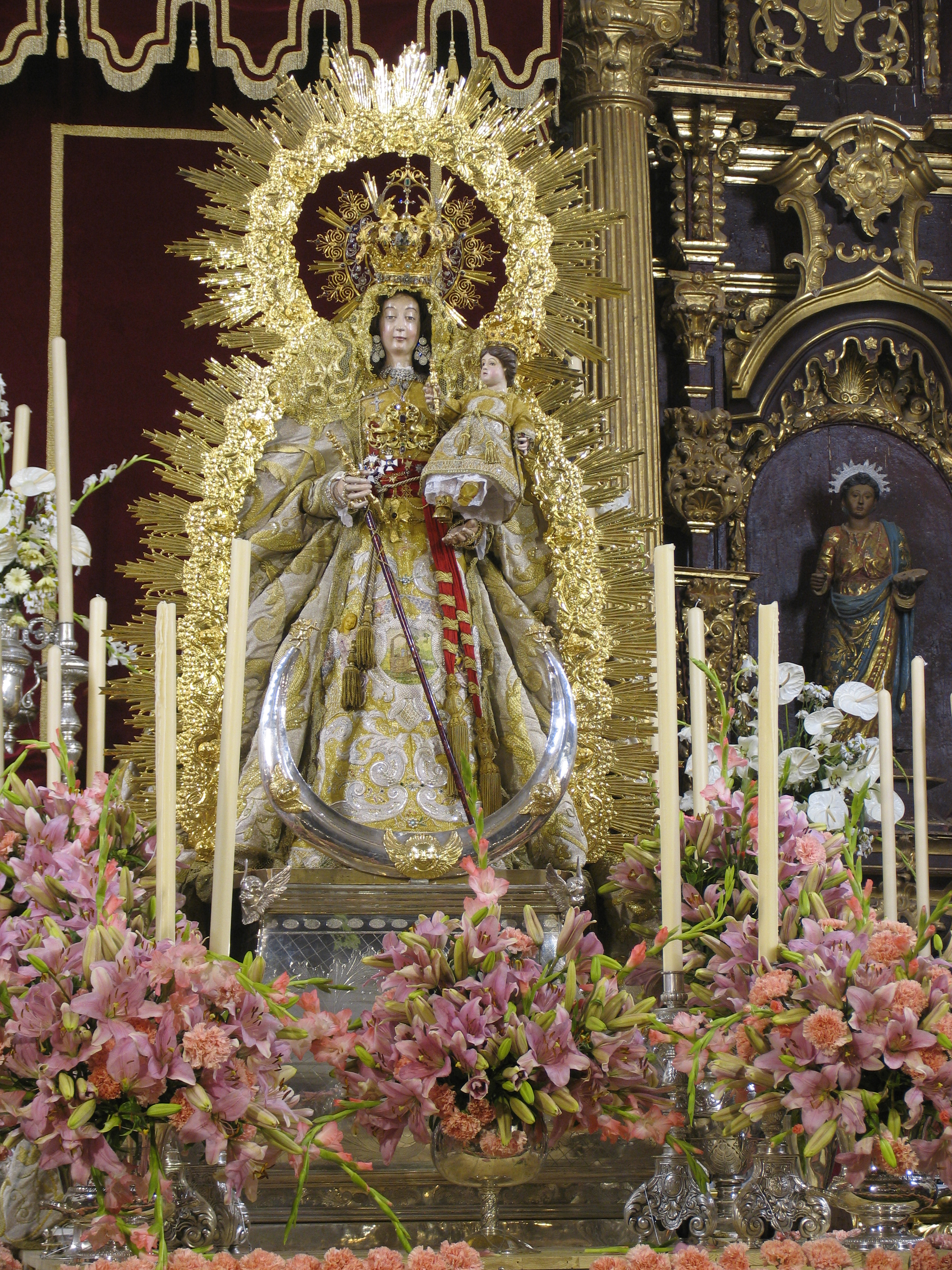
Virgin of Los Remedios, Patroness of Fregenal de la Sierra

At nightfall, the rosary procession takes to the streets of Fregenal, with the Rayo's rhythm proclaiming a devotion purified by water from the heavens. The lively rosary visits the town's main churches, accompanied by thousands of people from Fregenal and surrounding villages, following the lanterns of the three parishes that light the way. The sound of the Rayo pauses only before the candlelight, where prayers are offered to the Patroness, before resuming with the traditional Rosary Waltz, in which all attendees participate. The climax of this unusual procession takes place in front of the Santa María de la Plaza Church, the town's main church, where the people's prayers are raised to the heavens for the last time, concluding the festival with the hymn commemorating the 1906 Coronation of the Virgin of Los Remedios.

Both the Virgin's Feast and its Octave are centered at the Virgin's grounds, located six kilometers from the town. On the morning of the feast day, Fregenal residents walk the path separating the town from the Sanctuary, a procession in which, according to the Vow, at least one member of each household must participate. The festival unfolds amidst the Extremaduran dehesa, in a traditional pilgrimage setting that has been in place for over five centuries. The Jateros de la Virgen play a significant role, performing the Fandango before the Patroness and visiting the pilgrims’ groups, performing traditional local dances.

The festivals in honor of Fregenal's Patroness are celebrated the week following Holy Week, coinciding with Dominica in Albis. Every 25 years, the Virgin travels the six kilometers from her sanctuary to Fregenal to celebrate the anniversary of her Canonical Coronation, a major event for the town and region, attended by high-ranking religious, civil, and military authorities, as the Virgin of Los Remedios is the Captain General of the Armed Forces.

==== International Sierra Festival ====
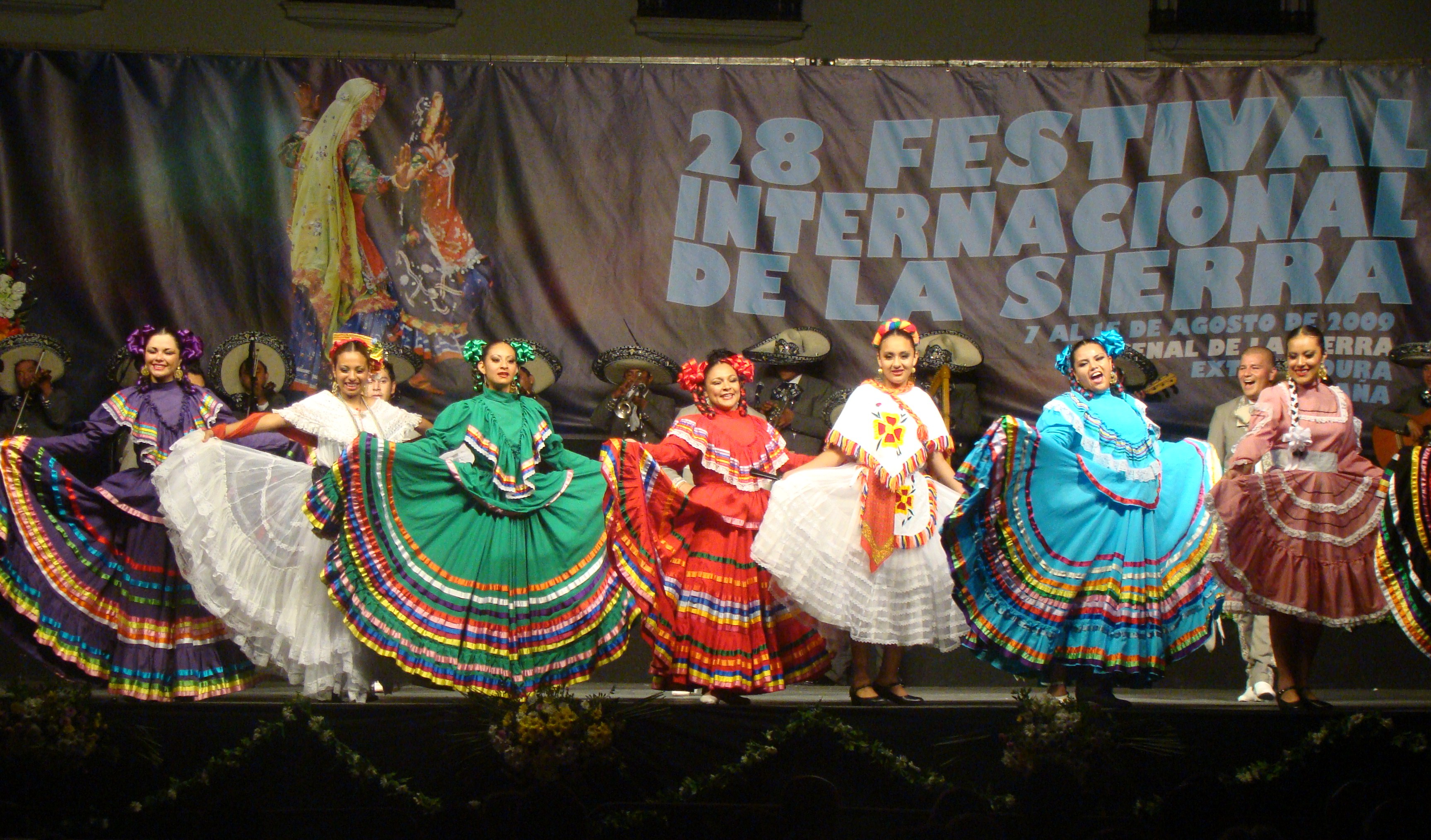
Performance by a Mexican group at the main stage of the FIS

The International Sierra Festival (FIS) was established in 1980 as the Extremadura Folk Dances and Songs Festival and is held in Fregenal from 7 to 14 August. It is one of the Festivals of Tourist Interest in Extremadura.

Its first venue was the Fregenal de la Sierra bullring. Today, the festival's stages are spread across various locations, including the Convent of San Francisco cloister, Piralito promenade, the market square, the interior of the Templar Castle, and the Plaza de la Constitución next to the Santa María de la Plaza parish church and the Templar Castle, in the heart of the town. Groups from all five continents, as well as Extremaduran groups, participate.

==== Virgen de la Salud Festival ====
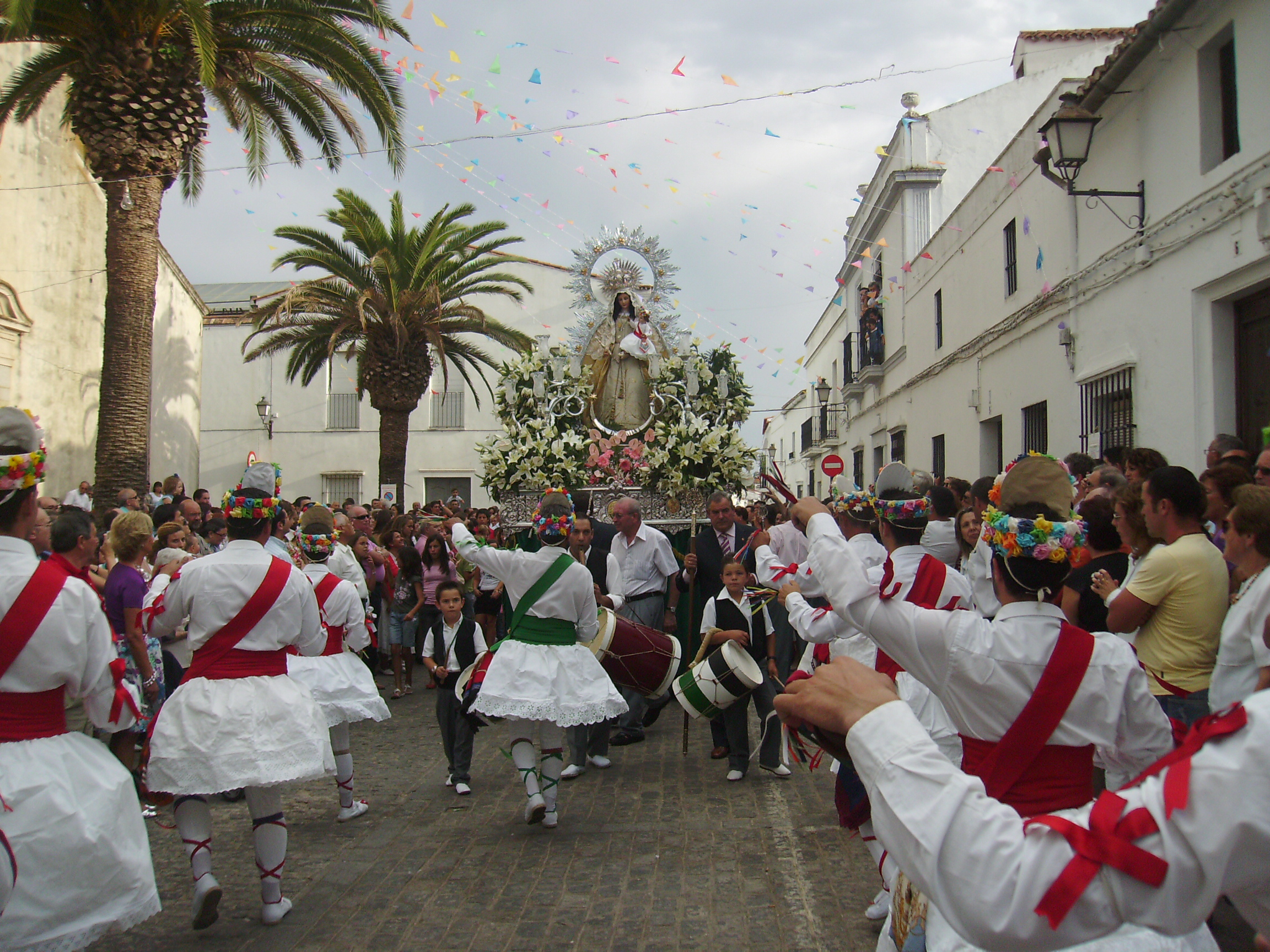
Procession of Our Lady of Health through the streets of Fregenal

From 30 August to 8 September, one of the oldest and most authentic festivals in Fregenal de la Sierra, the Virgen de la Salud Festival, is celebrated. A highlight is the group of dancers known as the Danzaores de la Virgen de la Salud, who, adorned in striking attire, perform an ancient and captivating ritual dance.

On 26 September 2017, the Dance and Festival of the Virgen de la Salud were declared a Bien de Interés Cultural by the Government of Extremadura, becoming part of the State's Cultural Heritage Register managed by the Ministry of Education, Culture and Sports, marking the first such designation in the region.

This declaration establishes the Virgen de la Salud Festival and Dance as a reference for the entire Extremadura autonomous community, as one of the main cultural expressions of southwestern Spain. The declaration highlights “the festival, its dance, the brotherhood, the preparations, the tambourine player, the Santa Catalina church, the image of the Virgin, the auction, the procession, the rosary, and the solidarity among the brothers, which constitute a rich heritage that legitimizes the request, not so much for the originality/singularity of this festive ritual but for its inseparable connection to Fregenal de la Sierra, its history, and its culture, whose continuity is explained by the sustained individual and collective efforts of social actors who, ultimately, have been protagonists and responsible for ensuring that the Festival and Dance of the Salud have reached our days as a fundamental part of Fregenal's heritage.”

==== San Mateo Fair and Festivals ====
The San Mateo Fair and Festivals, held in Fregenal de la Sierra, typically take place between 21 and 25 September, aligning with the weekend closest to the feast of Saint Matthew. Highlights include the opening proclamation delivered by prominent Fregenal residents, a rodeo at the fairgrounds, and activities at the municipal pavilion.

==== Gypsy Pilgrimage of the Virgin of Los Remedios ====
At the end of October, for over thirty years, Gypsies from Spain and countries such as Portugal, France, and Germany gather for what is likely the oldest Gypsy pilgrimage in Spain.

The Gypsy Pilgrimage of the Virgen of Los Remedios aims to serve as a meeting point between non-Gypsies and Gypsies. While it has a clear religious motivation, fostering coexistence and the values of the Gypsy community are also key objectives.

=== Gastronomy ===
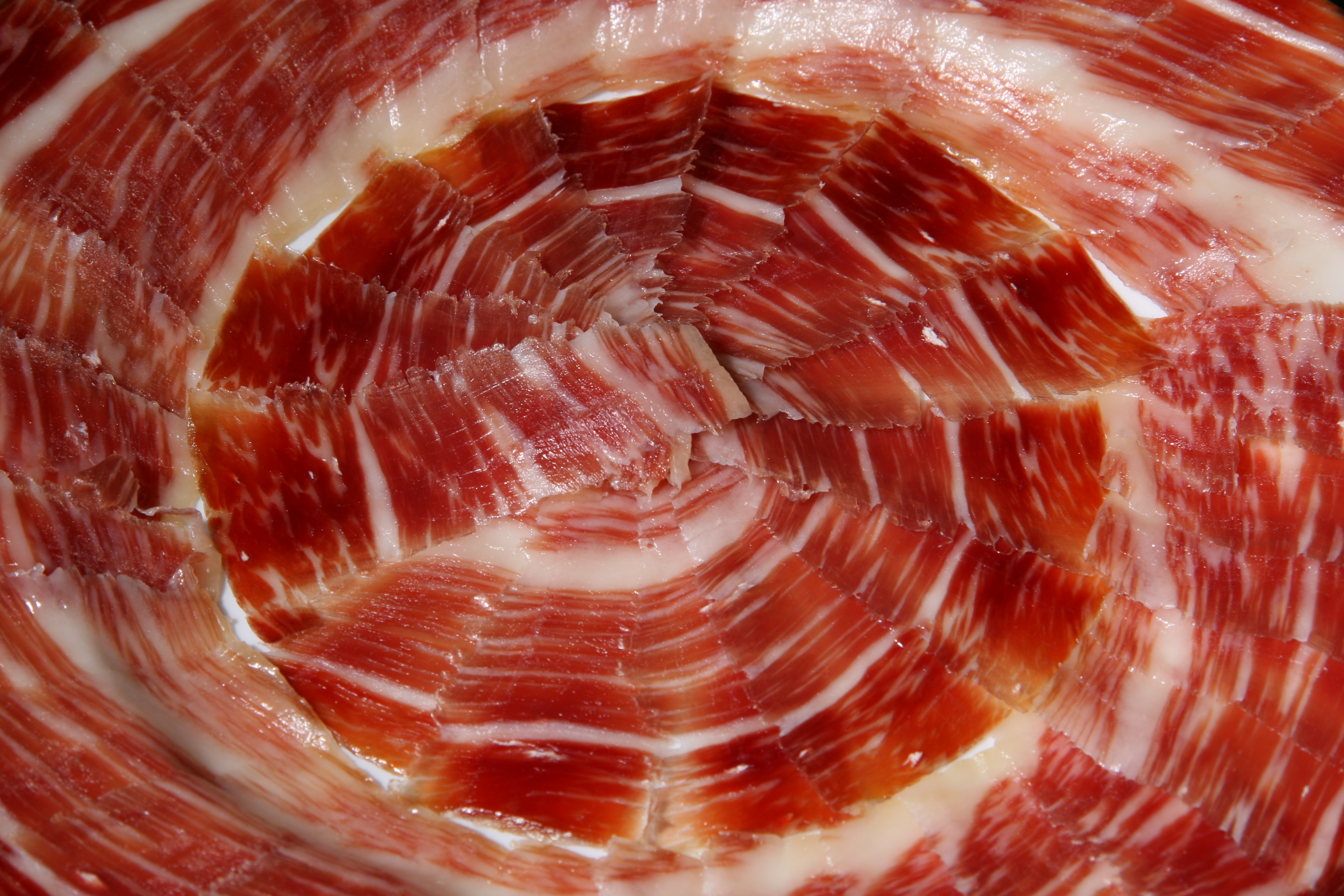
Serving of jamón ibérico

Fregenal's culinary tradition, rich in local products, delights first-time visitors. While much of the local cuisine revolves around Iberian pork and its derivatives, local pantries also feature a wide range of agricultural and livestock products.

Fregenal's cuisine has preserved its traditional dishes over time.

==== Iberian pork ====
For centuries, Iberian pigs have been a key part of the local diet, with their breeding and slaughter yielding various products. Charcuterie, particularly Iberian ham, is a prominent example.

The production of ham and other charcuterie items continues to follow traditional methods, even with the influence of modern industrialization. Its prestige has earned it the Dehesa de Extremadura designation of origin. To meet market demands, hams are categorized based on the pigs’ diet: “de bellota o montanera” for those raised traditionally in the dehesa, “recebo” for those supplemented with feed after time in the dehesa, and “pienso” for those raised in stables.

==== Typical dishes ====
The town is dotted with bars, restaurants, and shops offering a wide array of local food and drink. For breakfast or lunch, migas, a dry bread soup with salt, peppers, and garlic, remains a staple. Examples of appetizers include fried pork, fried cod, and local charcuterie and cheeses. Notable stews include caldereta and mandanga, the latter made with lamb tripe and hooves. Gazpacho is a refreshing option during warmer months.

In terms of desserts, pestiños, flores, magdalenas, and perrunillas are popular. The artisanal convent sweets made by the Augustinian Mothers of the Nuestra Señora de la Paz convent since the 16th century are highly popular, including almond hearts, nevaditos, Santa Rita pastes, perrunillas, and biscuits, recognized as Extremadura's best product in 2020. During Christmas, they also produce marzipan with candied fruits, almond mantecados, and marzipan logs. Piononos, meringues, and English pastries from renowned local confectioneries such as Risco, designated as the official confectioner of Alfonso XIII, are also noteworthy.

Aged red and white wines from local wineries accompany meals and appetizers, with “pitarra” wines being the most famous. Acorns from the dehesa not only feed Iberian pigs but are also used to produce acorn liqueur.

=== Media ===
Fregenal de la Sierra's media cover all significant events in the town. The first media outlet was the historic Eco de Fregenal, founded in 1880 by Manuel de Velasco y Jaraquemada, Marquis of Riocabado, and Luis Romero y Espinosa, a Fregenal folklorist. Its first edition, published on 1 March 1880, had a print run of 2,000 copies and five monthly issues. From 1880 to 1906, numerous publications emerged, including El Eco de Fregenal (1880), Boletín Literario del Eco de Fregenal (1882), El Folklore Bético-Extremeño (1883), El Folklore Frexnense (1883), El Serrano (1883), La Jeringa (1883), Extremadura Literaria (1884), El Amigo de la Verdad (1885), La Ilustración Extremeña (1886), El Frexnense (1887), La Ganga (1887), El Anunciador Extremeño (1890), El Eco de Fregenal (second era) (1894), La Voz de Fregenal (1894), El Nene (1896), El Látigo (1898), El Serrano (second era) (1901), La Semana (1904), El Frexnense (1905), El Heraldo Extremeño (1906), Gente Nueva (1906), and El Centenario (1906). During the rest of the 20th century, the number of publications declined, with only a few such as El Defensor (1911), El Homenaje (1923), Marmita Escolar (1971), and La Encina y el Olivo (1979).

Fregenal de la Sierra has always had a correspondent for the Extremadura Hoy Newspaper since its creation in 1933. In October 1995, Televisión Fregenal was launched as the town's first audiovisual media outlet. Its first program was a televised debate among representatives of the Fregenal Town Council. Subsequently, Televisión Fregenal broadcast a live program from the Santa María de la Plaza Church, coinciding with the concelebrated Mass of the Sunday of Miracles during the Virgen of Los Remedios festivals. This broadcast became an annual tradition, airing the town's most significant Mass to all Fregenal residents. During its years of operation, Televisión Fregenal was committed to the community, bringing political and social life closer to the public and producing various annual live programs related to Christmas and other Fregenal festivals.

Currently, Fregenal has media outlets such as ZF Televisión, a local channel for Zafra and Fregenal with programming focused on events such as Christmas, Holy Week, patronal festivals, and other activities. This channel is the successor to Televisión Fregenal since November 2012. In local print media, Hoy Fregenal, a digital newspaper with a monthly print edition, was created in 2010 as the first hyperlocal project by the Extremadura Hoy Newspaper for the region's towns and cities. Hoy Fregenal provides daily coverage of Fregenal's events, festivals, and political, social, cultural, and sports activities.

== See also ==
- List of municipalities in Badajoz
