= Battle of Bornos =

Battle of Bornos may refer to:

- Battle of Bornos (1811)
- Battle of Bornos (1812)
