= Francisco Ballesteros =

Spanish army officer

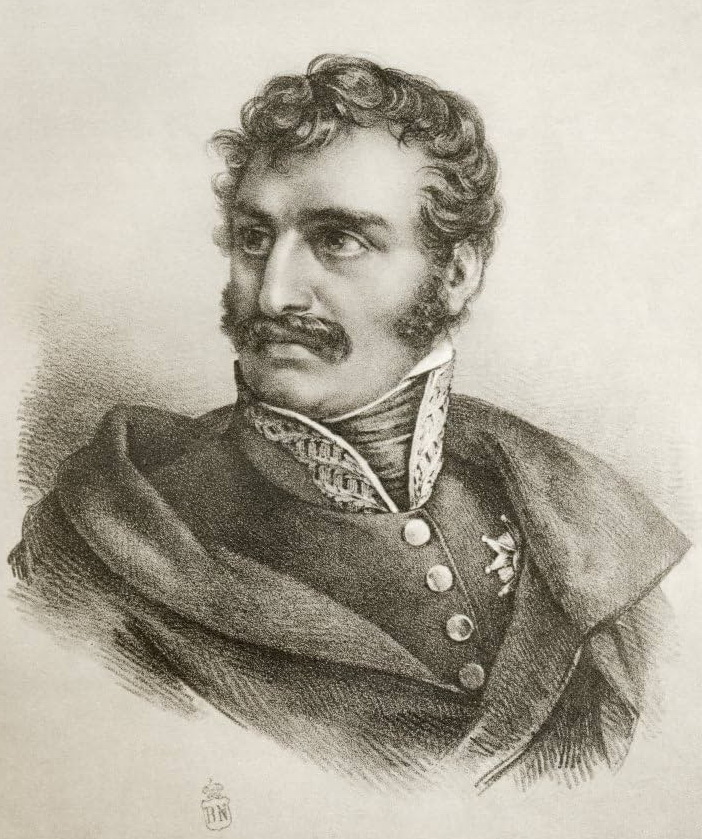
- Born: 7 March 1770; Zaragoza
- Died: 1833 (aged 62–63) Paris

Francisco López Ballesteros (Note: Oman (1908) spells it Ballasteros.) (7 March 1770 – 1833) was a Spanish army officer.

== Early career ==
Ballesteros enlisted as a cadet in 1788 in the 1st Battalion of Volunteers of Aragón where, apart from a ten-month stint with the Battalion of Volunteers of Navarra, he stayed until transferring to a Catalan regiment, where he was promoted to captain in 1794. He later saw action in the War of the Oranges as a captain in the Light Infantry Regiment of Barbastro.

== Peninsular War ==
Ballesteros was in Madrid during the 1808 Dos de Mayo Uprising, and immediately went up to Asturias, where the Junta General del Principado de Asturias promoted him to field marshal.

Following Blake's defeat at Espinosa, the Asturians had reorganized and increased the numbers of their battalions during the winter of 1808.

=== 1809 ===
By March 1809, the Junta had raised 20,000 men under arms, of which nearly 10,000 men were with Ballasteros at his headquarters at Colombres, where he had taken up the line of the Deba, skirmishing occasionally with the French outposts.

On 10 June 1809, he stormed Santander, driving out General Noirot. The following day General Bonet sent two battalions that were beaten off, but on the 12th, Bonet attacked with his whole force and defeated Ballesteros's division. Although Ballesteros himself escaped by sea, with José O'Donnell, 3,000 of his men were captured, and the rest dispersed, many of them fleeing back to Asturias. (Note: However, 300 regulars of La Romana's La Princesa Regiment, marched some 250 miles through Old Castile and Aragon, territory controlled by the French, to reach the borders of Valencia, where they joined Blake's army. (Oman, 1903: p. 387.))

In July 1809, he sailed from Gijón to La Coruña on HMS Amazon and then made his way down through Castile to Andalucía.

In the Autumn 1809 campaign, Ballesteros commanded the 3rd Division of Duke del Parque's Army of the Left. The 3rd was, by far, the largest division of that army, with 368 officers and 9,623 men (morning state of 20 November) and saw action at Tamames (18 October) and Alba de Tormes (28 November).

=== 1810 ===
On 19 February 1810, Ballasteros surprised the cavalry brigade of Mortier's 5th corps at Valverde, killing Brigadier Beauregard.

Ballesteros later carried out several operations against French forces in Andalusia when, in March–April 1810, the Marquis of La Romana sent Ballesteros's division, together with those of Mendizabal and Contreras, to harass Marshal Soult's 2nd Corps (still under the temporary command of General Heudelet).

On 25–26 March, his troops had an indecisive skirmish with one of Gazan's brigades, after which Ballesteros withdrew back into the hills of the Condado de Niebla. (Note: The old Condado de Niebla was a province of Huelva (Andalusia), located to the west of Seville.)

He then saw action at El Villar (14 April 1810) and on 15 April he was defeated at Zalamea by Mortier's division from Seville. Mortier's columns then pursued him through the mountains and defeated him again, this time at Aracena, on 26 May.

=== 1811 ===
Ballesteros's 5,000 men then played out a running fight with Mortier's troops in the area around Calera–Monesterio–Fregenal, without suffering much harm (4 January 1811).

At Castillejos (25 January 1811), Gazan's troops forced him to retreat across the Guadiana into Portugal.

On 2 March 1811, having re-entered Spain the previous month from Portugal, Ballasteros, at the head of 4,000 troops, defeated General Rémond by the Rio Tinto. A week later, on 9 March, Ballasteros surprised Remónd at La Palma, taking two guns, and driving the French force back into Seville.

He was promoted to lieutenant general in 1811.

On 12 April 1811, Ballesteros's division, numbering some 3,500 troops, were beaten by Maransin's seven battalions of infantry at Fregenal, on the borders of Estremadura.

With Blake and Zayas, he commanded the Spanish divisions at the Battle of Albuera (16 May 1811).

On 4 September 1811, he landed at Algeciras and was being hunted by several battalions of Soult's reserve; some 10,000 troops under Barrois, Semellé, and Godinot were being used against Ballesteros in October. The situation was such that, in the words of Oman,

During the midwinter of 1811-12 Soult's main attention was taken up by a serious enterprise in the extreme south of his viceroyalty, which [...] rendered it impossible for him to take the offensive in any other direction. This was the attempt to crush Ballasteros, and to capture Tarifa... (Oman, 1914: p. 111.)

On 5 November, when the three French columns hunting him were forced, due to lack of provisions, to withdraw and to disperse, he attacked their rearguard, defeating Semellé at the first battle of Bornos.

On 17–18 December, near the pass of Ojen, Ballasteros, at the head of 2,000 men, attacked the rearguard battalion of the siege train that had left Cádiz, headed for Tarifa. When a full brigade under Barrois turned back to counterattack, the Spanish troops retreated to San Roque.

=== 1812 ===
On 11 April 1812, he failed to take the Castle of Zahara. Two days later, one of his columns succeeded in entering Osuna but withdrew after failing to take its citadel and following reports that Soult was approaching. On the 14th, at Alhaurin, he intercepted brigadier Rey's three battalions that had left Malaga to relieve the garrison at Ronda, captured their two guns and routed them, forcing them back to Malaga.

Ballasteros was appointed commander-in-chief of the 4th Army in August 1812.

On 24 October 1812, unwilling to accept a foreigner (Wellington) as supreme commander of the Spanish Army, (Note: Oman (1903) commented: In the autumn of 1812 [Wellington's] retreat beyond the Douro need never have been made, if Ballasteros had obeyed orders, and moved up from Granada to threaten Soult's flank, instead of remaining torpid in his cantonments 200 miles from the theatre of war. (Oman 1903, p. 299.)) Ballesteros mutinied and was dismissed on 12 December and later imprisoned in Ceuta, on the North African coast.

== Post-war career ==
In 1815, Fernando VII appointed him minister for War but later dismissed him and banished him to Valladolid.

=== Liberal Revolution ===
When the liberal revolution broke out in 1820, he was called back to Madrid, where on 7 March he was appointed commander-in-chief of the Army of the centre. He became vice-president of the junta provisional two days later, closing many prisons of the Holy Inquisition and restoring municipal rights.

On 7 July 1822, Ballesteros defeated the Royal Guards, preventing a coup against the Constitution. For this he was named Captain General of Madrid. In 1823, he fought the French invasion under Louis-Antoine, Duke of Angoulême in Navarra and Aragón, but he had to capitulate on 21 August 1823 in Caporla.

On 1 October 1823 Fernando VII started his campaign of repression against all who had supported the constitutional government. Ballesteros fled to Cádiz, where he embarked on a British ship for France. He spent the rest of his life in Paris, where he died in 1833.
