= Annet Morio de L'Isle =

- Born: 3 January 1779; Chantelle, Allier, France
- Died: 22 February 1828 (aged 49); Vanves, Paris, France
- Military career
- Allegiance: France
- Branch: Infantry
- Service years: (France) 1799–1815 (Netherlands) 1806–1810
- Rank: General of Brigade
- Conflicts: War of the Second Coalition; Peninsular War; Siege of Gerona; Siege of Cádiz; Battle of Albuera; Battle of Bornos; Siege of Tarifa; War of the Sixth Coalition; Battle of Leipzig; Siege of Mainz
- Awards: Légion d'Honneur
- Other work: Baron of the Empire, 1813

Annet Morio de L'Isle (French: [anɛ mɔʁjo də lil]; 3 January 1779 – 22 February 1828) became a French and Dutch brigade commander during the Napoleonic Wars. In 1799 he joined a cavalry regiment and was posted to the Army of Italy in 1800 where he was wounded. He became an aide-de-camp to Louis Bonaparte in 1804 and went with Louis when he became King of Holland in 1806. He became a general of brigade in the Dutch army in 1809 and led a German brigade at the Third Siege of Gerona. After the Kingdom of Holland was annexed by the First French Empire in 1810, Morio was demoted to colonel in the French army. Starting in December 1810, he led the 16th Light Infantry Regiment at Cádiz, Albuera, Bornos and Tarifa. He was promoted general of brigade and appointed Baron of the Empire in 1813. He fought at Leipzig in 1813 and at Mainz in 1814. His surname is one of the names inscribed under the Arc de Triomphe, on Column 21.

== See also ==
- List of French generals of the Revolutionary and Napoleonic Wars
