= Segura de León =

- Municipality
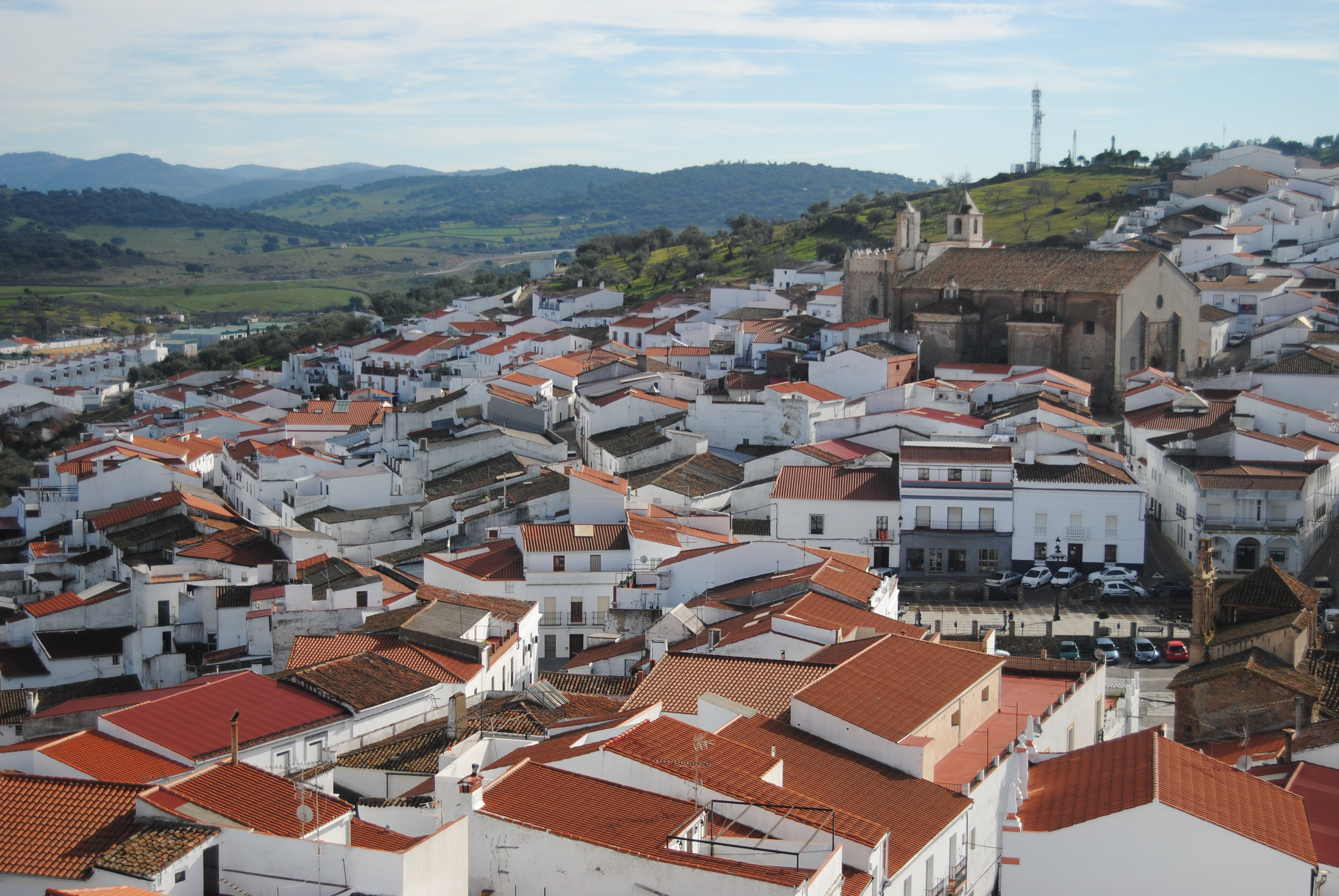

- Flag Coat of arms

- Location within Spain Location within Extremadura
- Coordinates: 38°7′15″N 6°31′45″W
- Country: Spain
- Autonomous community: Extremadura
- Province: Badajoz

Government
  - Alcalde: Lorenzo Molina Medina

Area
  - Total: 106 km^{2} (41 sq mi)
- Elevation: 700 m (2,300 ft)

Population (2025-01-01)
  - Total: 1,758
- Time zone: UTC+1 (CET)
  - Summer (DST): UTC+2 (CEST)
- Website: Ayuntamiento de Segura de León

Segura de León is a Spanish municipality in the province of Badajoz, Extremadura. It has a population of 2,170 (2007) and an area of 106 km^{2}. It belongs to the comarca of Tentudía.

== History ==
Ferdinand III tasked the Knights of the Order of Santiago with reinforcing the land forces of the amphibious siege on Seville, so the territory around Montemolín including Segura was conquered by the knights towards 1246–1248 as part of the operations to clean up the rearguard in Sierra Morena. Paio Peres Correia, Master of the Order of Santiago, granted Segura a fuero (copied from that of Sepúlveda) on 26 March 1274, thus Segura segregated from the encomienda of Montemolín and became a standalone town.

== See also ==
- List of municipalities in Badajoz
