= Tynecastle =

Tynecastle may refer to:

- Tynecastle F.C., East of Scotland Football League team
- Tynecastle High School, in Edinburgh, Scotland
- Tynecastle Park, football stadium in Edinburgh, Scotland
