= Tentudía =

- Comarca
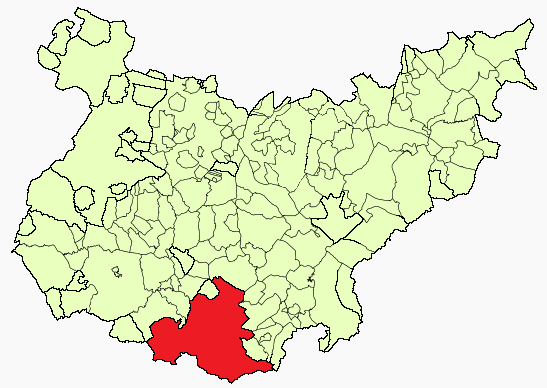
- Location in Badajoz
- Coordinates: 38°7′38″N 6°23′32″W
- Country: Spain
- Autonomous community: Extremadura
- Province: Badajoz

Area
  - Total: 1,287 km^{2} (497 sq mi)

Population (2008)
  - Total: 21,792
  - Density: 16.93/km^{2} (43.85/sq mi)
- Time zone: UTC+1 (CET)
  - Summer (DST): CEST

Tentudía is a comarca in Badajoz, Extremadura, Spain. It contains the following municipalities: Bienvenida, Bodonal de la Sierra, Cabeza la Vaca, Calera de León, Fuente de Cantos, Fuentes de León, Monesterio, Montemolín, and Segura de León.
