= Battle of Bornos (1812) =

1812 battle during the Peninsular War

- Part of Peninsular War
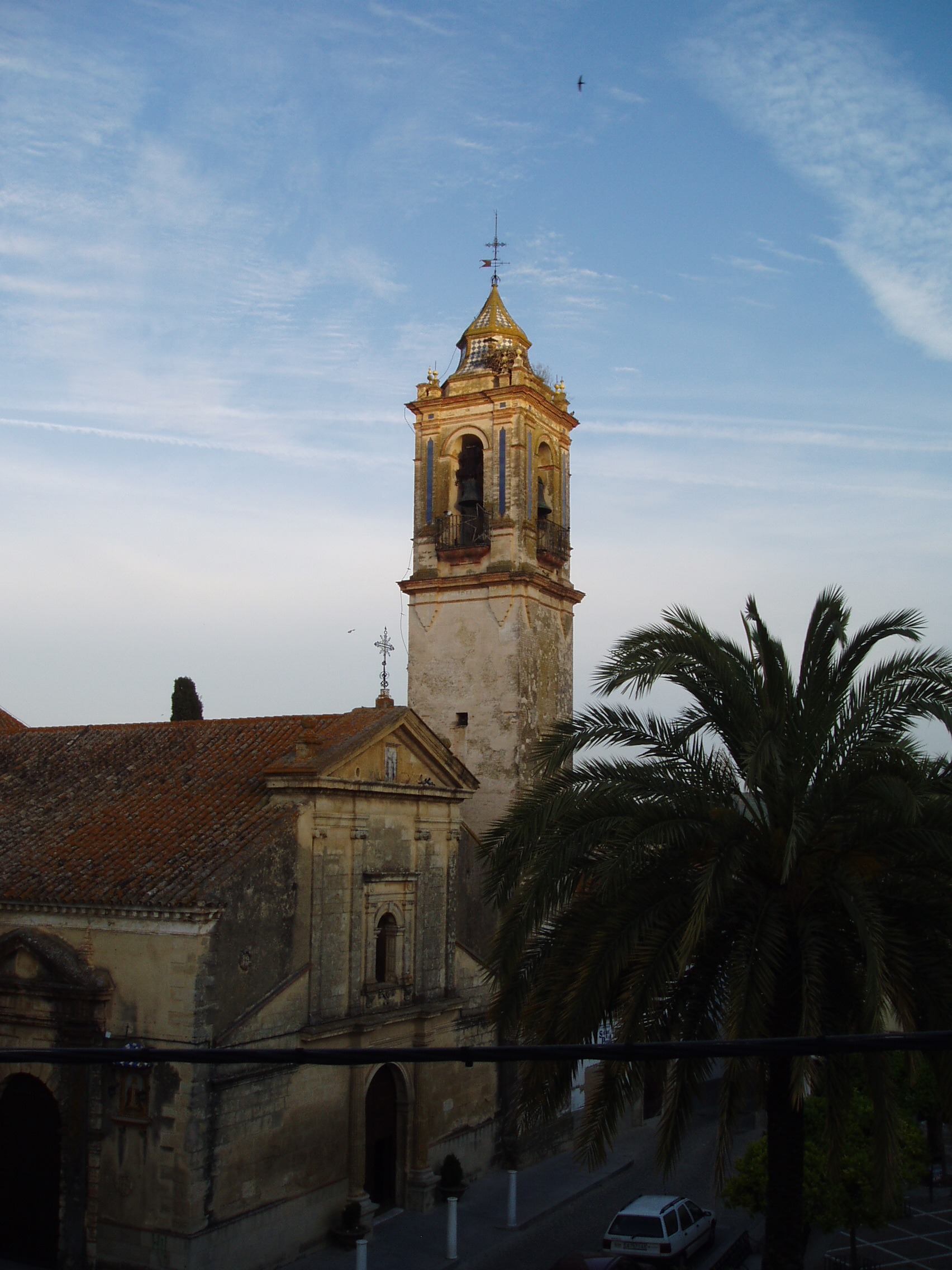
- Santo Domingo Church in Bornos
Date	31 May 1812
Location	Bornos, Spain 36°49′N 5°44′W
Result	French victory

Belligerents
(First French Empire) French Empire	Kingdom of Spain

Commanders and leaders
(First French Empire) Nicolas Conroux	(Spain) Francisco Ballesteros

Strength
4,500	8,500

Casualties and losses
500	1,500; 600 captured 4 guns captured 2 colours captured

Peninsular War: Siege of Cádiz
current battle

The Battle of Bornos on 31 May 1812, saw a Spanish force led by Francisco Ballesteros attack an Imperial French division under Nicolas François Conroux. Though the Spanish achieved surprise, the outnumbered French soldiers fought back and drove off their assailants. The Spanish suffered losses considerably higher than the French. Bornos is located on Route 342 about 40 miles (64 km) northeast of Jerez de la Frontera. The battle occurred during the Peninsular War, part of the Napoleonic Wars.

== Battle ==
In March 1812, General of Division Nicolas François Conroux held the town with a division of 5,445 men in eight battalions plus attached artillery. Francisco Ballesteros left Gibraltar in early May and marched toward Bornos. Covered by a fog, the Spanish troops attacked the town and gained an initial advantage. However, Conroux was able to rally his troops and began launching a series of counterattacks. The French troops included the 9th Light and 96th Line Infantry Regiments, the 5th Chasseurs à Cheval Regiment, and a squadron of the 2nd Chasseurs à Cheval. At length, Conroux was able to defeat Ballesteros, capturing 600 Spanish soldiers, four cannons, and two colors. Historian Digby Smith listed the French units as two battalions each of the 9th Light and 96th Line, one battalion of the 16th Light, and the 5th Chasseurs à Cheval for a total of 4,500 men. He noted that Ballesteros lost 1,500 casualties and four cannons out of a total force of 8,500 troops. This author named the battle "Cadiz" and gave a date of 1 June. David Gates wrote that the French lost about 500 casualties and agreed with Smith that Conroux's men inflicted total losses of about 1,500 on their enemies.

Before, an earlier Battle of Bornos occurred on 5 November 1811. Three French columns were unsuccessful in an attempt to trap a Spanish force led by Ballesteros. So instead, the Spanish general lashed out at one of the pursuing columns, inflicting 100 casualties and inducing an entire French-allied Spanish Juramentado battalion to change sides. Smith called this a French victory.
