= Hugh Eliot =

British flying ace of WWII

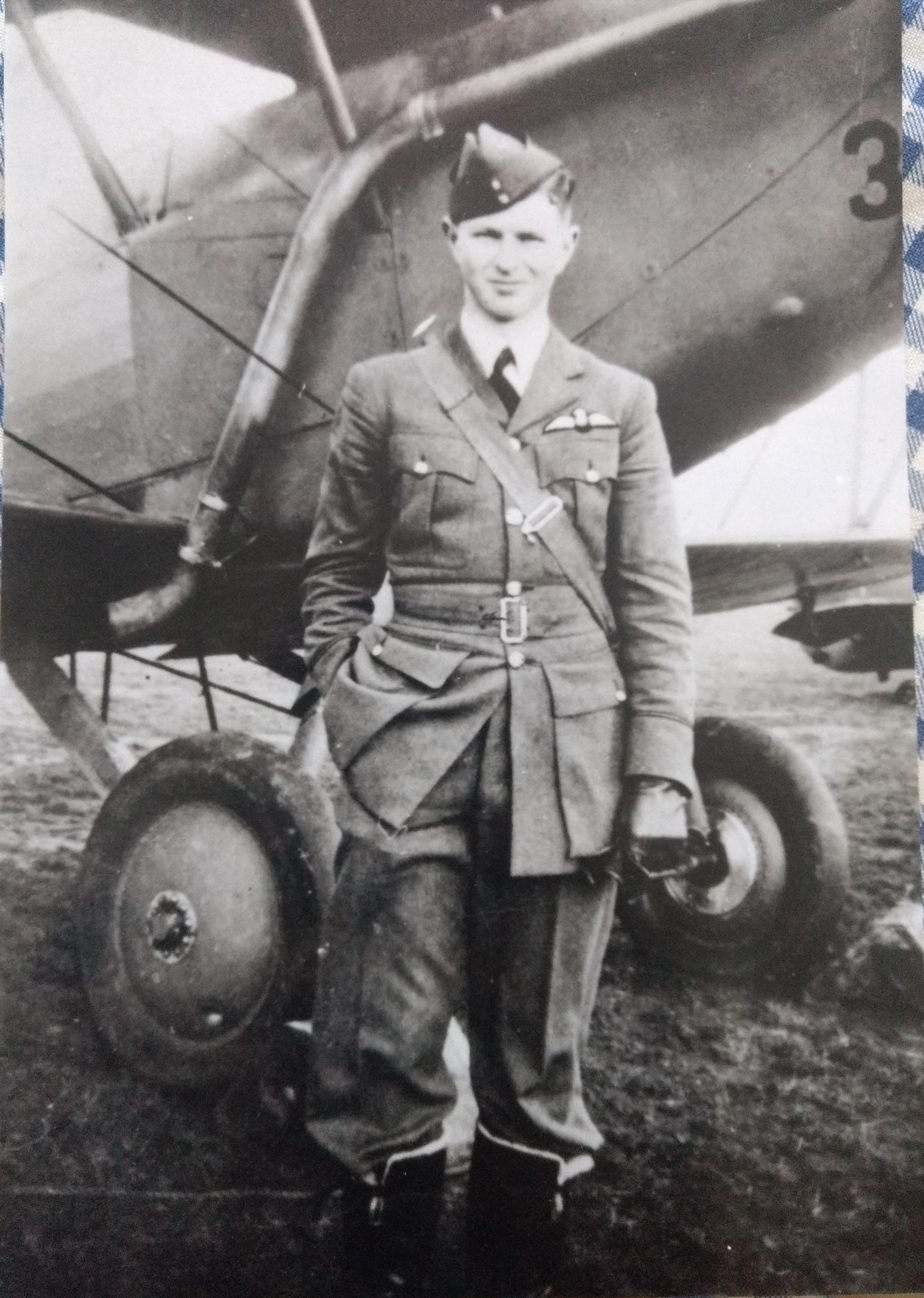
- Born: 16 April 1921; Lewisham, London, United Kingdom
- Died: 4 March 1945 (aged 23); Northern Italy
- Burial place: Argenta Gap War Cemetery, Italy
- Military career
- Allegiance: United Kingdom
- Branch: Royal Air Force
- Service years: 1939–1945 †
- Rank: Wing Commander
- Units: No. 73 Squadron; No. 261 Squadron; No. 185 Squadron
- Commands: No. 255 Squadron; No. 256 Squadron
- Conflicts: Second World War: Battle of France; Battle of Britain; Siege of Malta; North African campaign; Italian campaign
- Awards: Distinguished Service Order; Distinguished Flying Cross; Mention in Despatches

Hugh Eliot, DSO, DFC (16 April 1921 – 4 March 1945) was a flying ace of the Royal Air Force (RAF) during the Second World War. He is credited with the destruction of at least nine aircraft.

From Lewisham, Eliot joined the RAF in mid-1939 and completed his training the following year. Posted to No. 73 Squadron, he flew in the Battle of France and then the following aerial campaign over southeast England. Flying the Hawker Hurricane fighter, he claimed a number of aerial victories during this period before, in October 1940, he was sent to Malta. There he flew with Nos. 261 and 185 Squadrons before returning to the United Kingdom in September 1941. Awarded the Distinguished Flying Cross, he was off operations until late 1942, when he was posted to No. 255 Squadron. He served with the unit in North Africa as it performed night fighting duties. In September 1944, after being awarded the Distinguished Service Order, he was appointed commander of No. 256 Squadron in Italy. He was killed on 4 March 1945 when his de Havilland Mosquito heavy fighter was shot down by anti-aircraft fire while attacking a bridge in northern Italy.

== Early life ==
Hugh William Eliot was born on 16 April 1921 in the London suburb of Lewisham, in the United Kingdom. He was educated at St Dunstan's College and later moved to Dulwich College. Once his education was completed he worked for Lloyds Bank.

In June 1939, Eliot joined the Royal Air Force (RAF) on a short service commission and commenced training at No. 6 Elementary and Reserve Flying Training School. Successfully completing this phase of training, he was commissioned as an acting pilot officer on probation on 19 August.

== Second World War ==
After further training, including a conversion course at No. 6 Operational Training Unit on Hawker Hurricane fighters, Eliot was posted to No. 73 Squadron in late April 1940. By this time he had ended his probationary period.

=== Battles of France and Britain ===
When Eliot joined it, No. 73 Squadron was based at Rouvres in France from where it was engaged in patrolling duties as part of the RAF's Advanced Air Striking Force. On 11 May, the day after the German invasion of France and the Low Countries, Eliot damaged a Messerschmitt Bf 110 heavy fighter. Five days later he shot down a pair of German aircraft, although their type was uncertain. He destroyed a Bf 110 on 3 June. No. 73 Squadron was heavily engaged throughout its service in France and relocated several times as the Germans advanced. It was withdrawn to England on 17 June. Eliot was confirmed in his pilot officer rank a few days later.

No. 73 Squadron reformed at Church Fenton and underwent training in night fighter operations. In early July it became operational by day, and a month later was approved for night operations. On 6 September, his Hurricane was damaged in an engagement with a Messerschmitt Bf 109 fighter. With the aircraft on fire, he bailed out. While he safely landed, due to being burnt he was hospitalised for three weeks, returning to the squadron at the end of the month.

=== Siege of Malta ===
On 19 October, Eliot was one of several pilots sent to the depot at Uxbridge to prepare for an assignment to Malta, which was under siege by the Regia Aeronautica (Royal Italian Air Force). Boarding the aircraft carrier HMS Argus four days later for the voyage to the Mediterranean, he flew a Hurricane off its flight deck on 17 November for the final part of the journey to Malta. Once there he was posted to No. 261 Squadron. This was based at Takali and tasked with carrying out standing patrols to counter the fighter-bomber raids being mounted by the Italians. Eliot was mentioned in despatches on 1 January 1941. With the Luftwaffe now involved in operations against Malta, he shot down a Junkers Ju 87 dive bomber over the island on 26 February, and also probably destroyed a second. Two days later, he was promoted to flying officer.

In July Eliot was posted to the newly formed No. 185 Squadron to serve as one of its flight commanders. This was at the airfield at Hal Far and operating Hurricanes. Two months later he was repatriated to England, where he was awarded the Distinguished Flying Cross on 26 September. He was then briefly posted to No. 242 Squadron at Valley but was rested in October after just a few weeks with his new unit.

=== North Africa and Italy ===
Promoted to flight lieutenant in February 1942, Eliot underwent training in night fighting duties and then, towards the end of the year was posted to No. 255 Squadron. This was based at Honiley but preparing for a move to North Africa with its Bristol Beaufighter heavy fighters. From November it was based in Algeria on night defence duties but switched to carrying out intruder missions from March 1943.

In August Eliot was made an acting squadron leader and appointed the commander of the squadron. By this time, it was based at Borizzo Airfield in Sicily and carrying operations in support of the landings at Salerno. On the night of 9 September, he destroyed a Messerschmitt Me 210 heavy fighter in the vicinity of Salerno. Two months later his substantive rank was made up to squadron leader. A Dornier Do 217 medium bomber was shot down by Eliot on the night of 30 January 1944. He relinquished command of the squadron in February to commence another rest period.

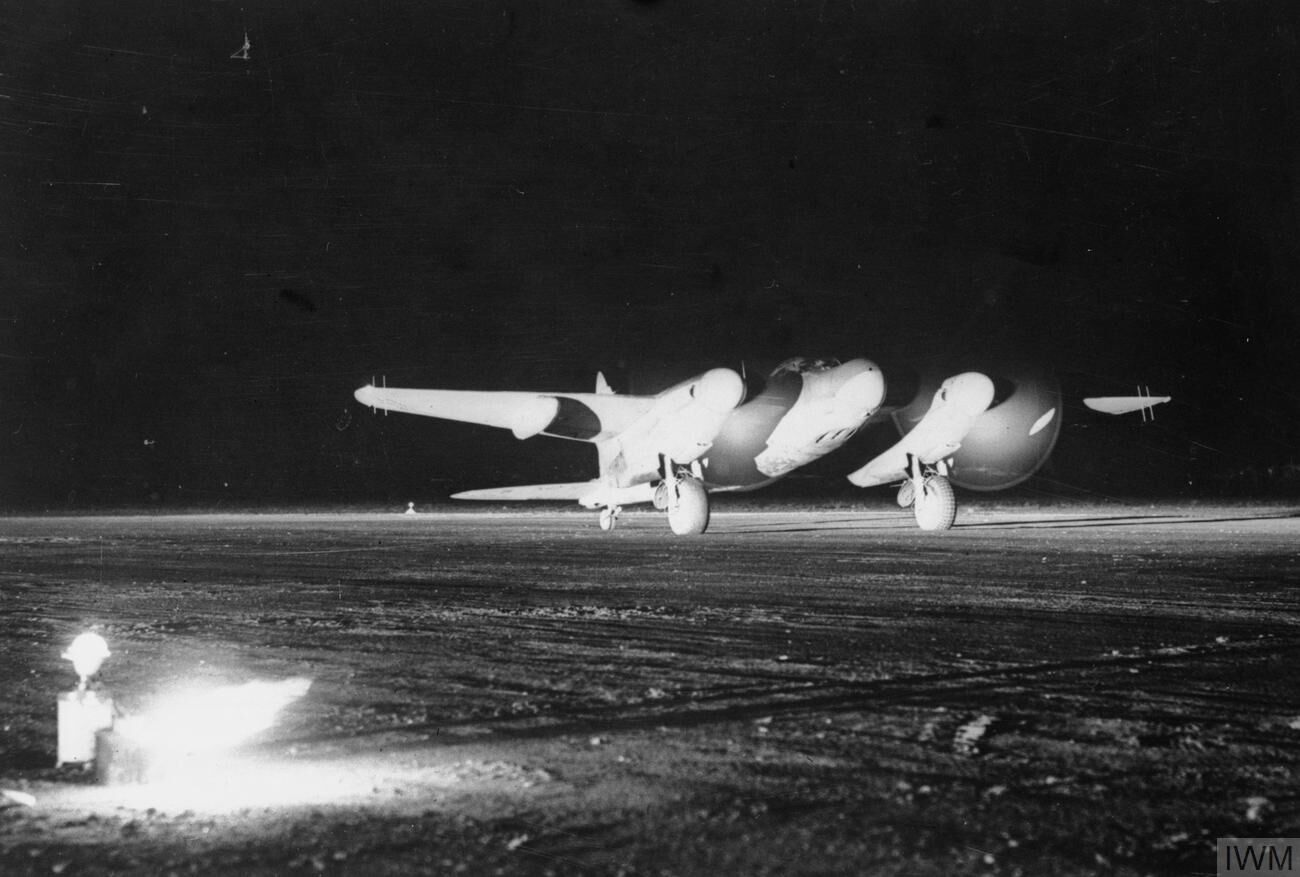
A No. 256 Squadron de Havilland Mosquito heavy fighter preparing to take off from its airfield at Foggia, in Italy

Awarded the Distinguished Service Order on 23 May, Eliot returned to operational duties in late September with a posting to Foggia, in Italy as commander of No. 256 Squadron. This was equipped with the de Havilland Mosquito heavy fighter and was tasked with carrying out intruder sorties to northern Italy and the Balkans. He intercepted and destroyed a Junkers Ju 52 transport near Salonika on the night of 4 October. This was followed two nights later by his destruction of a Dornier Do 24 floatplane that crashed at Phalerum.

On a night sortie on 4 March 1945, Eliot was attacking a bridge in northern Italy when his Mosquito was struck by anti-aircraft fire. He and his navigator, Flight Lieutenant W. Cox, were killed. At the time of his death, he held the rank of acting wing commander. Buried at the Argenta Gap War Cemetery in Italy, Eliot is credited with having shot down nine aircraft, one of which was shared with other pilots. He is also credited with two aircraft probably destroyed, with one of these shared. One aircraft is credited as being damaged by Eliot.
