= Tom Hunter (VC) =

British recipient of the Victoria Cross (1923–1945)

Corporal Tom Hunter VC
- Detailed view of the inscription on the Edinburgh memorial
- Born: 6 October 1923; Aldershot, Hampshire, England
- Died: 3 April 1945 (aged 21); Lake Comacchio, Italy
- Burial place: Argenta Gap War Cemetery, Emilia-Romagna
- Relatives: John Swinney (nephew)
- Military career
- Allegiance: United Kingdom
- Branch: Royal Marines
- Service years: 1942–1945 †
- Rank: Corporal
- Unit: 43 Commando
- Conflicts: Second World War: Italian Campaign; Operation Roast †
- Awards: Victoria Cross

The memorial to Thomas Peck Hunter outside Ocean Terminal in Edinburgh.

Thomas Peck Hunter VC (6 October 1923 – 3 April 1945) was a British recipient of the Victoria Cross, the highest and most prestigious award for gallantry in the face of the enemy that can be awarded to British and Commonwealth forces.

== Background ==
Thomas Hunter was born at Louise Margaret Hospital in Aldershot on 6 October 1923, one of five children of Ramsay and Mary Hunter (a former soldier and civil servant), who moved to Edinburgh shortly after his birth. Hunter attended Stenhouse Primary School and Tynecastle High School (where the poet Wilfred Owen had taught during recuperation in 1917) before becoming an apprentice stationer in Edinburgh. Hunter's nephew is Scottish First Minister John Swinney.

== Military career ==
At the outbreak of the war he served in the Home Guard and was called up on 8 May 1942 for military service. He enlisted as a hostilities–only (HO) marine on 23 June 1942. He was promoted LCpl on 6 October 1943 and Temporary Cpl on 25 January 1945.

=== Victoria Cross ===
Hunter was 21 years old, and a temporary corporal in 43 (RM) Commando during the Spring 1945 offensive in Italy during the Second World War when the following incident took place. He was awarded the VC for his actions during Operation Roast.

On 2 April 1945 at Lake Comacchio, Italy, Corporal Hunter, who was in charge of a Bren gun section, offered himself as a target to save his troop. Seizing the Bren gun, he charged alone across 200 yards of open ground under most intense fire towards a group of houses where three MG 42 machine-guns were lodged. So determined was his charge that the enemy soldiers were demoralized and six gunners surrendered. The remainder fled. Hunter cleared the house, changing magazines as he ran and continued to draw enemy fire until most of the troop had reached cover, Hunter was killed, firing accurately to the last. Danish national, Major Anders Lassen of the Special Boat Service (SBS) was also awarded a VC posthumously in the same action.

== Citation ==
Cpl Thomas Hunter's VC citation in the London Gazette of 12 June 1945 reads:

ADMIRALTY.
Whitehall 12 June 1945.

The KING has been graciously pleased to approve the award of the VICTORIA CROSS for valour to: —

The late Corporal (Temporary) Thomas Peck HUNTER, CH/X. 110296, Royal Marines (attached Special Service Troops) (43rd Royal Marine Commando) (Edinburgh).

In Italy during the advance by the Commando to its final objective, Corporal Hunter of "C" Troop was in charge of a Bren group of the leading sub-section of the Commando. Having advanced to within 400 yards of the canal, he observed the enemy were holding a group of houses South of the canal. Realising that his Troop behind him were in the open, as the country there was completely devoid of cover, and that the enemy would cause heavy casualties as soon as they opened fire, Corporal Hunter seized the Bren gun and charged alone across two hundred yards of open ground. Three Spandaus from the houses, and at least six from the North bank of the canal opened fire and at the same time the enemy mortars started to fire at the Troop.

Corporal Hunter attracted most of the fire, and so determined was his charge and his firing from the hip that the enemy in the houses became demoralised. Showing complete disregard for the intense enemy fire, he ran through the houses, changing magazines as he ran, and alone cleared the houses. Six Germans surrendered to him and the remainder fled across a footbridge onto the North bank of the canal.

The Troop dashing up behind Corporal Hunter now became the target for all the Spandaus on the North of the canal. Again, offering himself as a target, he lay in full view of the enemy on a heap of rubble and fired at the concrete pillboxes on the other side. He again drew most of the fire, but by now the greater part of the Troop had made for the safety of the houses. During this period he shouted encouragement to the remainder, and called only for more Bren magazines with which he could engage the Spandaus. Firing with great accuracy up to the last, Corporal Hunter was finally hit in the head by a burst of Spandau fire and killed instantly.

There can be no doubt that Corporal Hunter offered himself as a target in order to save his Troop, and only the speed of his movement prevented him being hit earlier. The skill and accuracy with which he used his Bren gun is proved by the way he demoralised the enemy, and later did definitely silence many of the Spandaus firing on his Troop as they crossed open ground, so much so that under his covering fire elements of the Troop made their final objective before he was killed.

Throughout the operation his magnificent courage, leadership and cheerfulness had been an inspiration to his comrades.

King George VI presented his VC to his parents at a private investiture on 26 September 1945 at Holyrood House. In September 1974 the medal was donated by his sister and nephew to the Royal Marines Museum in Southsea, where all 10 Royal Marines VCs are securely stored, the medal on display there being a copy.

== Legacy ==
Hunter is buried at the Argenta Gap (CWGC) War Cemetery, Emilia-Romagna in plot III.G.20. The Royal Marines treasure the memory of their only Second World War Victoria Cross recipient and a number of buildings, memorials and organisations are named after him. Scotland also honours one of her heroes. Known memorials and tributes are:

- Memorials and Tributes
  - Ocean Terminal, Edinburgh, Scotland – Memorial to Thomas Hunter (pictured)
  - Royal Marines Museum, Eastney – Personal display in medal room and also named on 43 Commando memorial in the museum's Memorial Garden.
  - Memorial at Porto Garibaldi, Italy – unveiled April 1992.
  - Memorial Ship's Bell, CTCRM, Lympstone.
  - Stenhouse Primary School, Edinburgh – Plaque
  - Tynecastle High School, Edinburgh – Memorial.
  - Gibraltar Building, HMNB Clyde – Display and tribute adjacent to 43 Commando's Colours cabinet.
  - House Plaque, Stenhouse – a plaque placed on one of a small development of eight houses in Stenhouse in March 1954.
- Buildings and Organisations
  - Hunter Company (formerly Hunter Troop) at the Commando Training Centre Royal Marines.
  - Hunter Block – Fleet Protection Group Royal Marines accommodation block at HMNB Clyde.

== Sources ==
- British VCs of World War 2 (John Laffin, 1997)
- Monuments to Courage (David Harvey, 1999)
- The Register of the Victoria Cross (This England, 1997)
