= Digby Smith =

British military historian (1935–2024)

- Born: Digby George Smith; 1 January 1935; Aldershot, England
- Died: 9 January 2024 (aged 89); Thetford, England
- Other name: Otto von Pivka
- Education: Farnborough Grammar School; German Armed Forces Command and Staff College
- Occupation: Military historian
- Spouse(s): Rita Prime (1961–1984; divorced); Edna Bluck (?–2024; his death)
- Children: 3
- Parent(s): George Frederick Smith and Catherine Mary Smith

Digby George Smith (1 January 1935 – 9 January 2024), who also used the pseudonym Otto von Pivka, was a British military historian. The son of a British career soldier, he was born in Hampshire, England, but spent several years in India and Pakistan as a child and youth. As a "boy soldier", he entered training in the British Army at the age of 16. He was later commissioned in the Royal Corps of Signals, and held several postings with the British Army of the Rhine.

After a career in the British Army Signal Corps, he retired and with a friend started a company selling body armour, followed by several years working in the telecommunications industry. After his second retirement, he lived for a while in Hanau, Germany, but then moved back to Britain.

Originally writing under the pen name, Otto von Pivka, since his retirement from the military he has written another dozen books, venturing into narrative history with his 1813: Leipzig : Napoleon and the Battle of the Nations in 2001 and Charge!: Great Cavalry Charges of the Napoleonic Wars in 2003. His Greenhill Napoleonic Wars Data Book: Actions and Losses in Personnel, Colours, Standards and Artillery, 1792–1815 (1998) is considered a standard for French Revolutionary War and Napoleonic War historians, re-enactors, and hobbyists.

== Personal life ==
Smith was born 15 January 1935, at the Louise Margaret Military Hospital in Aldershot, Hampshire. His father, George Frederick Smith, was a corporal in the 2nd Infantry Division Signals regiment. In 1937, he was posted to India in the 9th Infantry Division (India) Signals Regiment on the Afghan border in Quetta, Baluchistan. The 1935 Quetta earthquake devastated the area, and the family lived in a tent. At the outbreak of war in 1939, his father was commissioned and posted to Malaya, where, in 1941, he took part in the fighting near Kota Baru. Eventually he was captured at Singapore, and was one of the 60,000 Allied POWs who built the Burma-Siam railway.

Returning in 1942 to Aldershot, Digby Smith was sent, first, to East End Primary School, where he won a Scholarship to Farnborough Grammar School. After the war, in another stint in India and Pakistan, the family journeyed to Rawalpindi, Pakistan. George Smith, now a major, was seconded to the Pakistan Signal Corps. In the absence of adequate schools, 13-year-old Digby attended the Pakistan School of Signals near the Lalkurti Bazaar, where he received his first training in electronics.

Smith married Rita Prime in 1961, and they had three sons. He divorced in 1984, and married a second time to a nurse, Edna Bluck he had met in Saudi Arabia.

Digby Smith died on 9 January 2024, at the age of 89.

== Military career ==
In 1950, he returned to England and school, but left Farnborough Grammar School at the age of 16 to the army as an apprentice telecommunications technician. He received additional training at Minden in 1954 as a Technician III Class. After a six-month stint at the Pintsch Electro Radio Factory in Constance, Smith returned to Duisburg, where he met his wife.

In 1960, the war office selection board sent him to Mons Officer Cadet School at Aldershot, and he received his commission as a lieutenant in 10th Signal Regiment, posted in Krefeld, in North Rhine-Westphalia, Germany. Here he was a Troop Commander using the same Pintch equipment he had studied in Constance. In 1961, he received a commission into the Royal Corps of Signals, and served in the British Army of the Rhine. While in service there, he studied German, and explored his growing interest in the military history of the old German states of the Holy Roman Empire.

Smith's first foray into the realm of Napoleonic history occurred by chance at Bradbury Barracks in Krefeld. As a qualified linguist, he was asked to research the history of the barracks' original German regiment, part of the Signals' 20th anniversary at the location. His research led him to the 2nd Westphalian Hussars, who in turn were descended from the green- and purple-clad Cheaveau Legers Uhlanen of Duchy of Berg. This colourful regiment had as its founder the equally colourful Joachim Murat, King of Naples and a Marshal of France under Napoleon.

In 1965, he transferred to the Royal Army Ordnance Corps, where he worked in computers and logistics and the study of work. From 1970 to 1972, he had a stint at the German Armed Forces Command and Staff College, located at Blankenese, near Hamburg.

== Post-military ==
After serving a brief stint at the Ministry of Defence, Whitehall, he retired from the military to start a new career, selling body armour to the German police, who were at that time combating the Baader Meinhof and other urban terrorist groups. In 1981, high tech logistics and customer services markets drew him into international computer and telecommunications companies located in Germany, Saudi Arabia and Moscow. During his assignment to Moscow, where he spent four years, he made several trips to the battlefield at Borodino, and continued developing the material for his compendium, Napoleonic Wars Data Book.

From 1995, he concentrated full-time on the writing of military history, some of which he wrote for Osprey Military Publishing under the nom de plume of Otto von Pivka.

== Publications by Digby Smith ==
Smith's work in the Osprey series, Men at War, already had received considerable interest from Napoleonic war enthusiasts, hobbyists and re-enactors when Greenhill published Napoleonic Wars Data Book. It was a 20-year project, about which Smith commented, "This is the largest and most complex book that I have produced to date and without having committed the last few years to full time, solid research and presentation this work would never have been written." In this massive volume (582 pages, large format, 264 x 204mm–nearly A4 size), Smith compiled the available statistics of nearly every exchange of gunfire of the French Revolutionary Wars and the Napoleonic Wars, close to 2000 engagements, including those in Europe, Egypt, Palestine, and Syria. The result was a highly specialised reference book that listed, in chronological order, the battles, skirmishes and actions of nearly 25 years of worldwide warfare, making it a standard starting place for Napoleonic War battle research. It also includes the forces involved, the commanders, ranks, names and types of units, and the occasional comment on the battle.

The Data Book cemented Smith's reputation as a Napoleonic enthusiast, although not necessarily as a scholar. His first foray into narrative historical writing, 1813 Leipzig, met with mixed reviews. On the one hand, Smith included interesting first-person narrative accounts of the four-day battle at Leipzig, and this was considered the main strength of his work. On the other hand, however, the contextualising of the first-person accounts was less accurate, and in particular the first two chapters were marred by frequent factual errors. Filled with absorbing accounts of the battle and people's responses to it, Smith's book was considered an interesting read for students of military history, but not necessarily a scholarly contribution to Napoleonic studies.

Smith's more recent Charge adopted some of the same stylistic elements. After explaining how mounted units formed, trained, and operated, Smith focuses on 13 specific battles to illustrate how cavalry could and did turn the tide in several engagements such as Austerlitz, Eylau, Borodino, Albuera, Marengo, and Waterloo, Liebertwolkwitz and Möckern, and the Allied raids on France in 1813.

=== As Otto von Pivka ===
- Pivka, Otto von. The Black Brunswickers. London: Osprey, 1973.
- Pivka, Otto von. The armies of Europe today. 1974.
- Pivka, Otto von. The King's German Legion. London: Osprey, 1974.
- Pivka, Otto von. The Armies of Europe To-Day. Berkshire: Osprey, 1974.
- Pivka, Otto von. Napoleon's Polish Troops. 1974.
- Pivka, Otto von. The King's German Legion. Men-at-arms series. Reading: Osprey Publishing, 1974.
- Pivka, Otto von, and Michael P. Roffe. Napoleon's German Allies. Reading: Osprey Publishing, 1975.
- Pivka, Otto von, and M. Roffe. Spanish Armies of the Napoleonic Wars. London: Osprey, 1975.
- Pivka, Otto von, and M. Roffe. Napoleon's German Allies (1). Westfalia and Kleve-Berg. London: Osprey, 1975.
- Pivka, Otto von. Spanish Armies of the Napoleonic Wars. London: Osprey Publishing, 1975.
- Pivka, Otto von, and Michael P. Roffe. Spanish armies of the Napoleonic Wars. London: Osprey, 1975.
- Pivka, Otto von, and G. A. Embleton. Napoleon's German Allies 2 Nassau & Oldenburg. Men-at-arms series, 43. London: Osprey Pub, 1976.
- Pivka, Otto von. Napoleon's German Allies (2). Nassau and Oldenburg. London: Osprey, 1976.
- Pivka, Otto von. Napoleon's German allies (2): Nassau and Oldenburg. London: Osprey, 1976.
- Pivka, Otto von. The French Army Including Foreign Regiments in French Service and the Confederation of the Rhine. Cambridge: Stephens, 1977.
- Pivka, Otto von. Armies of 1812. Vol.1, The French Army Including Foreign Regiments in French Service and the Confederation of the Rhine. Cambridge: Stephens, 1977.
- Pivka, Otto von. Armies of 1812, Bd. I: The French Army Including Foreign Regiments in French Service and the Confederation of the Rhine. Cambridge: Patric Stephens, 1977.
- Pivka, Otto von. The Portuguese Army of the Napoleonic Wars. Men-at-arms series. London: Osprey, 1977.
- Pivka, Otto von. The Portuguese Army of the Napoleonic Wars. London: Osprey, 1977.
- Pivka, Otto von. Armies of 1812. Cambridge: Stephens, 1977.
- (in German) Pivka, Otto von, and Gerry A. Embleton. Napoleons Verbündete in Deutschland 2, Nassau und Oldenburg / G. A. Embleton (Farbtaf.). Bonn: Wehr und Wissen, 1979.
- Pivka, Otto von. Napoleon's Italian and Neapolitan Troops. London: Osprey Publishing, 1979.
- (in German) Pivka, Otto von, and Michael Roffe. Napoleons Verbündete in Deutschland 1, Westfalen und Kleve-Berg / Michael Roffe (Farbtaf.). Bonn: Wehr und Wissen, 1979.
- Pivka, Otto von. Armies of the Napoleonic Era. Newton Abbey: David & Charles, 1979.
- (in German) Pivka, Otto von. Nassau und Oldenburg. Armeen und Waffen, 2. Bonn: Wehr u. Wissen Verl, 1979.
- Pivka, Otto von. Navies of the Napoleonic Era. David and Charles, 1980.

=== As Digby Smith ===
- Smith, Digby George, and Angus McBride. The British Army, 1965–80: Combat and Service Dress. Men-at-arms series. London: Osprey Publishing, 1977.
- Smith, Digby George. Army uniforms. 1980.
- Smith, Digby George. Army Uniforms Since 1945. Poole [Eng.]: Blandford Press, 1980.
- Smith, Digby George. The Greenhill Napoleonic Wars Data Book. London: Greenhill Books, Mechanicsburg, PA: Stackpole Books, 1998.
- Smith, Digby George. Borodino. Moreton-in-Marsh, Gloucestershire: Windrush, 1998.
- Smith, Digby George. Napoleon's Regiments: Battle Histories of the Regiments of the French Army, 1792–1815. London: Greenhill Books, 2000.
- Smith, Digby George. Napoleon's Regiments: Battle Histories of the Regiments of the French Army, 1792–1815. London [u.a.]: Greenhill Books [u.a.], 2000.
- Smith, Digby George. 1813: Leipzig : Napoleon and the Battle of the Nations. London: Greenhill books, 2001.
- Smith, Digby George. 1813, Leipzig: Napoleon and the Battle of the Nations. London: Greenhill Books, 2001.
- Smith, Digby George. 1813: Leipzig; Napoleon and the Battle of the Nations. London: Greenhill, 2001.
- Smith, Digby George. Armies of 1812: The Grand Armeé and the Armies of Austria, Prussia, Russia and Turkey. Staplehurst: Spellmount, 2002.
- Smith, Digby George. Charge!: Great Cavalry Charges of the Napoleonic Wars. London: Greenhill, 2003.
- Smith, Digby George. Navies of the Napoleonic Era. Atglen, PA: Schiffer Pub, 2004.
- Smith, Digby George. Napoleon against Russia: A Concise History of 1812. Barnsley: Pen & Sword Military, 2004.
- Smith, Digby George. Armies of the Napoleonic Era. Atglen, PA: Schiffer Pub, 2004.
- Smith, Digby George. Napoleon against Russia: A New History of 1812. Barnsley: Pen & Sword Military, 2004.
- Smith, Digby George. The Prussian Army to 1815. Atglen, PA: Schiffer Pub, 2004.
- Smith, Digby George. Napoleon against Russia: A New History of 1812. Barnsley: Pen & Sword Military, 2004.
- Smith, Digby George. Napoleon against Russia: A Concise History of 1812. Barnsley: Pen & Sword Military, 2004.
- Smith, Digby George. Uniforms of the Napoleonic Wars. London: Lorenz, 2005.
- Smith, Digby George. The Decline and Fall of Napoleon's Empire: How the Emperor Self-Destructed. London: Greenhill Books [u.a.], 2005.
- (in Polish) Smith, Digby George, and Mariusz Olczak. Lipsk 1813. Seria Napoleońska. Gdańsk: Finna, 2005.
- Smith, Digby George, and Jeremy Black. An Illustrated Encyclopedia of Uniforms of the Napoleonic Wars: An Expert, in-Depth Reference to the Officers and Soldiers of the Revolutionary and Napoleonic Period, 1792–1815. Illustrated encyclopaedia. London: Lorenz, 2006.
- Smith, Digby George. Armies of 1812: The Grand Armée and the Armies of Austria, Prussia, Russia and Turkey. Staplehurst: Spellmount, 2007.
- Smith, Digby George, Kevin F. Kiley, and Jeremy Black. An Illustrated Encyclopedia of Uniforms from 1775–1783, the American Revolutionary War: An Expert Guide to the Uniforms of the American Militias and Continental Army, the Armies and Navies of Great Britain and France, German and Spanish Units, and American Indian Allies. London: Lorenz Books, 2008.
- Smith, Digby. Armies of the Seven Years' War: Commanders, Equipment, Uniforms and Strategies of the 'First World War.' Stroud: The History Press, 2013.
