= Fuente de Cantos =

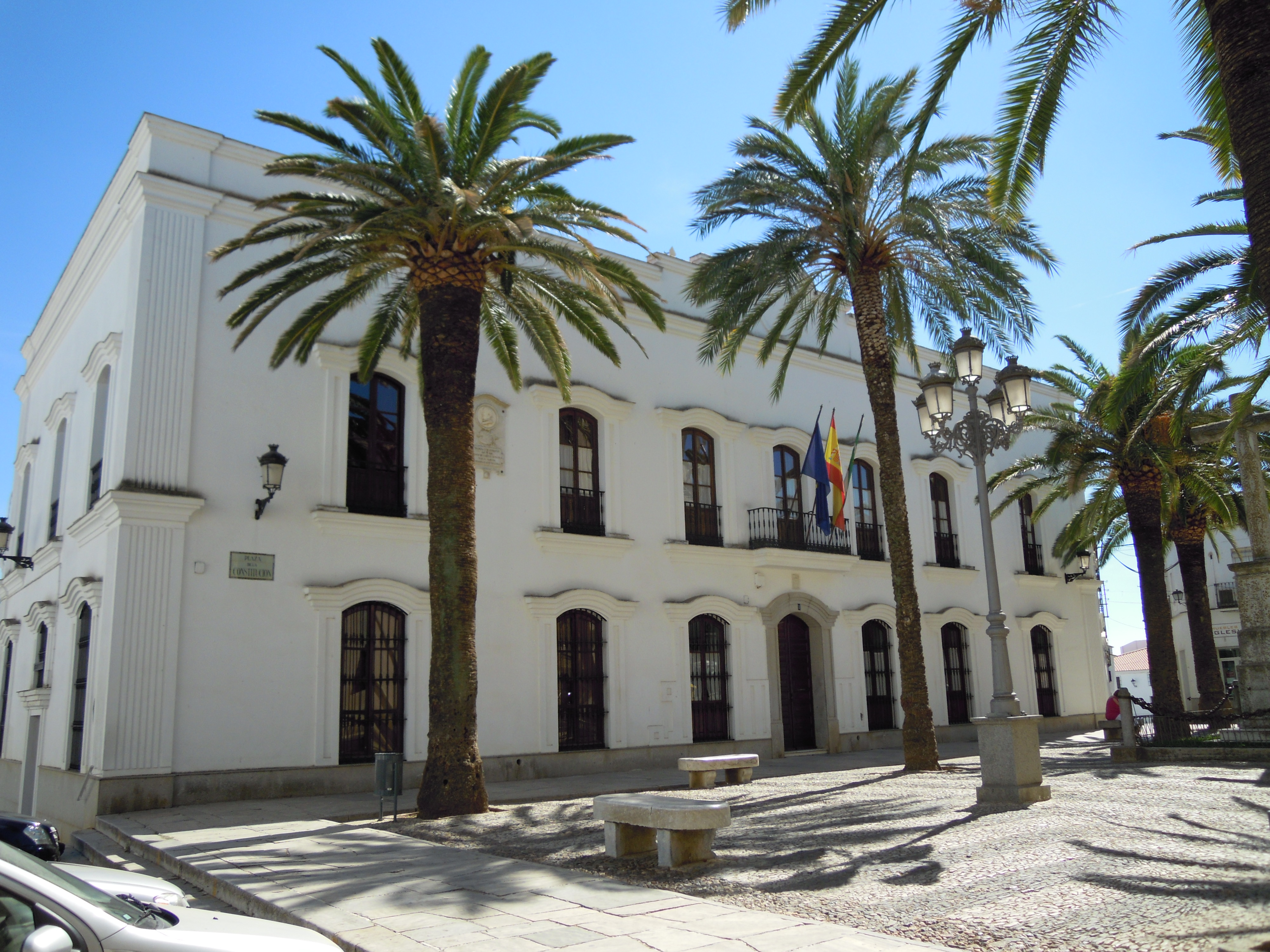
- Town hall

- Coat of arms

- Location of Fuente de Cantos within Extremadura
- Coordinates: 38°14′48″N 6°18′33″W
- Country: Spain
- Autonomous community: Extremadura
- Province: Badajoz
- Comarca: Tentudía
- Judicial district: Zafra

Government
  - Mayor: Maximina Delgado Berjano

Area
  - Total: 251 km^{2} (97 sq mi)
- Elevation: 582 m (1,909 ft)

Population (2025-01-01)
  - Total: 4,583
  - Density: 18.3/km^{2} (47.3/sq mi)
- Time zone: UTC+1 (CET)
  - Summer (DST): UTC+2 (CEST)
- Website: Official website

Fuente de Cantos (Extremaduran: Huenti de Cantus) is a municipality located in the province of Badajoz, Extremadura, Spain.

== Location ==
The town is located on the old road N-630, now highway A-66, about 100 kilometers from Badajoz and about 80 kilometers from the regional capital, Mérida.

== History ==
=== Spanish Civil War ===
In 1934 the mayor of the town was a Socialist by the name of Modesto José Lorenzana. He was known for his humanitarian efforts to improve the town. He was instrumental in using resources to improve the local water supplies. He also used municipal funds to buy food to alleviate the hunger of unemployed families within the district. During this period, and as preludes to the far rights moves to destabilize the democratic republican government of Spain, Salazar Alonso intervened in local democracy. In June 1934 the Civil Governor along with members of the Civil Guard and representatives of local right wing organizations accused Modesto José Lorenzana of misuse of public funds, and on these grounds and with dubious legal process removed him from office of Mayor. José Lorenzana was later murdered in September 1936.

== Economic activity ==
The main source of income for the town is agricultural with the surrounding countryside used for the growing of crops and Animal husbandry.

== Notable features ==
=== Parish church ===
The parish church of 'Our Lady of Granada' is in the Archdiocese of Mérida-Badajoz and dates from the 15th century and has been built in the Baroque style of architecture. The highlight of the church is the altarpiece which is the work of Manuel Garcia de Santiago.

== Notable people ==
Francisco de Zurbarán (1598–1664), painter

== See also ==
- List of municipalities in Badajoz
