= Bodonal de la Sierra =

- municipality
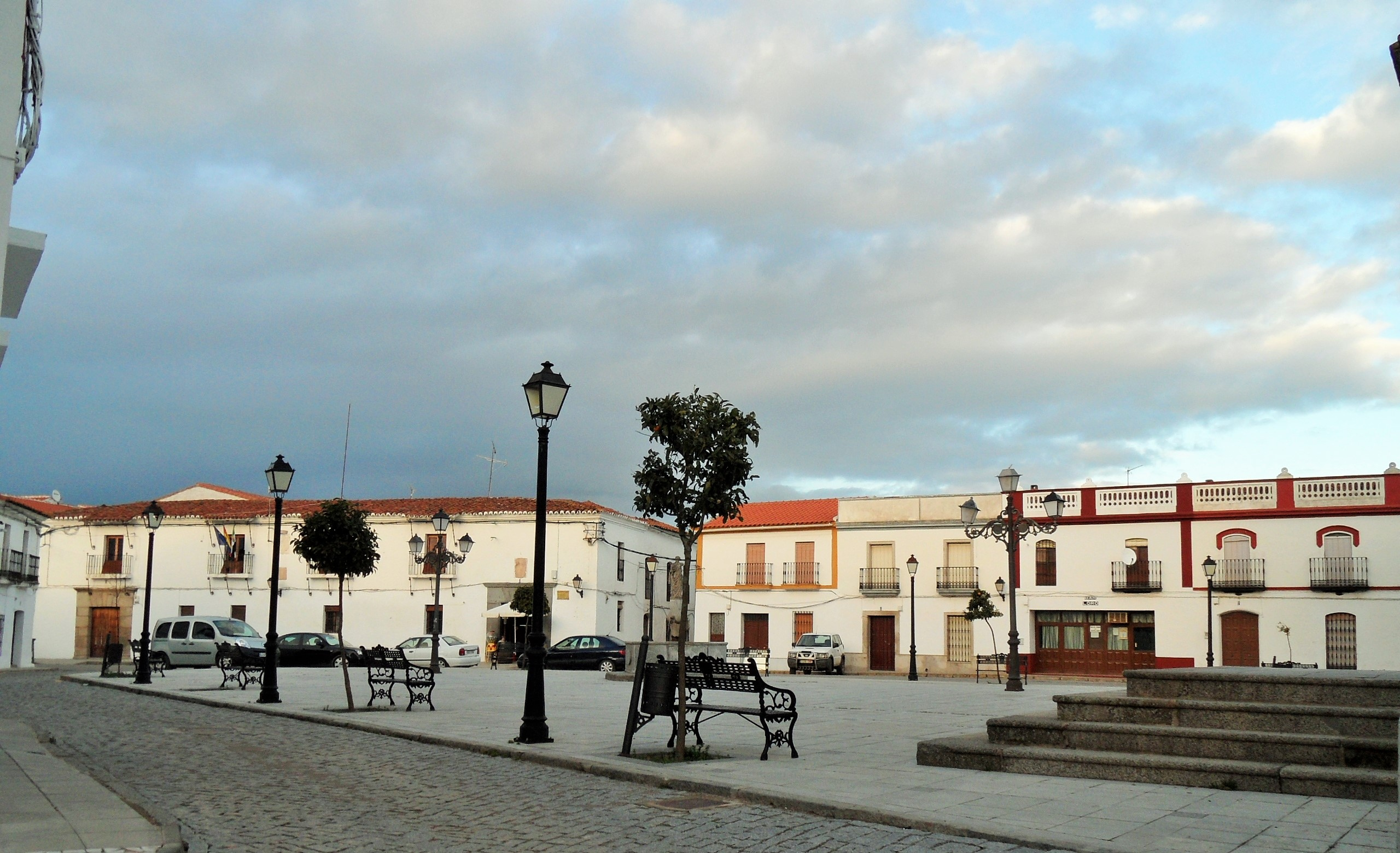

- Coat of arms

- Location of Bodonal de la Sierra within Extremadura
- Coordinates: 38°8′54″N 6°33′36″W
- Country: Spain
- Autonomous community: Extremadura
- Province: Badajoz
- Comarca: Tentudía
- Judicial district: Fregenal de la Sierra

Government
  - Mayor: Francisco Javier Arroyo Patrón

Area
  - Total: 68 km^{2} (26 sq mi)
- Elevation: 611 m (2,005 ft)

Population (2025-01-01)
  - Total: 982
  - Density: 14/km^{2} (37/sq mi)
- Demonym: Bonalejos or Bodonaleros
- Time zone: UTC+1 (CET)
  - Summer (DST): UTC+2 (CEST)
- Website: Official website

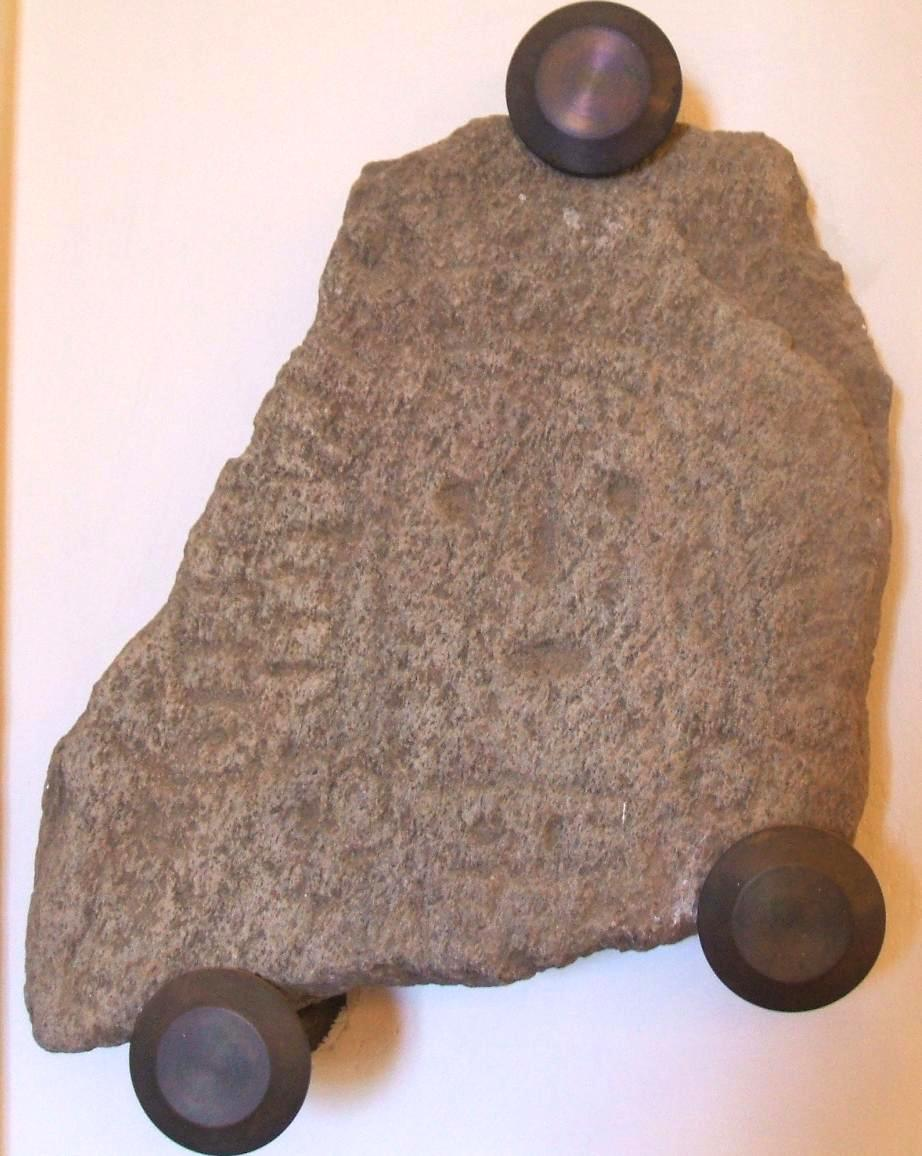
Iberian stele

Bodonal de la Sierra is a municipality located in the province of Badajoz, Extremadura, Spain.

== See also ==
- List of municipalities in Badajoz
