= Siege of Mainz (1814) =

1814 siege during the War of the Sixth Coalition

- Part of the German campaign of the Sixth Coalition
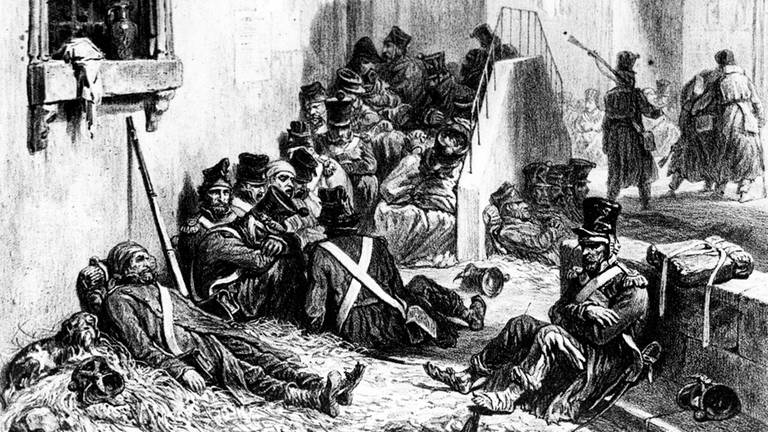
- French soldiers fell ill with typhus.
Date	3 January – 4 May 1814
Location	Mainz, Mont-Tonnerre, France 50°00′00″N 8°16′00″E
Result	Inconclusive (see Aftermath)

Belligerents
(First French Empire) France	(Russian Empire) Russia; Berg (Duchy of Nassau) Nassau

Commanders and leaders
(First French Empire) Charles Morand (First French Empire) Armand Charles Guilleminot (First French Empire) Jean-Baptiste Pierre de Semellé	(Russian Empire) Louis Alexandre de Langeron (Duchy of Nassau) Ernest III

Strength
31,000; 46 guns	30,000

Casualties and losses
19,000	Unknown
- Location within Europe

The siege of Mainz (3 January – 4 May 1814) saw an Imperial French corps under Charles Antoine Morand besieged in Mainz Fortress by an Imperial Russian corps led by Louis Alexandre Andrault de Langeron. When the Russians left in February 1814, they were replaced by the V German Corps, led by Duke Ernest of Saxe-Coburg and made up of the soldiers from the County of Nassau, the Duchy of Berg and several other minor German states. The French were far too strong for the Allies to directly attack the fortress. However, an outbreak of typhus ravaged the city. Despite the epidemic, Morand did not surrender the city until the news of Napoleon's abdication arrived.

== Garrison ==
At the beginning of January 1814, Morand's IV Corps consisted of the 1st Division led by François Étienne Damas, the 13th Division commanded by Armand Charles Guilleminot and the 51st Division directed by Jean-Baptiste Pierre de Semellé. Damas' division counted 169 officers and 1,748 men in the brigades of Schweitzer and Jean-Baptiste Estève de Latour. Guilleminot's division included 187 officers and 2,438 men in the brigades of Antoine Gruyer, Jean-Marie Vergez and Annet Morio de L'Isle. Semellé's division numbered 246 officers and 3,837 men in the brigades of Antoine Aymard and Henri-Jacques-Martin Lagarde. The artillery reserve was under Albert Louis Valentin Taviel who had charge of six 12-pound cannons, twenty-eight 6-pound cannons and twelve 24-pound howitzers. There were elements of seven cavalry regiments but the main mounted strength was 1,033 men of the 2nd Honor Guards Regiment.

== Aftermath ==
Of the original garrison of 31,000 men, only 12,000 men survived. Most of the deaths were from typhus.
