= Argenta Gap War Cemetery =

CWGC cemetery in Emilia-Romagna, Italy

Coordinates: 44.6341°N 11.8319°E

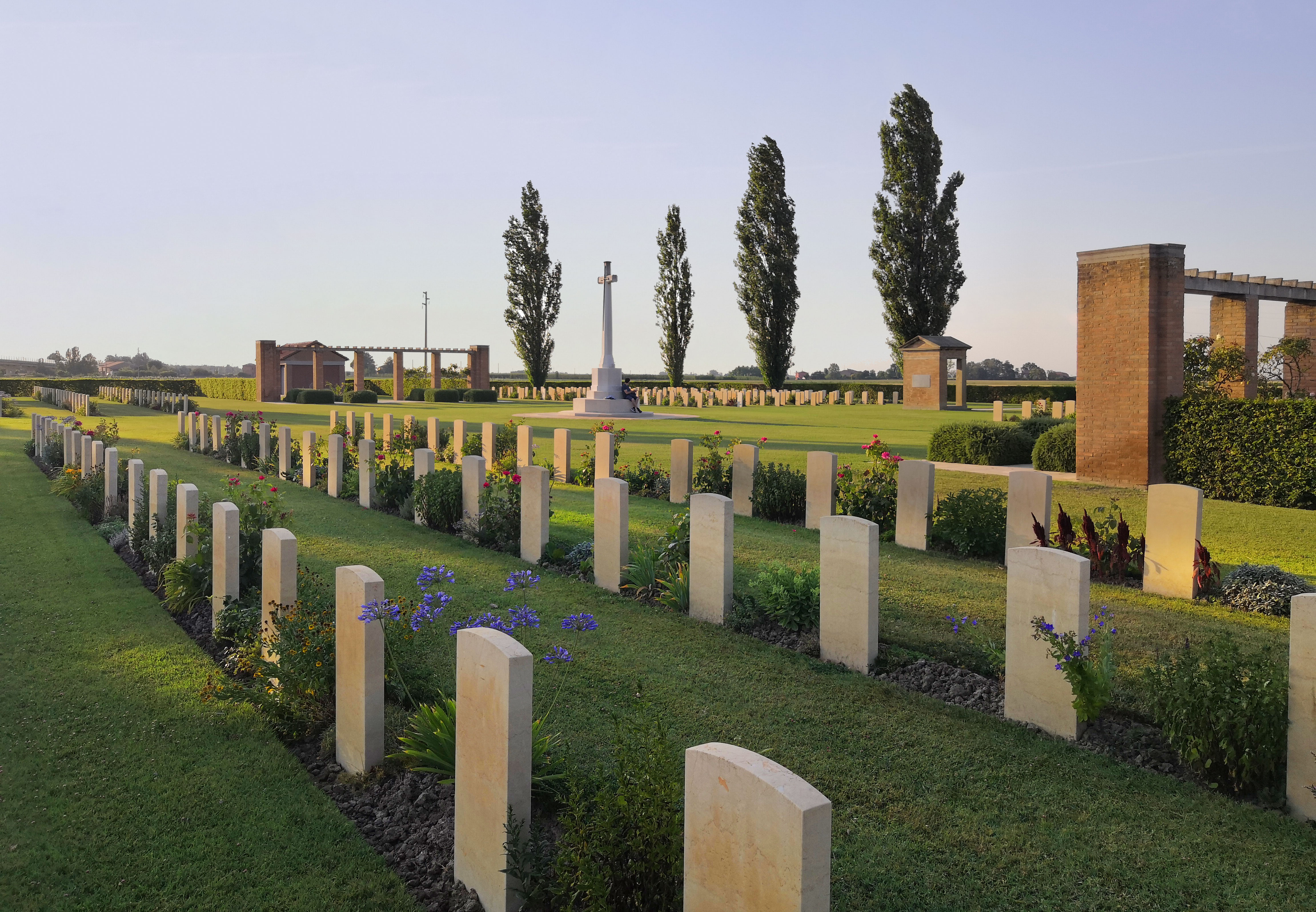
Argenta Gap War Cemetery

The Argenta War Cemetery is a Commonwealth War Graves Commission and is found in the Commune of Argenta, Ferrara, Italy. The town of Argenta is located two kilometres south.

The cemetery holds many soldiers killed in the battles of Argenta Gap and Lake Comacchio. The British authorities established the cemetery shortly after the end of World War II. There are 625 soldiers buried there.

== Notable burials ==
- Arthur Banks GC (1923–1944)
- Tom Hunter (VC) (1923–1945)
- Anders Lassen VC, MC & Two Bars (1920–1945)
