= Jean-Baptiste Pierre de Semellé =

French division commander

Jean-Baptiste de Semellé
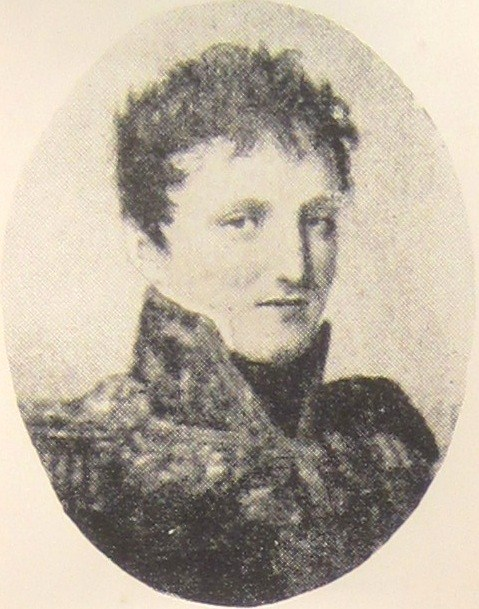
- Jean-Baptiste de Semellé
- Born: 16 June 1773; Metz, France
- Died: 25 January 1839 (aged 65) Courcelles-Chaussy, Moselle, France
- Allegiance: France
- Branch: Infantry
- Service years: (France) 1791–1815
- Rank: General of Division
- Conflicts: War of the First Coalition; Siege of Thionville; War of the Fourth Coalition; Battle of Golymin; Battle of Eylau; Peninsular War; Battle of Bornos; War of the Sixth Coalition; Battle of Leipzig; Siege of Mainz
- Awards: Légion d'Honneur
- Other work: Baron of the Empire, 1808; Deputy, 1822, 1830, 1834

Jean-Baptiste Pierre de Semellé (French pronunciation: [ʒɑ̃ batist pjɛʁ də səmɛle]; 16 June 1773 – 25 January 1839) became a French division commander during the Napoleonic Wars. He joined a volunteer regiment in 1791 and fought at Thionville in 1792. He was named commander of an infantry demi-brigade in 1800. He led his regiment at Golymin in 1806 and Eylau in 1807. He was promoted general of brigade in 1807. After being transferred to Spain, he was promoted general of division in 1811. He led his troops at Bornos in 1811. He commanded a division at Leipzig in 1813 and at Mainz in 1814. He was elected a deputy in 1822 and remained in politics until 1837. His surname is one of the names inscribed under the Arc de Triomphe, on Column 35.
