= Tynecastle High School =

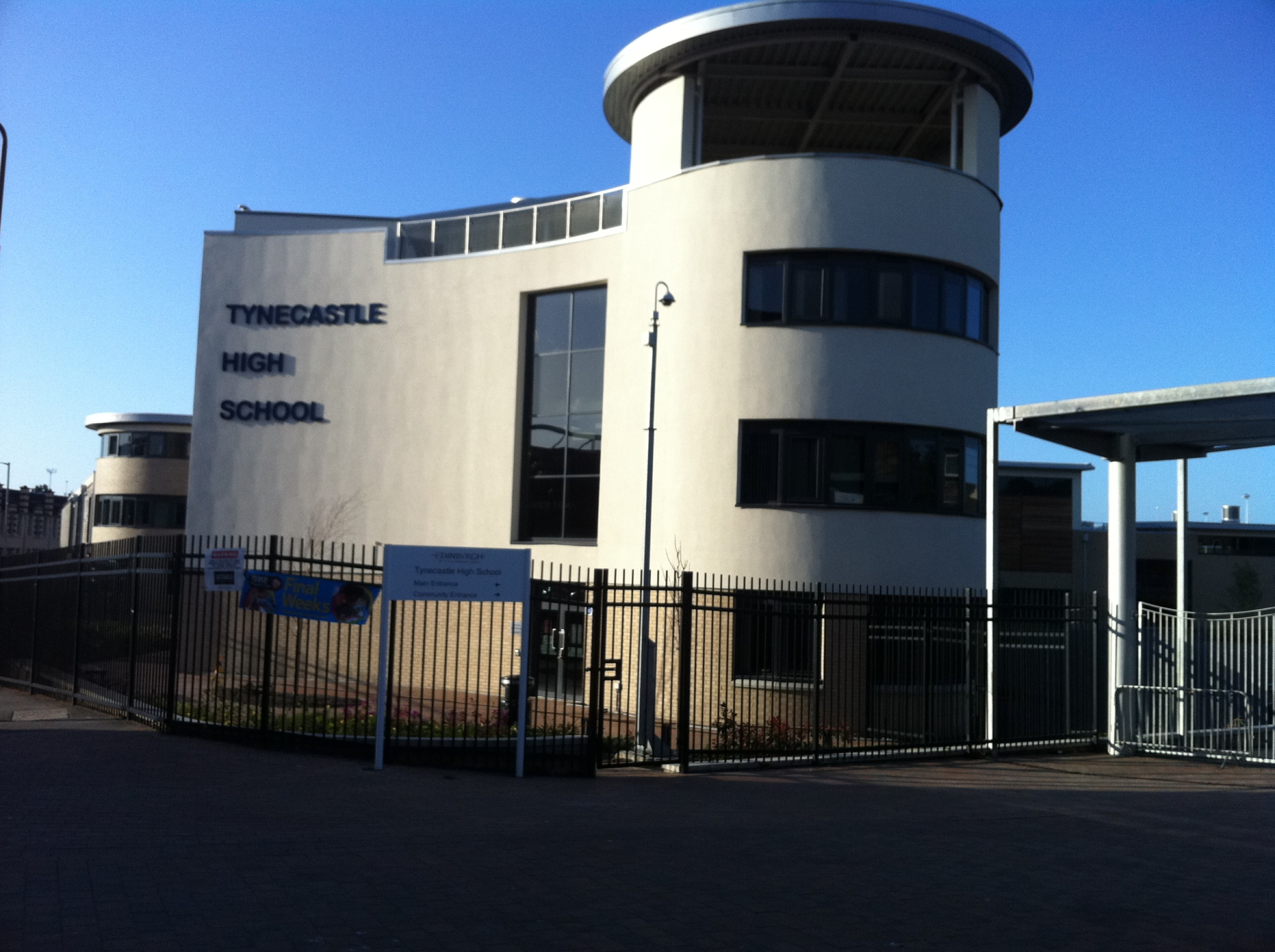

Location
- 2 McLeod Street; Edinburgh, EH11 2ND; Scotland; 55°56′20.93″N 3°13′47.91″W

Information
- Type: State school
- Established: 1912; 114 years ago
- Head teacher: Hazel Kinnear
- Gender: Co-educational
- Enrolment: 548 (2017)
- Campus type: Urban
- Colours: Silver and blue
- Website: www.tynecastlehighschool.org.uk

Tynecastle High School is a secondary school in the Gorgie area of south west Edinburgh, Scotland.

== History ==
=== Old school building ===
Tynecastle High School was opened in 1912 and was for its first 98 years located at 15 McLeod Street, a B listed building.

On 1 April 2007, The City of Edinburgh Council gave the go ahead to rebuild Tynecastle High School in a different area of McLeod Street. The council approved the sale of the old school building and a nearby nursery to the neighbouring Heart of Midlothian football team. The deal was for the sum of £5.9 million.

The Liberal Democrats / Scottish National Party coalition that took over The City of Edinburgh Council in May 2007 signalled their plan to fight any move to demolish the old school building. Council Leader Jenny Dawe said "I can't see any way that they would get permission to knock it down. It's important for the city that we don't have a repeat of the 1960s when a lot of fine buildings were knocked down and replaced by horrible multi-storey blocks." This school is also a B-listed building and any permission for it to be altered can only be done with the permission of both the council and Historic Scotland.

Previous Hearts owner Vladimir Romanov intended to build a luxury hotel, sports bars and shops alongside a new main stand for Tynecastle Stadium with a 12,000 capacity. In August 2007 it was reported that the old school would "remain untouched" in the redevelopment. Planning permission for the conversion of the old building into student accommodation was granted in 2023.

=== New school building ===
A new purpose built school was built across the road at no 2 McLeod Street and opened in January 2010.

== Notable alumni ==
- Keith Brown, politician
- Ewen Cameron
- Jason Cummings, professional footballer
- Paul Hanlon, professional footballer
- Tom Hunter, recipient of the Victoria Cross
- Ian Richardson an actor who played Francis Urquhart in the BBC adaption of House of Cards. His time at the school was not a happy one though. "It would be very different now but then I don't think they had a clue what to do with me, they certainly didn't understand me. I cannot remember having any friends there either. I hated it."
- George Thomson, footballer
- Richard Thomson (politician), Member of Parliament for Gordon

== Notable former teachers ==
- Wilfred Owen, the First World War poet taught at Tynecastle when he was a patient at Craiglockhart Hospital. His spell at the school lasted three weeks in 1917. Owen praised the school in his published letters (1967).

== Arms ==
Coat of arms of Tynecastle High School

Notes
granted 31 May 1966
Escutcheon
Per pale Argent and Azure, a castle of two towers flagged each with postern and window, and portcullis raised, all counterchanged, and in chief a rose also counterchanged, and in base a crescent likewise counterchanged.
