= Calera de León =

- Coat of arms

- Location of Calera de León within Extremadura
- Coordinates: 38°05′N 06°20′W
- Country: Spain
- Autonomous community: Extremadura
- Province: Badajoz
- Municipality: Calera de León

Area
  - Total: 69.2 km^{2} (26.7 sq mi)
- Elevation: 710 m (2,330 ft)

Population (2025-01-01)
  - Total: 912
  - Density: 13.2/km^{2} (34.1/sq mi)
- Time zone: UTC+1 (CET)
  - Summer (DST): UTC+2 (CEST)
- Website: www.caleradeleon.es

Calera de León is a municipality located in the province of Badajoz, Extremadura, Spain. According to the 2008 census (INE), the municipality has a population of 1,070 inhabitants.

== Geography ==
=== Location ===
The municipality is situated on a hill, in a region which has numerous hills and mountains, of which the highest in the province of Badajoz is Tentudía Mount, with 1,104m.

== History ==
During the Arab domination it was called Al-Caxera, meaning white.

During the reconquest of Seville by Fernando III, King El Santo instructed the Grand Master of the Order of Santiago, Paio Peres Correia, to attack a Saracen army located in the mountain passes, which led to a decisive victory, which led to the captain shouting "Santa Maria stop your day," which has led to a tradition that the sun stood still on the horizon, as in biblical times, to allow Christians the coveted victory. In memory of this miracle the master ordered a temple be built atop the highest mountain, which was elevated to the status of monastery by Pope Leo X in 1514. The construction of this temple, which gave the town large amounts of revenue, led to Calera de León becoming one of the most significant towns of the Order of Santiago.

Until 1873 Calera de León belonged to the diocese of Priory of San Marcos de Leon.

== Monuments ==
=== St. James Church ===
St. James Church is constructed of masonry, brick and stone masonry. The facade is quite irregular, showing a volumetric composition where there is a spiral staircase.

The nave is covered with a star-shaped vault, resting on pilasters with semicolumns attached. The main entrance of the temple is in Renaissance style, with four Tuscan columns and empty niches between the columns. The altarpiece consists of eight paintings by Eduardo Acosta representing the four evangelists, scenes from the Battle of Tentudía, with the appearance of the Virgin Perez Correa, and the crowning of the equestrian figure of St. James. The niche is occupied by a restored wood carving of the crucified Christ dating from the 17th century. In the windows there are fleurs-de-lis representing the triumph, and the sword of the Order of Santiago. The pulpit, next to the arch, is octagonal with a granite body resting on a fluted basis, supported by a pillar of granite. At the foot of the staircase is a granite basin of holy water.

During the stay of the friars of St. Marcos de Leon the church benefited from much furniture and household goods they brought with them.

=== Tentudía Monastery ===
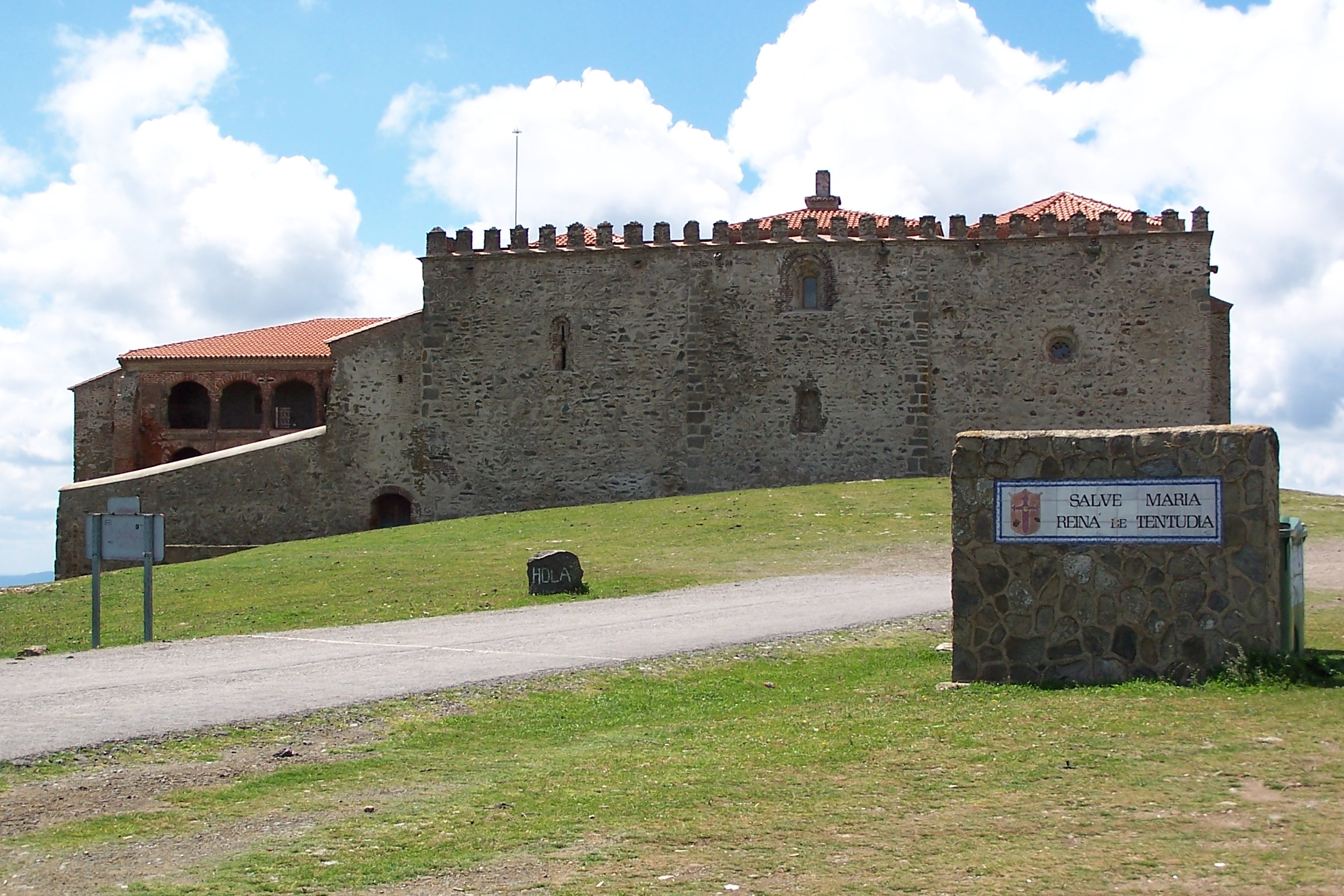
The Tentudía Monastery

The church was raised on an earlier temple built in commemoration of the legendary battle of Tentudía. It is composed of three buildings, connected by rows of stone arches, with a square chapel in the nave, and smaller ones attached to the side. The enclosure is closed with a simple wooden deck. At the end of the 14th century, two chapels were attached to the head, connected to the side aisles by a small hallway. In front of the altar there is a cartouche with the image of the Virgin and Child. The chapel of St. Augustine in its ceramic altarpiece shows the Holy Father.

The main altar, made in 1518, is considered a major part of the monastery, created by the Italian ceramist Niculoso Pisano. The style Pisano uses is Mudejar, and combines the rich harmony of color, being one of the most important ceramic assemblages of the peninsula. Its dimensions are 3.4 m high and 2.65 m wide with a total of 640 tiles. On the right side of the altar with an inscription is the tomb of the founder, Paio Peres Correia, covered with tiles of the same design and style.

The Mudejar cloister is simple and built with brick, and consists of a gallery on two floors with four sections overlapping the bottom of four arches, and the top five semicircular openings lowered. In the center is a large capacity tank. On the sides of the gallery there are rooms. Also built was a vestry and gallery, opening portals to communicate the apse with the funeral chapels. Decades later these were replaced with three naves of the church, resulting in a single nave church covered with barrel vault.

=== Conventual Santiaguista ===
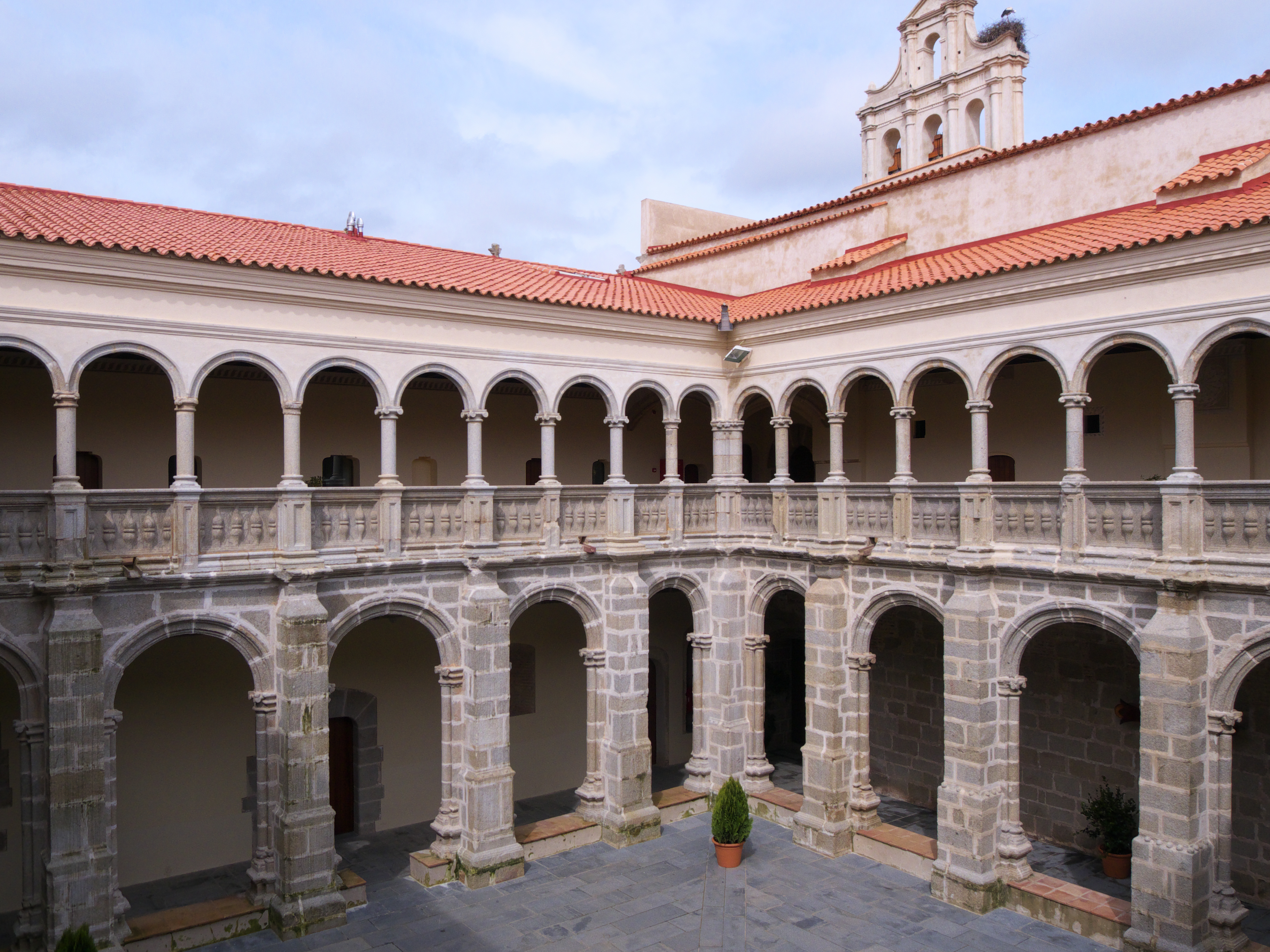
Conventual Santiaguista

The Conventual Santiaguista is a granite and masonry building, made in the late 15th century. It housed the College of San Marcos de Leon for forty years. Like the Monastery of Tentudía, the building was declared to be of National Historic and Artistic Interest in 1931. Its two-storey cloister is built with granite. From 1930 to 1934 this monument was subjected to various attempts at plunder, with the intention of smuggling the artistic stones to America.

One of its most important structures is the faculty square, divided into two overlapping stories. The bottom is formed with arches, which rest on pillars with Ionic pilasters and ornamental plots, which closes with cross vaults.

=== Hermitage of our Lady of Sorrows ===
The Hermitage of our Lady of Sorrows is designed as a chapel, or shrine, but is deeply modified by successive interventions over the centuries, especially in the Baroque period. It is small in size, with a single nave. There is a dome, the purpose of which was to protect the artistic and liturgical furnishings of the temple from frequent robberies and looting.

== Celebrations ==
=== Plgrimage of Tentudía ===
The Pilgrimage of Tentudía is a holiday that has been celebrated every September 8 since the second half of the 13th century and is over 700 years old. In the late 14th century the pilgrimage attendance exceeded more than 6,000 people. According to verified data, it can be said that the pilgrimage or Tentudía fair is one of the oldest in Spain. Every morning on September 8, the image of the Virgin Tentudía goes from the main square of the village, accompanied by countless pilgrims and pilgrims to his shrine, the Monastery of Tentudía, where crowds gather to express their devotion to their patroness. Virgin Tentudía is the patroness saint of Calera de León, and the region of Tentudía.

== In popular culture ==
In October 2007, Calera de León was selected, along with 19 other towns in the Old World, to be part of the documentary film Peoples of Europe. This makes it one of the few Spanish cities to be part of this project.

=== Other celebrations of interest ===
- 'St. Mark': from 24 to 26 April.
- 'San Isidro Labrador': 15 to 18 May.
- 'Descent of the Virgin of the Monastery Tentudía': August 15

== See also ==
- List of municipalities in Badajoz
