= Louise Margaret Hospital =

- The Louise Margaret Hospital in the 1930s

- Shown in Hampshire

Geography
- Location: Aldershot
- Coordinates: 51.2546°N 0.7543°W

Organisation
- Care system: Military
- Type: Maternity

History
- Founded: 1898
- Closed: 1995

The Louise Margaret Hospital was opened in 1898 to cater for British Army soldiers' wives and children in the military town of Aldershot Garrison. It started with fifty-three beds and about half of its cases were maternity patients. In 1958 it became the Louise Margaret Maternity Hospital, and closed in 1995. The old hospital is part of a group of historic buildings with legal protection and, as of 2016, is expected to be used in a redevelopment project.

== History ==
=== Early years ===
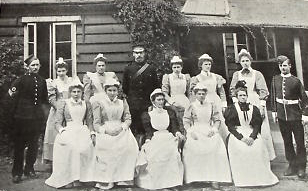
Nurses and other staff of the new hospital, 1898

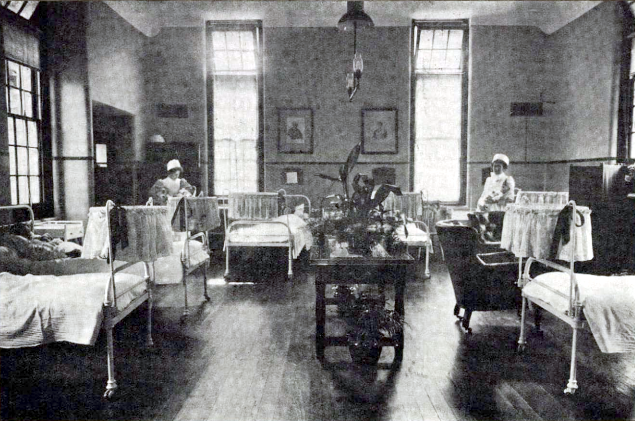
The "lying-in" or post-natal ward c1908

The Duchess of Connaught, formerly Princess Louise Margaret, laid the foundation stone for the hospital bearing her name on 1 March 1897, just as her husband, the Duke of Connaught, was taking over Aldershot Command. She declared the new building open on 25 July 1898 in a ceremony with a military band, guard of honour and a service with three clergymen. A bouquet of pink roses was presented by an officer's daughter before the Matron, Miss Hodgson, and the commanding officer, William Watson Pike, a doctor in the Royal Army Medical Corps, showed her round.

The new yellow-brick building with slate roofs echoed the construction materials used by its larger neighbour, the Cambridge Military Hospital. It cost £12,600 to build and had "sanitary blocks" incorporated in "Italianate" corner towers towards the back. There were fifty-three beds arranged in eleven wards of different sizes, including wards named for Queen Victoria, the Duke of Connaught and Lord Lansdowne. The staircases had shallow steps, supposed to help nurses in long dresses run up and down. A "fine" tiled operating theatre was added in 1908 and officially opened by the Duchess in 1909. It had a new sort of "brilliant light" and Doulton basins and sinks "fitted with the latest kind of mixing valves for hot and cold water with elbow-action and sprays". Within a couple of years the hospital was treating around 1000 cases annually: about half in its General Division and half in its Maternity Division which had twenty-five "swing cots" along with twenty-five beds.

As well as the Matron or Lady Superintendent there were fourteen nurses in 1908. All were qualified but seven of them were short-term appointees doing additional training in midwifery. The hospital was already an officially recognised midwifery training school preparing twenty nurses a year for the Central Midwives Board examination. By 1912 there were two weekly clinics: one for tooth extraction and one for "special gynaecological outpatients".

=== The 1920s and 1930s ===
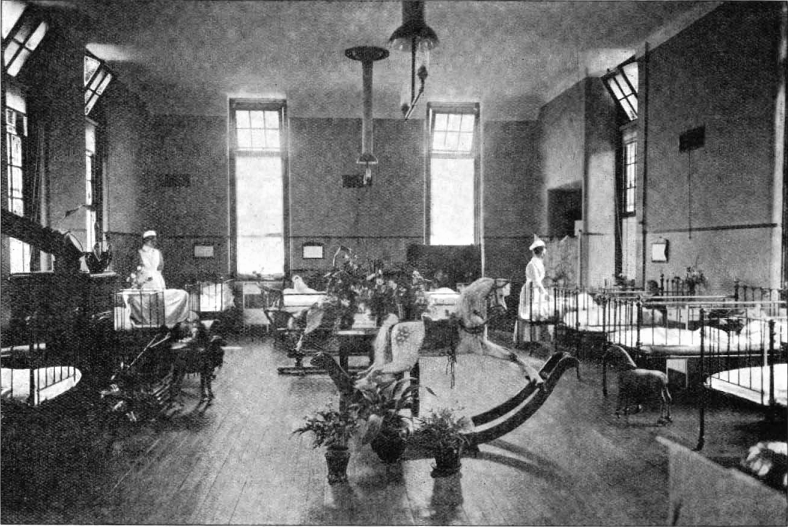
Children's ward c1908 with rocking horse

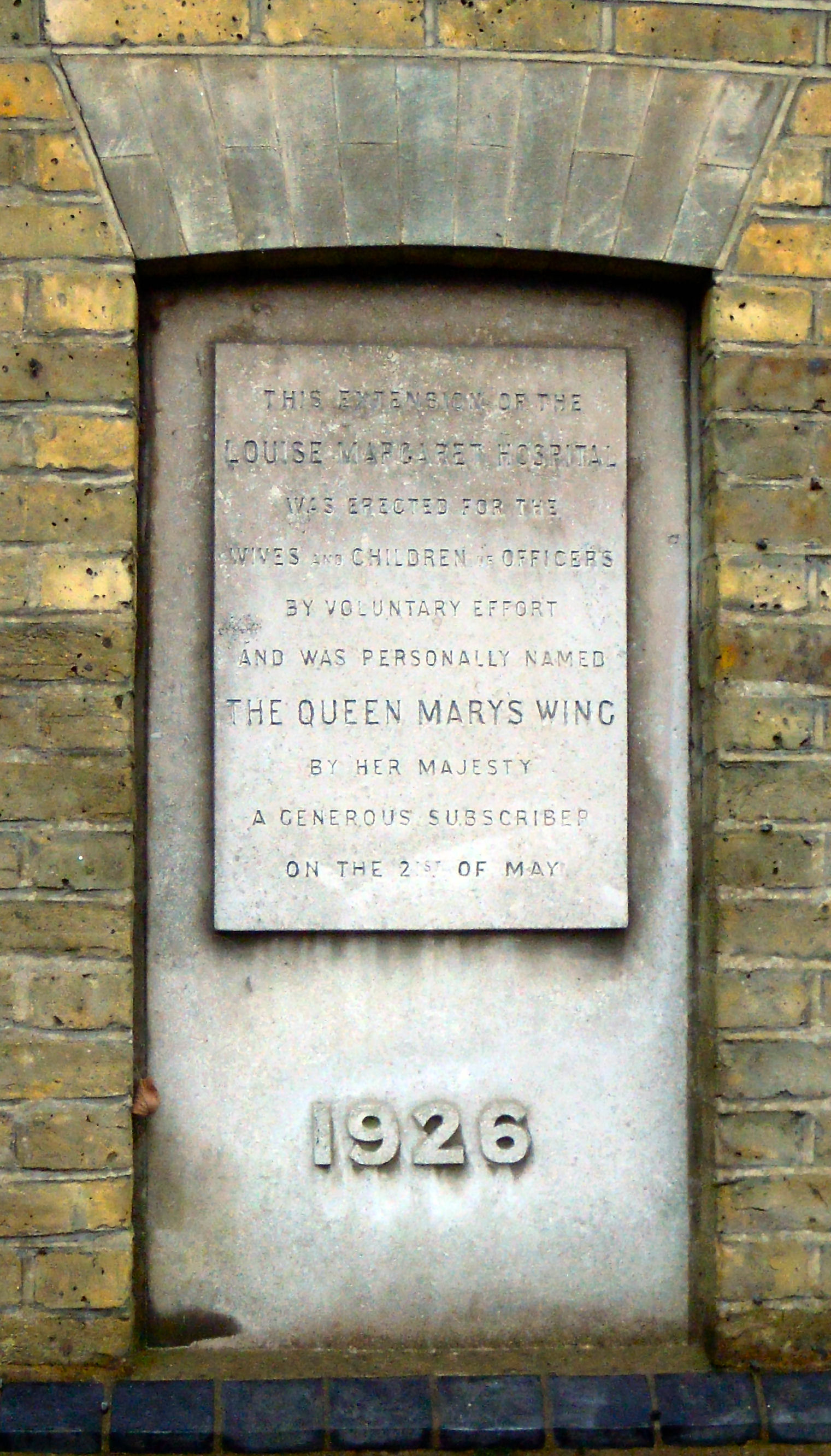
Plaque unveiled by Queen Mary on the Queen Mary Wing in 1926

A 1926 extension with rooms for officers' wives and children was intended to offer medical facilities at "moderate charges" to women of the officer class, matching what was available to their menfolk. Queen Mary was said to be interested in this new policy of the military authorities and granted permission for a new extension to be called the Queen Mary Wing. This wing was in fact two separate "unpretentious" extensions to east and west which blended in with the original building and provided accommodation for up to six women and eight children. The Queen made donations towards it: a cheque, linen and silver plate with her crest on. She also presented the hospital with a rocking horse and brass cot once used by Edward VIII. After unveiling a stone tablet in the wall and naming the new wing, she continued to visit the hospital regularly, as she had already been doing for several years. Her visits to the hospital and to a nearby children's home named after her could be combined with frequent royal visits to inspect military activities like cavalry training.

In 1928, when the British Medical Association was promoting the benefits of antenatal care, they used the Louise Margaret Hospital as a good example. In a group of 2000 women who gave birth there, all but one had had antenatal care and there were only two maternal deaths. Similar claims of successful outcomes of antenatal care at the hospital were made in 1924 by the commanding officer of the time, Edward L. Moss. 1928 was also the year that the matron, Agnes Charlotte Markwick, was awarded the Royal Red Cross. She was a member of the Queen Alexandra’s Imperial Military Nursing Service (QAIMNS). The previous decades had seen the nursing staff becoming more integrated with the QAIMNS. The matron who preceded Markwick, Edith Mary Beesby, was at the Louise Margaret by 1910, and, while still there, was made a matron of the Queen Alexandra Military Families Nursing Service in 1921.

A nurses' home was built next door in 1937 and joined to the hospital with a single-storey brick corridor. Money from the Aldershot Tattoo helped fund the hospital and other military welfare projects via the Aldershot Command Charities Trust.

=== The 1950s ===
In the early 1950s newborn babies at the hospital had a room off the maternity ward and were "all carefully numbered and ticketed". They slept in "a series of wooden trays set round the walls", according to the writer John Hay Beith. The babies' bathroom had basins where a nurse could control the water by foot, leaving both hands free for handling the baby.

In the era of the National Health Service it was no longer appropriate to charge officers' families for using the Queen Mary Wing. Not only was the "private" accommodation free but rooms were sometimes available "for the dependants of Other Ranks". Beith reported that Queen Alexandra military nurses enjoyed a posting here as a "welcome alternative to nursing men only". He also described volunteer welfare officers helping with occupational and recreational therapy.

In 1958 general nursing was discontinued and it became the Louise Margaret Maternity Hospital. Royal attention continued in this period with Queen Elizabeth The Queen Mother and Princess Margaret both visiting.

=== Recent history ===
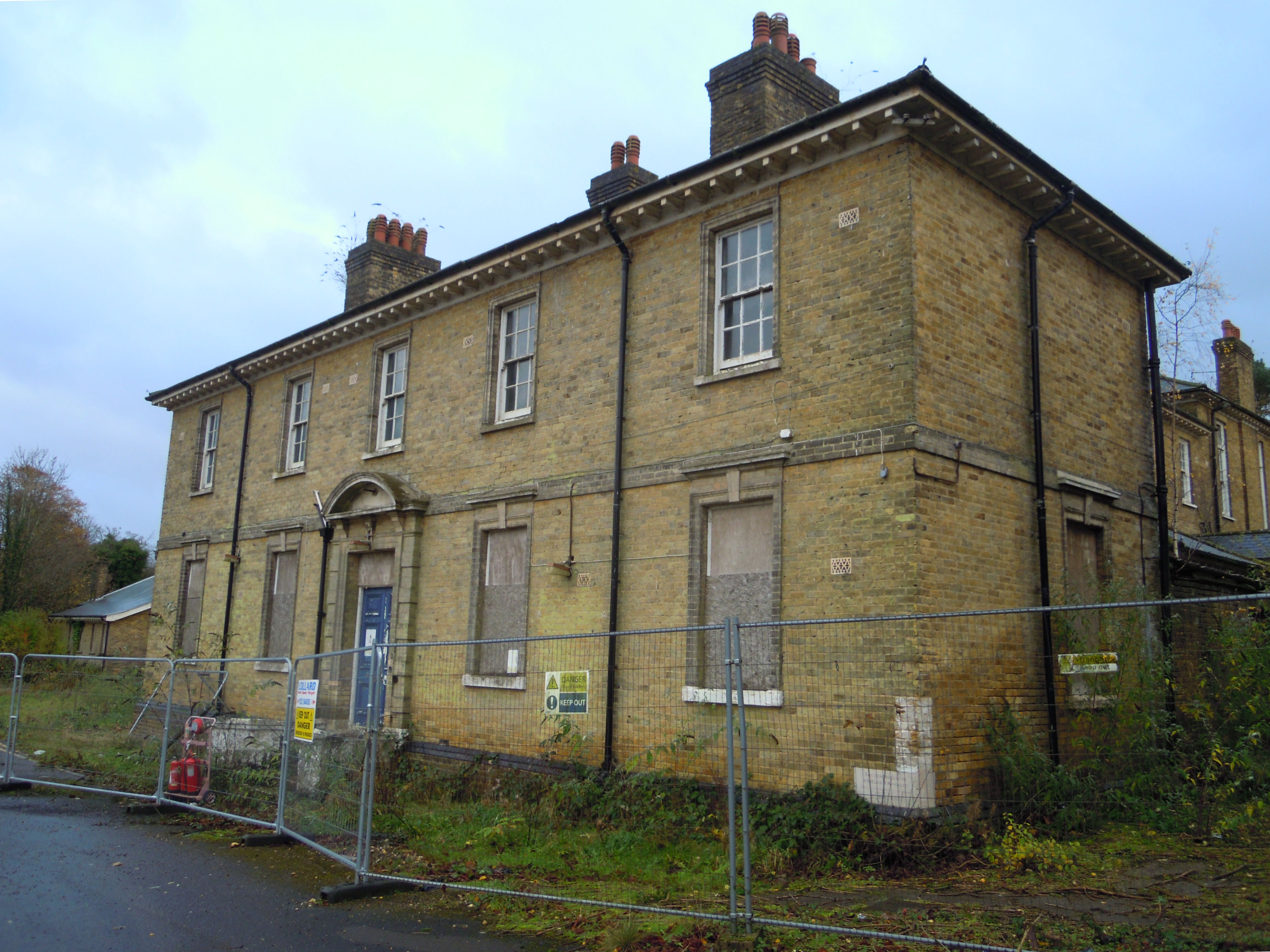
The derelict Louise Margaret Hospital in 2016

In the 1980s administrators made the Louise Margaret an "annexe" to the Cambridge Hospital next door. The last baby was born there in 1995, shortly before the hospital closed for ever on the 18 January. It was soon sold to the local authority, Rushmoor Council, who are treating it as a historic building of local importance, given extra weight by its relationship to nearby buildings, especially the Cambridge Hospital. They have carried out detailed conservation and heritage surveys with a view to redeveloping not only the hospital but adjacent sites too. Council planning documents support the idea of removing all post-1926 additions and turning the Louise Margaret Hospital into housing.

== Notable births ==
- Tom Hunter VC
