= Castle of Zahara de la Sierra =

- Castillo de Zahara de la Sierra (Spanish)
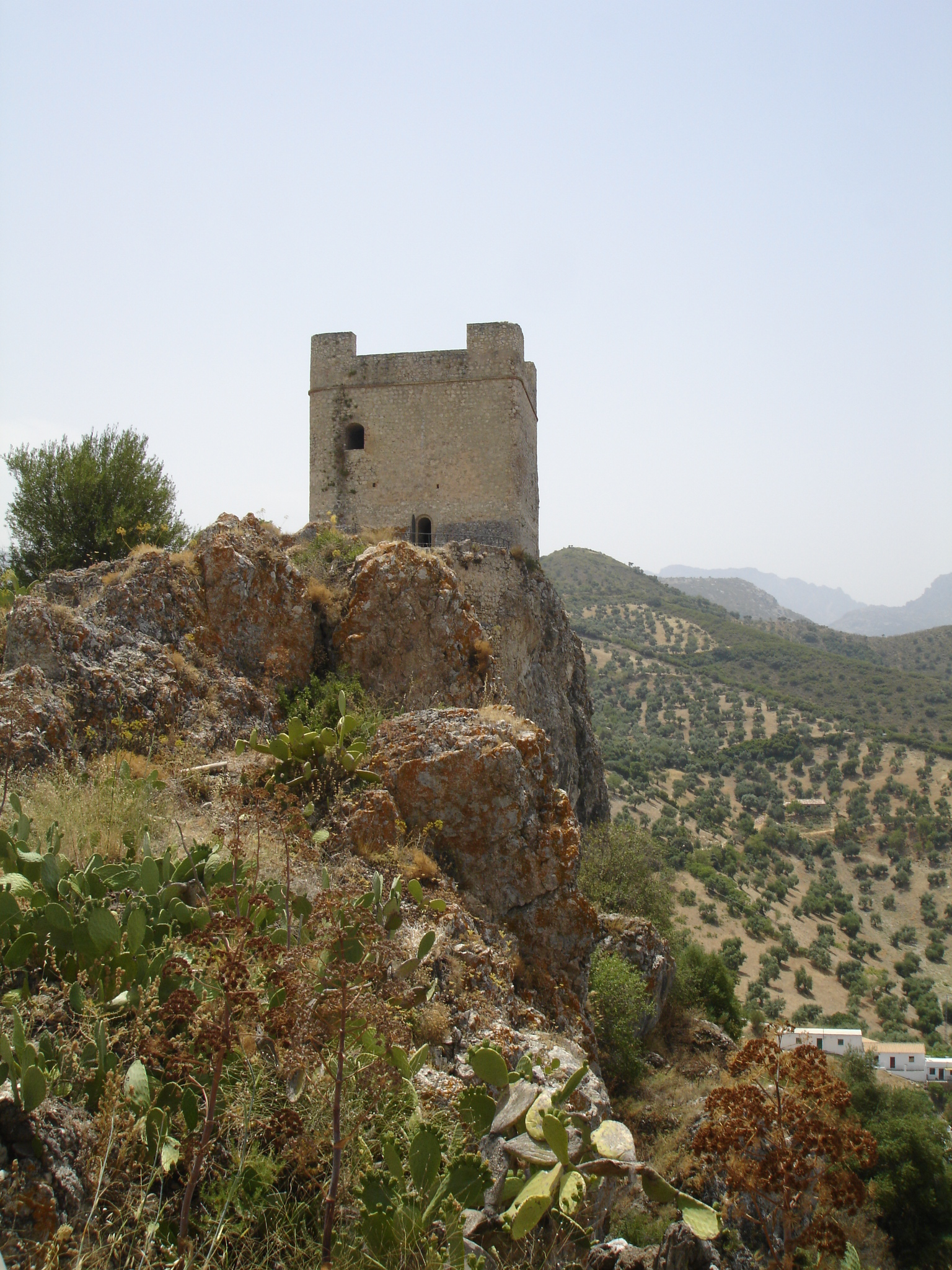

- Location within Spain
- 36.838486°N 5.390269°W
- Location: Zahara de la Sierra, Spain

Spanish Cultural Heritage
- Official name: Castillo de Zahara de la Sierra
- Type: Non-movable
- Criteria: Monument
- Designated: 1993
- Reference no.: RI-51-0007649

The Castle of Zahara de la Sierra (Spanish: Castillo de Zahara de la Sierra) is a castle located in Zahara de la Sierra, Spain. It was declared Bien de Interés Cultural in 1993.
