= Battle of Bornos (1811) =

1811 battle during the Peninsular War

- Part of Peninsular War
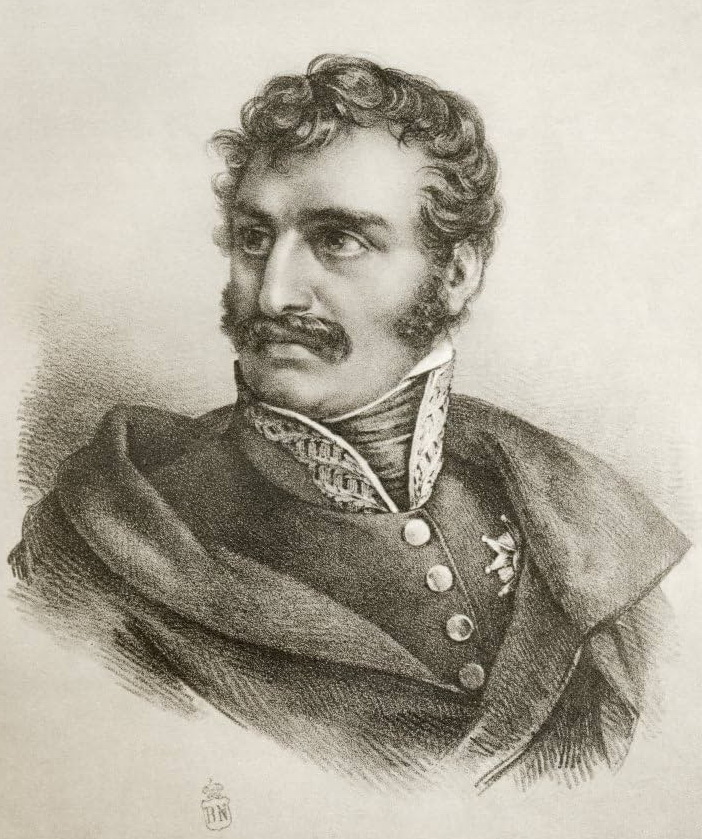
- Francisco Ballesteros outwitted the French in fall 1811.
Date	5 November 1811
Location	Bornos, Spain 36°49′N 5°44′W
Result	Spanish victory

Belligerents
French Empire	Kingdom of Spain

Commanders and leaders
(First French Empire) Jean Pierre Semellé	(Spain) Francisco Ballesteros

Strength
2,300	Unknown

Casualties and losses
900	Unknown

Peninsular War: Siege of Cádiz
current battle

The Battle of Bornos on 5 November 1811 saw a Spanish force led by Francisco Ballesteros attack an Imperial French column under Jean-Baptiste Pierre de Semellé. The action was part of a larger operation in which the French tried to trap Ballesteros but failed. Instead, the Spanish general lashed out at one of the French columns. The French escaped disaster when they fought their way out, but a French-allied Spanish battalion either surrendered or switched sides. Bornos is about 40 miles (64 km) northeast of Jerez de la Frontera on Route 342. The battle occurred during the Peninsular War, part of the Napoleonic Wars.

== Background ==
In the fall of 1811, the British navy transported Francisco Ballesteros and a small army to Algeciras. The Spanish force marched inland on another one of many forays. The French commander in Andalusia, Marshal Nicolas Soult was irritated by the continual raiding of his territory by Ballesteros and he determined to catch the clever Spanish general.

== Battle ==
To trap Ballesteros, Soult organized three columns under General of Division Nicolas Godinot, General of Division Pierre Barrois, and General of Brigade Jean-Baptiste Pierre de Semellé.< In July 1811, Godinot commanded the 2nd Division of the I Corps, with a strength of 8,133 men in 13 battalions. Godinot set out from Seville while Barrois and Semellé left the Siege of Cádiz lines. Ballesteros detected the converging French forces and raced south to Gibraltar where he found refuge. On 14 October, 10,000 French troops arrived in front of Gibraltar. Lacking the supplies for a siege, the French retreated the next day.<

Godinot tried to march on Tarifa but his troops were bombarded by British warships as they marched on the coast road. Giving up the attempt, he withdrew to Seville. Blamed for the operation's failure, Godinot later committed suicide. On 5 November, Ballesteros marched to Bornos where he surprised Semellé, who commanded 1,500 men of the 16th Light Infantry and a French-allied Juramentados battalion. Semellé and the 16th Light cut their way out of the trap, but the Juramentados either surrendered< or defected en masse during the fighting. The 16th Light suffered 100 casualties in the combat. Since Semellé commanded 2,300 men, including 1,500 French, presumably the lost Juramentados battalion counted 800 men. Ballesteros led a force consisting of both regular and irregular elements. Spanish strengths and casualties in the action were not given.

== Second Bornos ==
A second Battle of Bornos occurred on 31 May 1812 when Ballesteros surprised Nicolas François Conroux's troops in the town. The outnumbered French fought back effectively and drove off the Spanish troops with serious losses.
