= Nicolas François Conroux =

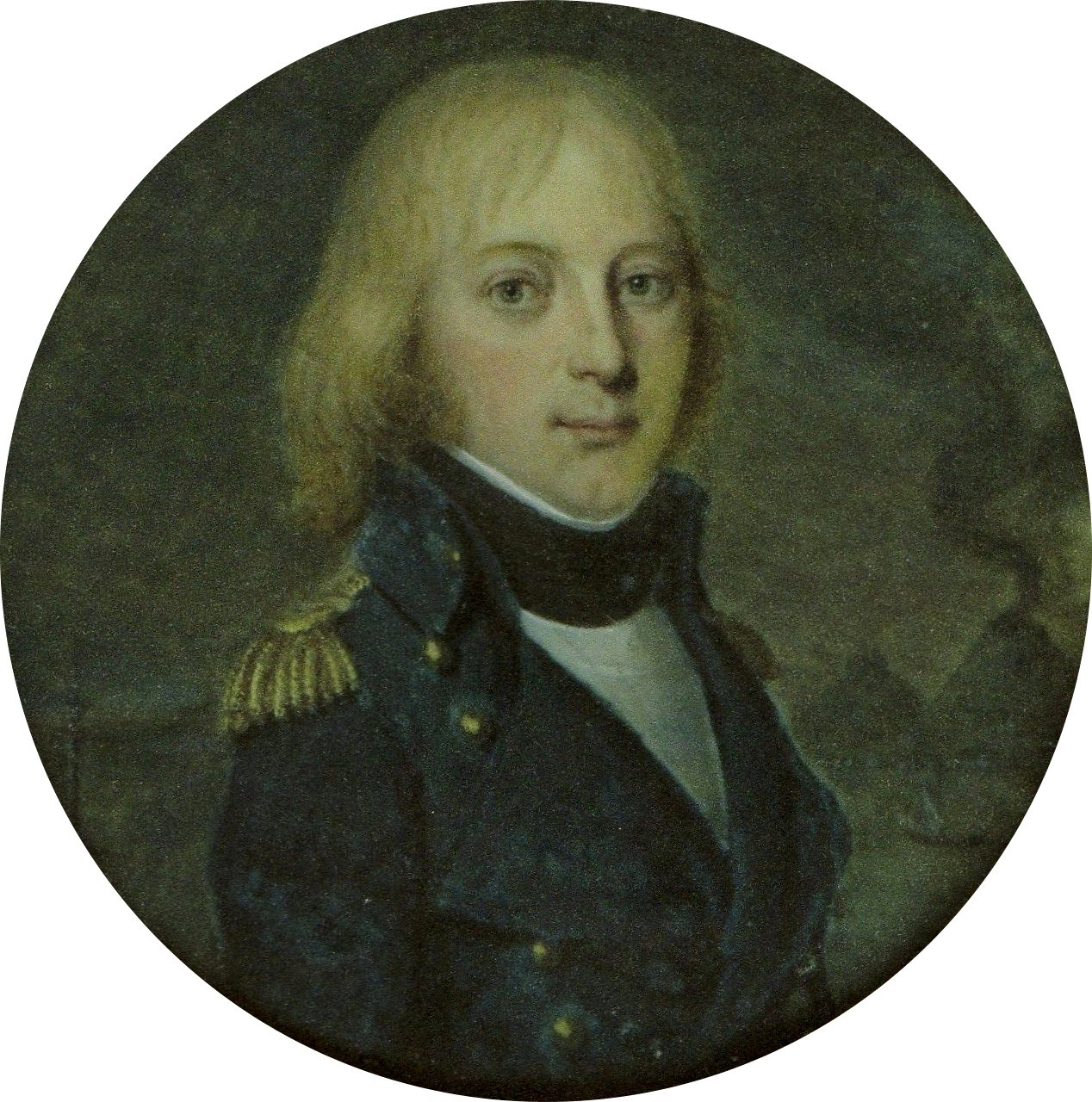
- Nicolas François Conroux painted at Naples by Jean-Baptiste Wicar.
- Born: 17 February 1770; Douai, France
- Died: 11 November 1813 (aged 43) Bayonne, France
- Allegiance: France
- Branch: Artillery, Infantry
- Service years: 1786–1813
- Rank: General of Division
- Conflicts: French Revolutionary Wars; Battle of Arlon (1793); Battle of Arlon (1794); Battle of Fleurus; Rhine campaign of 1796; Battle of Valvasone; Conquest of Naples; Battle of Cassano; Napoleonic Wars; Battle of Austerlitz; Battle of Heilsberg; Battle of Friedland; Battle of Aspern-Essling; Battle of Wagram; Battle of Fuentes de Onoro; Battle of Bornos; Battle of Vitoria; Battle of the Pyrenees; Battle of San Marcial; Battle of the Bidassoa; Battle of Nivelle
- Awards: Légion d'Honneur, CC 1807
- Other work: Baron of the Empire, 1808

Nicolas François Conroux, Baron de Pépinville (French pronunciation: [nikɔlɑ fʁɑ̃swa kɔ̃ʁu baʁɔ̃ də pepɛ̃vil]; 17 February 1770 – 11 November 1813) became a division commander during the Napoleonic Wars and was killed fighting the British in southern France. In 1786 he joined the French Royal Army and by 1792 he was an officer in an infantry regiment. During the French Revolutionary Wars he fought at First Arlon, Second Arlon, Fleurus, the 1796 campaign in southern Germany, Valvasone, and the 1798 invasion of Naples. In 1802 he was given command of an infantry regiment.

After leading his troops at Austerlitz in 1805, he was promoted to general officer. He led a brigade at Heilsberg, Friedland, Aspern-Essling, and Wagram. After being promoted again, he commanded a division in Spain at Fuentes de Onoro, Bornos, Vitoria, the Pyrenees, San Marcial, and the Bidassoa. He was fatally wounded at the Battle of Nivelle and died the following day. His surname is one of the Names inscribed under the Arc de Triomphe, on Column 16.
