= Montemolín =

- Coat of arms

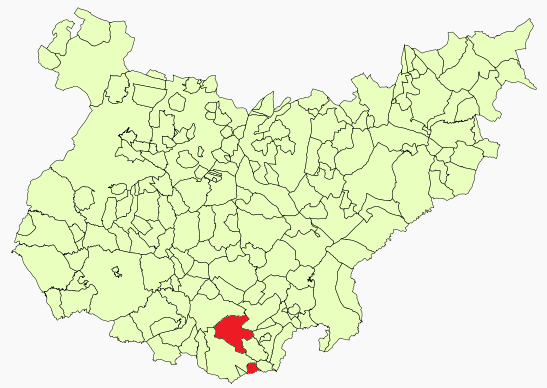
- Location in Badajoz

- Location of Montemolín within Extremadura
- Coordinates: 38°9′15″N 6°12′44″W
- Country: Spain
- Autonomous community: Extremadura
- Province: Badajoz
- Municipality: Montemolín

Area
  - Total: 202.7 km^{2} (78.3 sq mi)
- Elevation: 615 m (2,018 ft)

Population (2025-01-01)
  - Total: 1,231
  - Density: 6.073/km^{2} (15.73/sq mi)
- Time zone: UTC+1 (CET)
  - Summer (DST): UTC+2 (CEST)

Montemolín is a municipality located in the province of Badajoz, Extremadura, Spain. According to the 2005 census (INE), the municipality has a population of 1582 inhabitants.

== See also ==
- List of municipalities in Badajoz
