= Juan Bautista Muñoz =

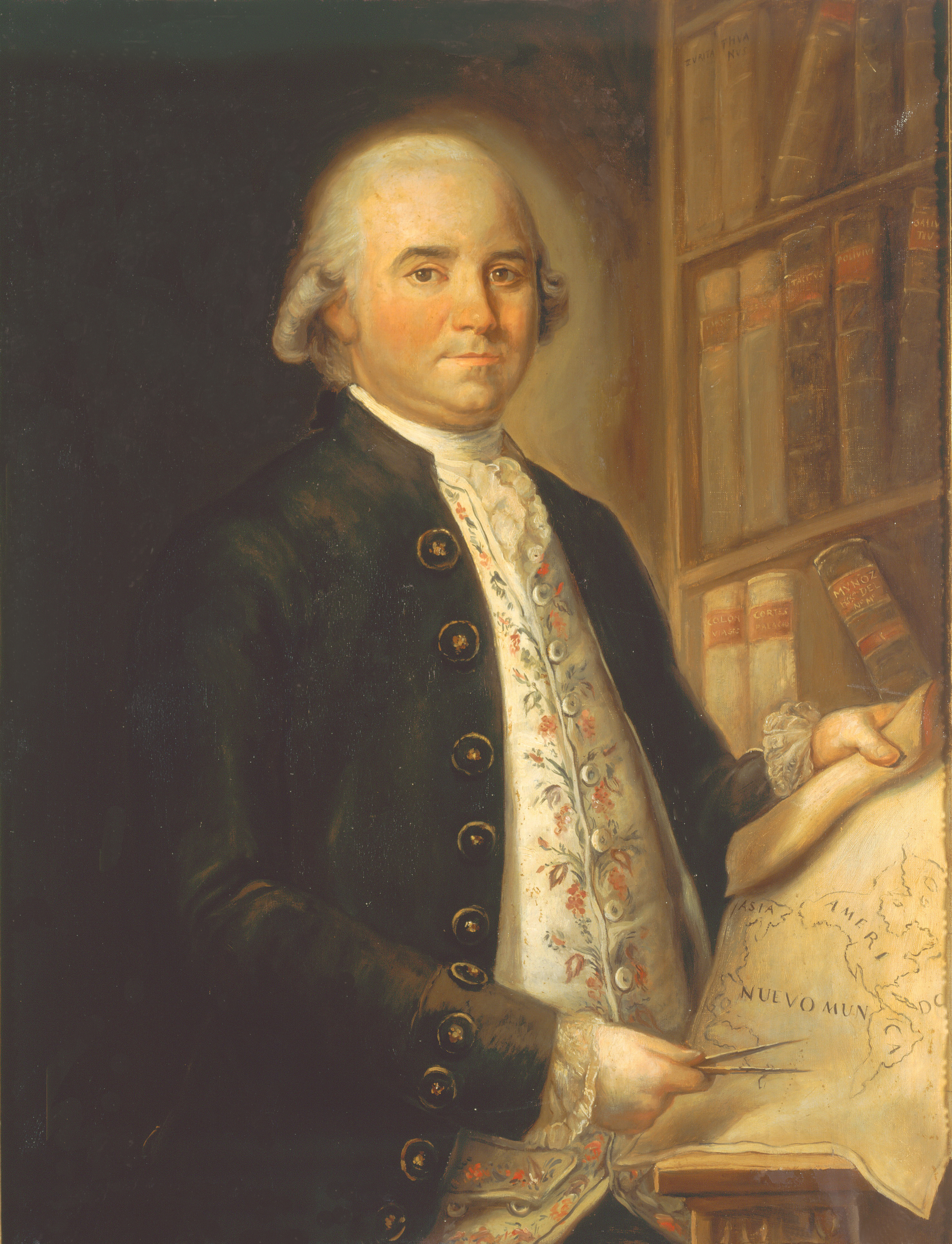
Juan Bautista Muñoz, attributed to Mariano Salvador Maella (Museum of Romanticism, Madrid)

Juan Bautista Muñoz (Museros, 12 June 1745 – Madrid, 19 July 1799) was an 18th-century Spanish philosopher and historian. He wrote a major history of Spain and Spanish America, using Spanish archival resources, and was the driving force behind the creation of the Archive of the Indies. That brought into a single repository all the documents pertaining to the administration of Spanish overseas possessions.

== Biography ==
Born in Museros (near Valencia) in 1745, Juan Bautista Muñoz was the third of four sons. After the death of his father in 1751, his mother placed him under the tutelage of his uncle, the Dominican friar Gabriel Ferrandis at the convent of Pilar de Valencia, where he began to receive his first formal education. From 1753 to 1757, Muñoz was enrolled at the Jesuit seminary in Valencia, where he came under the influence of the polymath Antonio Eximeno Pujades, and began to take an interest in mathematics and modern philosophy.

=== Academic at Valencia ===
From 1757 to 1770, Juan Bautista Muñoz was at the University of Valencia, initially as a student, then as a teacher. He received his master of arts and bachelor in philosophy in 1760, and a doctorate in theology by 1765. Imbibing the spirit of the Age of Enlightenment, Muñoz made a name for himself at the university as an opponent of Scholasticism and a reformer of the curriculum towards more modern topics. In his eclectic philosophical treatise, De recto philosophiae recentis in theologiae usu dissertatio (1767), Muñoz laid out the case for the usefulness of modern philosophy and natural theology to traditional theology. He promoted the introduction of the works of François Jacquier and Luis António Verney in the curriculum. During this period, Muñoz also undertook the labors of editing the works of Louis of Granada, which came out in several volumes between 1765 and 1775.

As a Dominican and a modernist, Muñoz's career profited from the royal edict of Charles III of 1767 expelling the Jesuits from Spain. After a brief sojourn in Rome in 1768, Muñoz was appointed to the chair of philosophy at Valencia in 1769.

=== Cosmographer-major ===
On October 28, 1770, at the age of twenty-five, Juan Bautista Muñoz was appointed Cosmografo mayor de Indias (cosmographer-major of the Indies) by King Charles III of Spain. He resigned his chair at Valencia and moved to Madrid to take up his office. The position, created in 1571, had become ill-defined by this time, the Spanish navy had already absconded with most of its scientific functions, and urged the abolition of the post. Muñoz tried to redefine the post, partitioning some of the functions with the naval academy. Despite his efforts, the post was formally abolished by royal edict in 1783, although Muñoz continued to use the title down to his death 1799.

It was in this capacity as cosmographer-major that Muñoz began to delve more deeply into history. In the course of the composition of the geographical and navigational reports and memoirs he submitted to the Consejo de Indias, Muñoz frequently had to resort to examining the historical documentary record of Spanish America. While in Madrid, he also participated in the educational reform movement launched by Charles III, putting out a treatise on the matter in 1778 (Juicio del tratado de educacion de Pozzi).

=== History of the New World ===
In the late 18th century, published Spanish histories of the Indies were in an out-of-date state. The first draft had been composed by Peter Martyr d'Anghiera in his Decadas (1511–25), which were supplemented shortly after by a small 1552 tract by Bartolomé de las Casas and the first part of the Historia general de las Indias (1535) of Gonzalo Fernández de Oviedo y Valdés (the rest of Las Casas and Oviedo would only appear in the 19th century; the life of Columbus by his son Ferdinand Columbus, only existed in an Italian edition (1571) at the time). The first comprehensive Spanish history of the Indies had been Francisco López de Gómara's Hispania Victrix (1552). The last great history had been Antonio Herrera's Historia general (1601–15). Although partial histories had been written since, Herrera's treatise, nearly two-centuries old, remained effectively the last general work on the matter until Muñoz's time.

Foreign writers had weighed in with their own accounts. The most recent and significant had been the History of America by the Scottish historian William Robertson, which appeared in 1777. Robertson's history, in the modern Enlightenment tradition and historical methodology, was initially well received and a Spanish translation augmented with Spanish archival materials completed. But a Spanish reviewer took issue with Robertson's work, and the translation never published. The outbreak of the Anglo-Spanish War (1779) had suspended the further appearance of Robertson's work in Spain, and encouraged the Spanish establishment to initiate its own up-dated history.

On July 17, 1779, Charles III formally placed Muñoz with the responsibility of writing a comprehensive history of the Spanish conquest and colonization of the Americas, in an effort to set the record straight, snuff out various apocryphal stories and leyenda negra rumors circulating throughout Europe and defend Spanish territorial rights in America from the encroaching claims of other European powers. Muñoz set about collecting and examining documentary material scattered in various archives throughout Spain and Portugal, with the objective of turning his history into an objective reference work.

In 1784, Muñoz moved to Seville, where he had available the archives of the House of Trade and the Columbian Library at the cathedral of Seville (the depository library collected by Ferdinand Columbus in the early 16th century, and deposited at the cathedral after his death in 1539).

Seeing the value of having all the Indies-related documents collected in one place, Muñoz recommended to José de Gálvez, the Minister of State, that a repository bringing together all the documentary materials for the Indies. The monarch approved the project, ordering the establishment of the Archive of the Indies at Casa Lonja in Seville. The 16th c. building was the former quarters of the merchant guild, when the monopoly port was Seville. The king issued orders to other archives to deliver Indies-related documents. The project for the new archive was under the direction of José de Gálvez, who worked closely with Muñoz in collecting, sifting and cataloging the incoming documents. The archives of the Council of the Indies, the royal archives of Simancas, the House of Trade's archives in Seville and Cadiz and the archives of the Secretaria de Estado y del Despacho de Indias were the principal feeders of the new Archive of the Indies. Before that, materials pertaining to Spain's overseas possessions had not been separated.

The first volume of Juan Bautista Muñoz's Historia del Nuevo Mundo appeared in 1793.

== Works ==
- De recto philosophiae recentis in theologiae usu dissertatio (1767),
- Juicio del tratado de educacion de Pozzi (1778)

Unpublished memoirs to the Consejo de Indias:

- Sobre la Navegación del Mar del Sur (1779)
- Sobre la empresa real de unir el océano Atlántico con el Pacífico por el Istmo de Panamá (1786)
- Sobre la conquista y descubrimiento del Darién, 1774 (undated)
- Dictamen de Muñoz sobre la Descripción del Peru del doctor don Cosme Bueno, dirigido a Miguel de San Martín Cueto (1786)
- Dictamen sobre la pretención de los angloamericanos a la navegación del Missisipi (1788)

Published works:

- Historia del Nuevo-Mundo, 1793, Madrid: Ibarra. v.1 (1797 English translation, The History of the New World, London: G.G. & J. Robinson, v.1 of 1)
