= The Birth of the Virgin (Murillo) =

Painting by Bartolomé Esteban Murillo

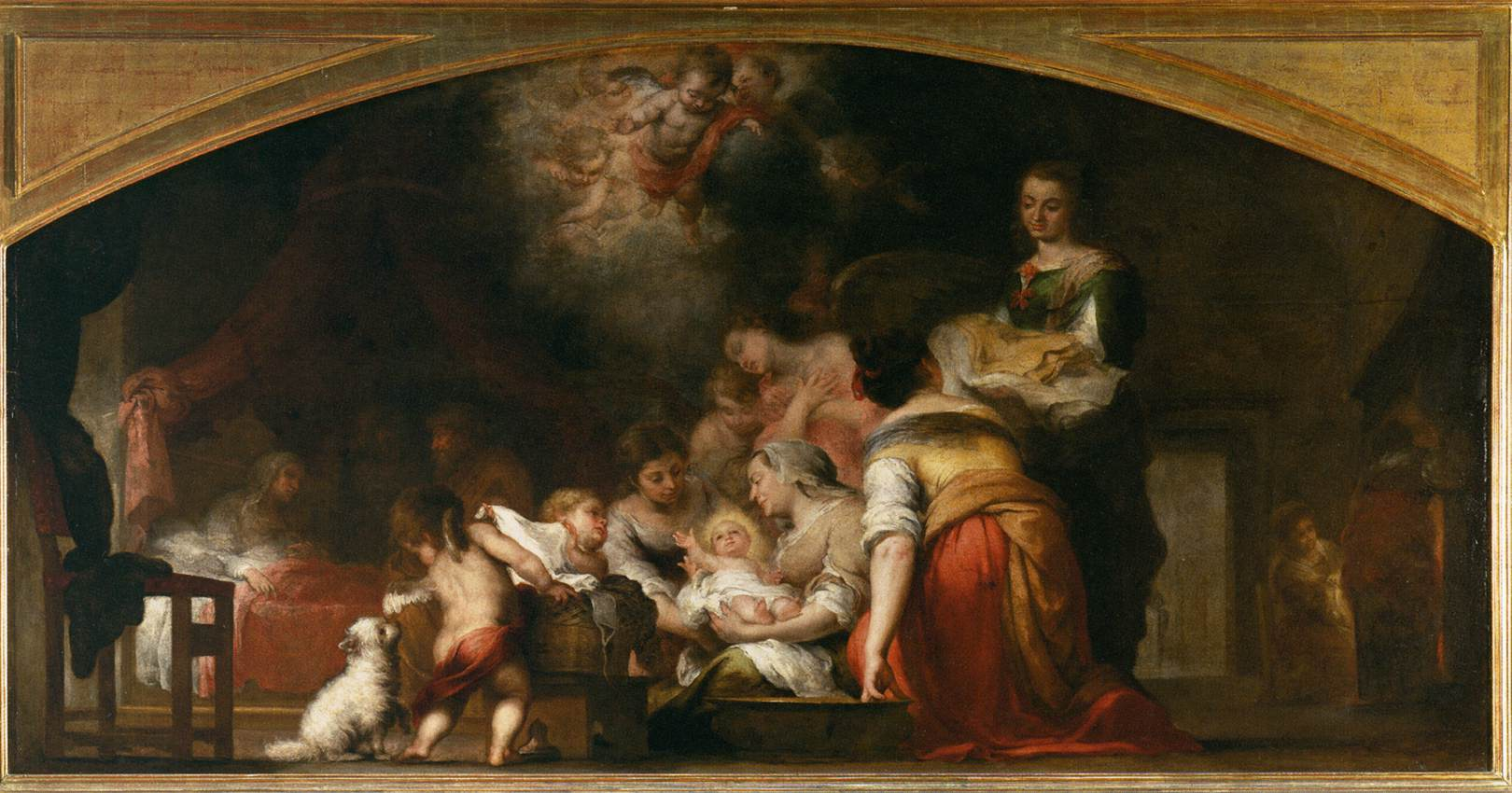
- Artist: Bartolomé Esteban Murillo
- Year: c. 1661
- Medium: Oil on canvas
- Dimensions: 179 cm × 349 cm (70 in × 137 in)
- Location: Louvre, Paris

The Birth of the Virgin is a 1661 painting by the Spanish artist Bartolomé Esteban Murillo.

== History ==
He painted it for the Chapel of the Immaculate Conception in Seville Cathedral, from which it and the same artist's Immaculate Conception were looted by French troops under Marshal Jean de Dieu Soult. The French had hoped to confiscate The Vision of Saint Anthony of Padua, but the city council proposed to exchange that work for Birth and it was thus removed from the chapel. It is now in the Louvre in Paris.

== Analysis ==
This is one of the most important works in the artistic production of Murillo, who based himself on models of daily life in Andalusia to create the painting. Apart from the presence of angels and the halo of the Virgin, there is no other clue showing that this is a painting with a religious theme.

The figure of the Virgin Mary is at the center of the composition, supported in the arms of various women. At the same time, a source of light emanates which illuminates the whole scene, although Saint Anne remains in the shadows, incorporated in the bed. Saint Joachim is also depicted in the painting.

The play of light that Murillo employs recalls the works of Rembrandt, which the painter may have admired in private collections.

== Sources ==
- Nina A. Mallory El Greco to Murillo: Spanish Painting in the Golden Age, 1556–1700, Harper & Row, 1990. ISBN 9780064355315
- Albert Frederick Calvert, Murillo C. Scribner's sons, 1908. OCLC 66738190
