= The Vision of Saint Anthony of Padua =

The Vision of Saint Anthony of Padua is the name of the following paintings:

- The Vision of Saint Anthony of Padua (Murillo), a 1656 oil-on-canvas painting by Bartolomé Esteban Murillo
- The Vision of Saint Anthony of Padua (Pittoni), a 1730 oil-on-canvas painting by Giambattista Pittoni
