= Lorenzo Mercadante =

French sculptor

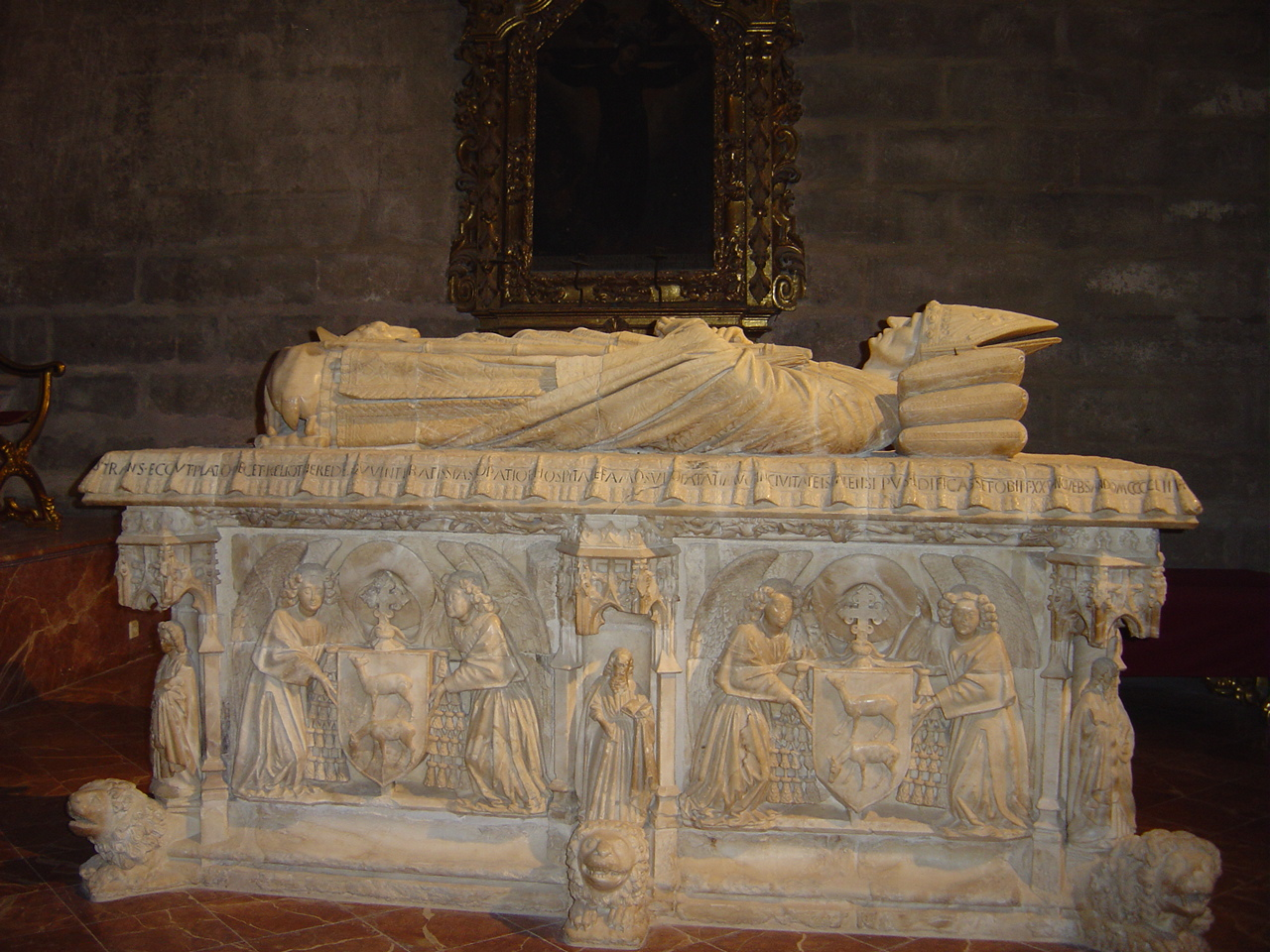
Sepulchre of Cardinal Juan de Cervantes, in the Cathedral of Seville, realized by Mercadante in 1458.

Lorenzo Mercadante or Lorenzo Mercadante de Bretaña was a Breton sculptor active in the second half of the 15th century. Between 1454 and 1467 he worked in the Cathedral of Seville, where he executed the sepulchre of Cardinal Juan de Cervantes (1458) and the decoration of the portals of Christ's Birth and Baptism (Nacimiento and Bautismo, 1464–67). He used fired clay, or terracotta, and alabaster to achieved naturalism. His style influenced Sevillian sculpture in the last part of the Late Gothic era, and represented the transition to the Renaissance. Other outstanding works of his, all in Spain, are a Saint Michael now in the Museu Nacional d'Art de Catalunya in Barcelona, another Saint Michael discovered in 1999 in Sanlúcar la Mayor, and a Virgin and Child, originally in Fregenal de la Sierra, now in the Museo de Bellas Artes de Sevilla.
