= Church of San Salvador (Seville) =

Church building in Seville, Spain

Coordinates: 37°23′24″N 5°59′33″W

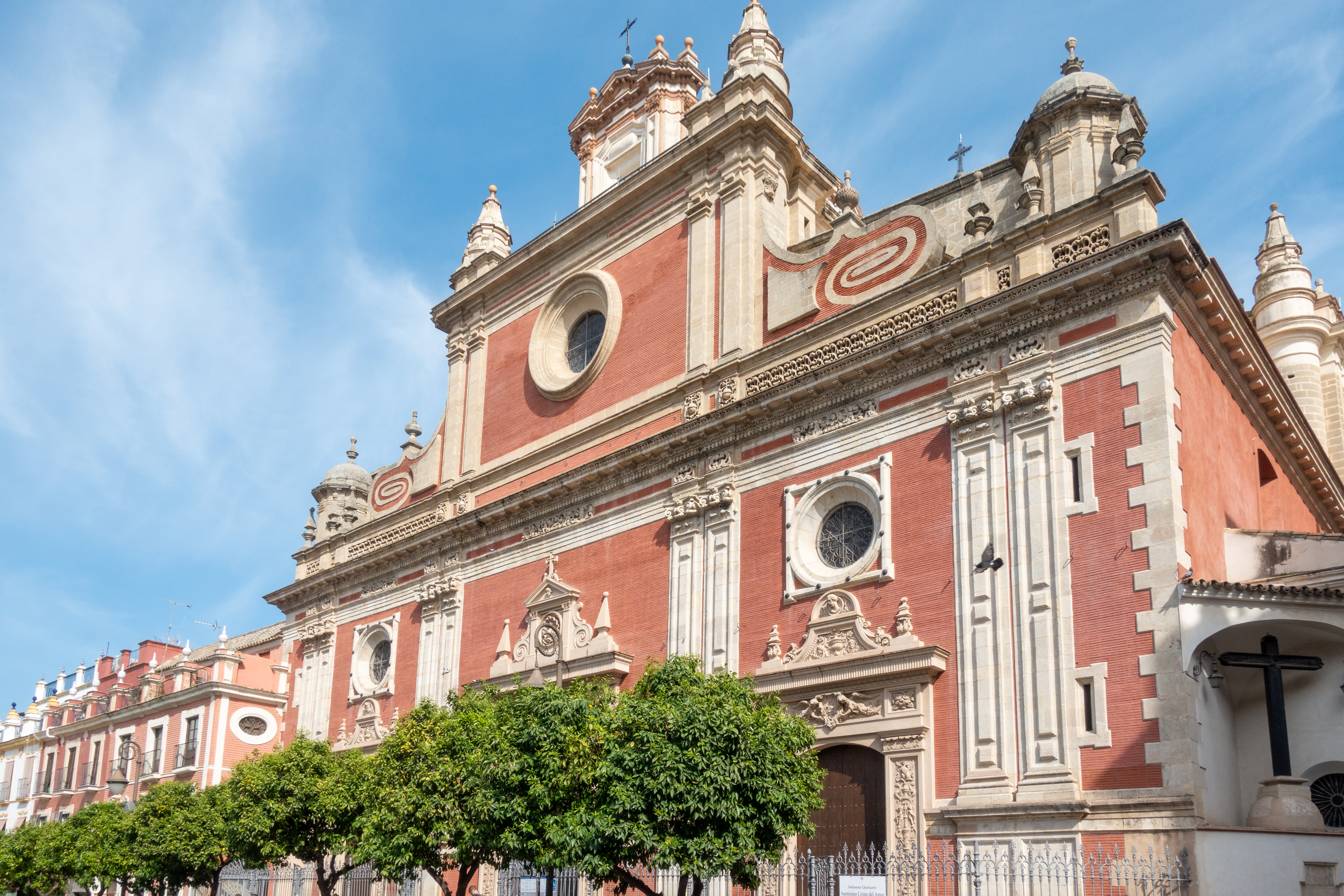
Exterior of the church, seen from Plaza del Salvador

The Church of San Salvador is a church in Seville, Spain. It is the second-largest church in Seville, after the city's cathedral.

== History ==
The Ibn Adabbas Mosque was built in 830 to serve as the main congregational mosque of Seville, during the period of Umayyad rule in al-Andalus. It is believed to have been the second-oldest mosque in al-Andalus, after the Great Mosque of Cordoba (founded in 785). This mosque had a hypostyle form consisting of eleven aisles divided by rows of brick arches supported on marble columns.

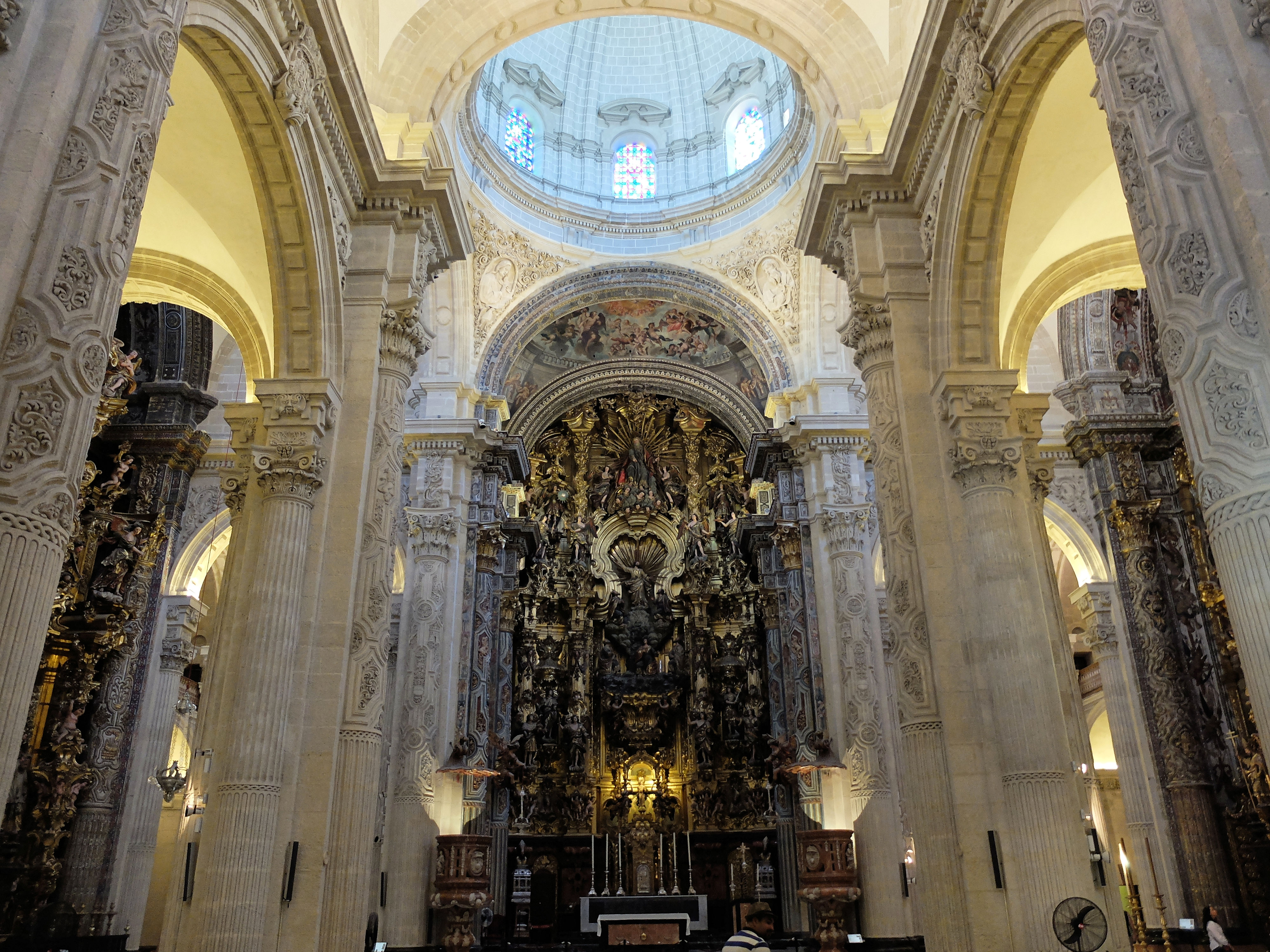
Interior of the church

After the conquest of Seville by Castile in 1248, the mosque was converted into a church and named San Salvador ('Holy Savior'). The building did not undergo any major changes until 1669, when archbishop Payno Osorio visited it. He found it in dangerously neglected condition and decided to condemn the building and order its demolition. Construction on a new church began in 1674 and was finished in 1712, resulting in the lofty Baroque edifice overlooking Plaza del Salvador today.
