= Consulado de mercaderes =

Spanish merchant guild responsible for shipping to America

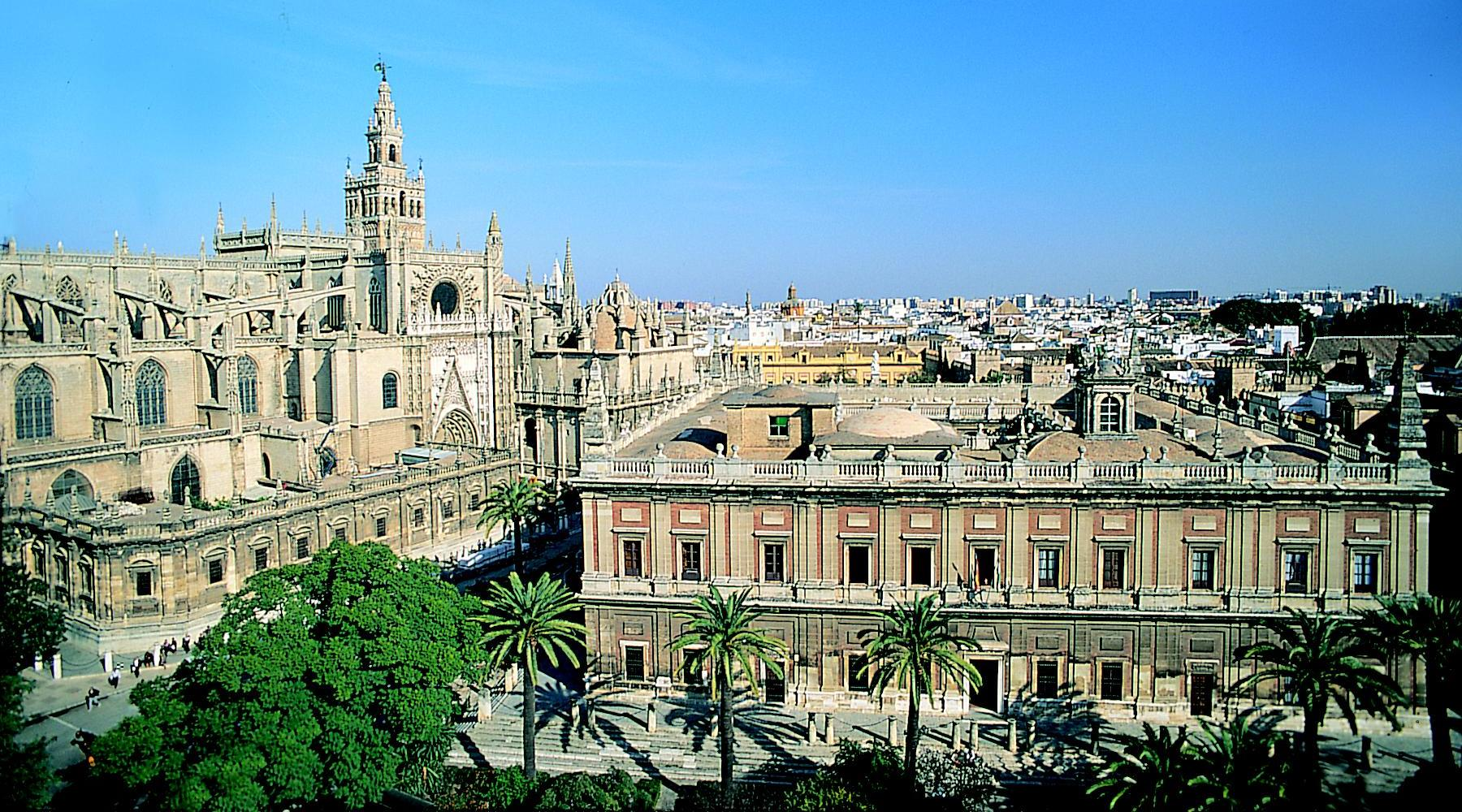
The former Casa Lonja (right), built for it by Philip II and today the Archivo General de Indias, next to the Cathedral of Seville

The Consulado de mercaderes was the Spanish merchant guild, founded in Seville, the sole port for Spain's overseas trade in the 16th and 17th centuries, until the official port was relocated to Cádiz, following the Treaty of Utrecht. In theory, the Consulado enjoyed virtual monopoly rights over goods shipped to America, in a regular and closely controlled Spanish treasure fleet, and handled much of the silver this trade generated.

A consulado was founded in Mexico City in 1594, controlled by peninsular wholesale merchants who dealt in long-distance trade and often married into local elite families with commercial ties. Their assets had to amount to at least 28,000 pesos. Although they were not supposed to deal in local retail trade, they often did some indirectly. They mainly lived in Mexico City and had positions on the city council or cabildo. A number of them were connected to the crown mint in the capital. They diversified the assets locally, investing in urban real estate. In the 18th century, as New Spain's economy boomed, consulados were established in the port of Veracruz and in Guadalajara, indicating increased trade and the expansion of the merchant elite. The consulado in late colonial Mexico had approximately 200 members, who divided themselves into two factions, the Basque and Montañés, even though some were from neither of these Iberian regions. American-born merchants came to be part of the consulado in the later colonial period, but a small number of peninsular merchants dominated. Goods were shipped from the Spanish port of Cádiz to Veracruz, but many of the goods were produced elsewhere in Europe.

== Importance of the Consulado ==
In the mid-16th century, all American trade from Spain was mandated to go through the city of Seville, and later, the nearby port of Cádiz. The Casa de Contratación, ("House of Trade"), registered ships and passengers bound for Spain's overseas territories, kept sea charts, collected taxes, and in general controlled the Indies trade. In order to survive and maintain an effective business, the Casa de Contratación worked in conjunction with the merchant guild (Consulado), which in turn controlled goods shipped to America and was paid vast amounts of silver in return for its cooperation.

== Effects of the Consulado's control ==
Since it controlled most of the trade in the Spanish colonies, and since the Consulado was linked to the branches in Mexico City and Lima (and in the 18th century, other ports as well), it was able to maintain its monopoly of Spanish trade and keep prices high in all the colonies, and even played a hand in royal politics. The Consulado effectively manipulated the government and the citizenry of both Spain and the Indies colonies, and grew richer and more powerful every day because of it.

== Statistics ==
- In 1520, twenty-three years before the Merchant Guild was founded in 1543, the total silver export of Spanish America was valued at around 500,000 pesos, with the royal family getting 400,000 pesos of the silver profit.
- In 1550, the total silver export was valued at around 1,000,000 pesos, with the royal family receiving 500,000 pesos of profit, while the rest went to the Consulado and the Casa de Contratación.
- In 1596, the peak year of silver production in Spanish America, the total silver export was valued at around 7,000,000 pesos, of which the royal family gained only 1,550,000, the rest going to the Casa de Contratación and the Consulado.

== See also ==
- Casa de Contratación
- Spanish Empire
- Spanish treasure fleet
