= Juan de Cervantes =

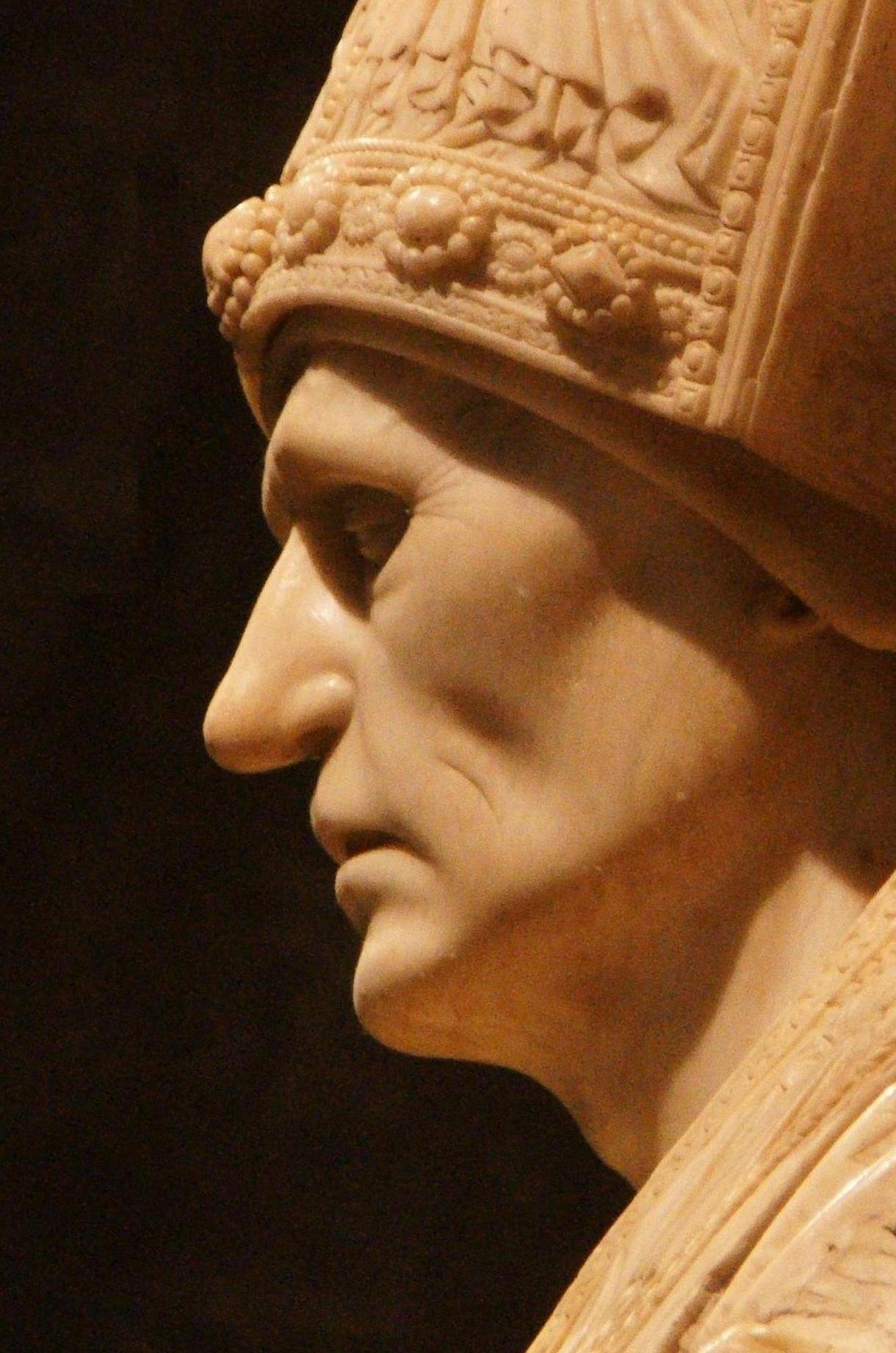
Juan de Cervantes, portrait from his tomb in the Cathedral of Sevilla

Juan de Cervantes (c. 1380 or 1382 in Seville, Spain – 25 November 1453, buried in Seville Cathedral) was a Cardinal of the Catholic Church.

Cervantes studied at the University of Salamanca and obtained a doctorate in civil and canon law and a magister in theology. He was made Archdeacon of Calatrava by Antipope Benedict XIII on 29 January 1415, Archdeacon of Sevilla in 1419, Papal referandary, Canon of Burgos and Abbot of Salas in Burgos in 1420. At the Council of Siena (1423–1424), he defended the Pope. He was chosen as a Cardinal by Pope Martin V in May 1426.

During the reign of Pope Eugene IV, Cervantes was active at the Council of Basel, eventually backing the Pope against the majority of the council's fathers.

He is buried in the Sepulcher of Cardinal Juan de Cervantes in the Seville Cathedral. His tomb was sculpted by Lorenzo Mercadante, which was finished around 1458.

Catholic Church titles
Preceded by Antonio Correr (cardinal)	Cardinal-Priest of San Pietro in Vincoli; 1426–1446	Succeeded by Nicholas of Cusa
Preceded by Gómez Manrique	Administrator of Tui; 1430–1438	Succeeded by García Martínez de Baamonde
Preceded by	Administrator of Ávila; 1437–1441	Succeeded by Lope Barrientos
Preceded by Lope Barrientos	Administrator of Segovia; 1441–1453	Succeeded by Luis de Acuña Osorio
Preceded by Gonzalo Mena Roelas	Administrator of Seville; 1449–1453	Succeeded by Alonso de Fonseca y Ulloa
Preceded by Antonio Correr	Cardinal-Bishop of Ostia e Velletri; 1446–1453	Succeeded by Giorgio Fieschi
