= General Archive of the Indies =

Historical documentary archive in Seville, Spain

Archive of the Indies
- Archivo General de Indias (Spanish)
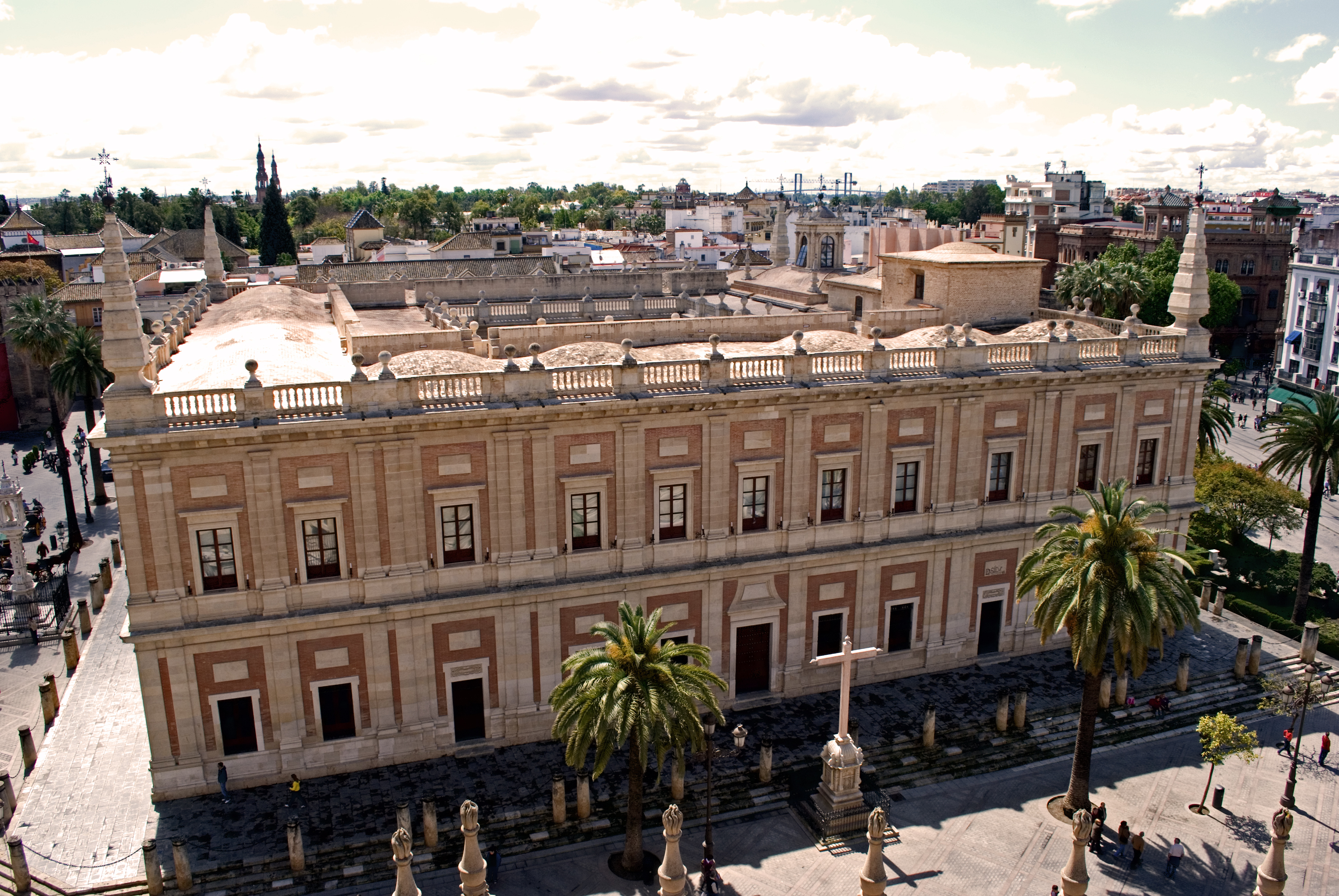
- The Archivo de Indias, Seville

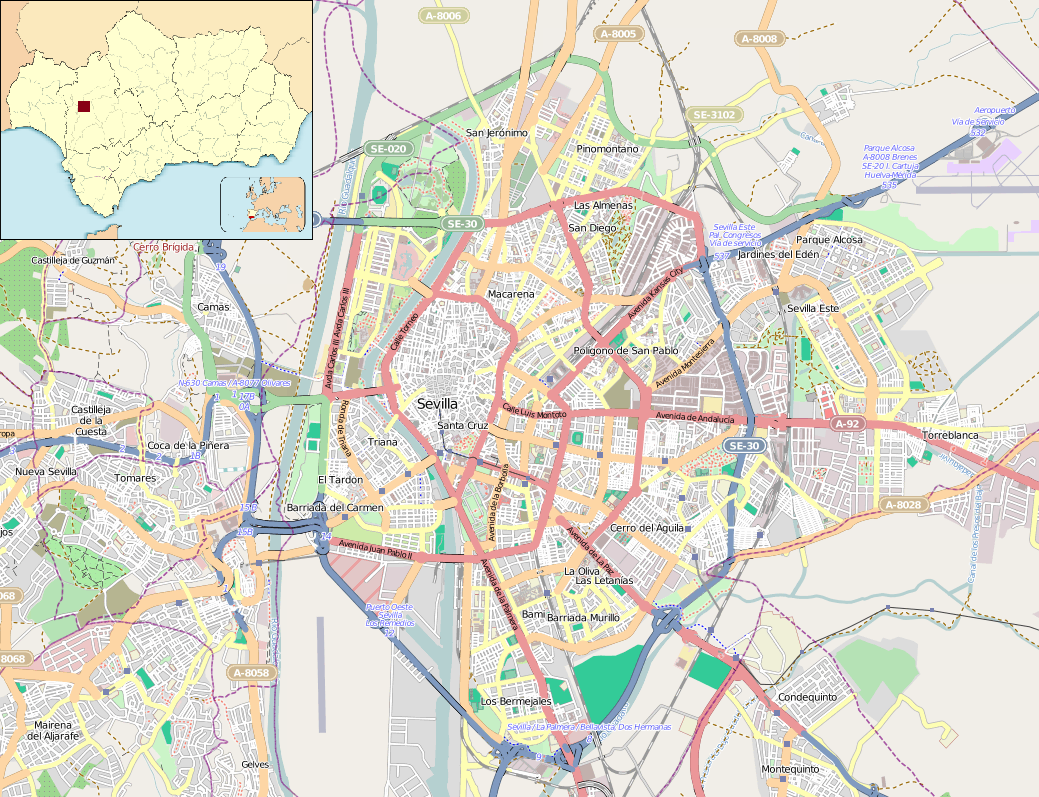
- Location in Seville
- 37°23′02″N 5°59′31″W
- Location: Seville, Andalusia, Spain

History
- Built: 16th century

Site notes
- Architect(s): Juan de Herrera; Juan de Mijares
- Architectural style: Renaissance

UNESCO World Heritage Site
- Official name: Cathedral, Alcázar and Archivo de Indias in Seville
- Type: Cultural
- Criteria: i, ii, iii, vi
- Designated: 1987 (118th session)
- Reference no.: 383
- Region: Europe

The Archivo General de Indias (Spanish pronunciation: [aɾˈtʃiβo xeneˈɾal de ˈindjas]; standard abbreviation AGI; lit. 'General Archive of the Indies'), often simply called the Archive of the Indies, was created by Charles III and inaugurated in 1785. It is housed in the former merchant guild building in Seville, Spain, built in the late 16th century. It became the repository of archival materials documenting the history of the Spanish Empire in the Americas and Asia. The building was designed by Juan de Herrera; it is an Italianate example of Spanish Renaissance architecture. This structure and its contents were registered in 1987 by UNESCO as a World Heritage Site, together with the adjoining Seville Cathedral and the Alcázar of Seville.

== Structure ==
The origin of the structure dates to 1572 when Philip II commissioned the building design from Juan de Herrera, the architect of the Escorial to house the Consulado de mercaderes of Seville. Until then, the merchants of Seville had been in the habit of retreating to the cool recesses of the cathedral to transact business.

The building, known as the Lonja, was begun in 1584 by Juan de Mijares, using Herrera's plans. The northern rooms of the ground floor were completed in 1598, as recorded by a dedicatory inscription over the central door of the northern façade, and the rest of the ground floor was completed the following year. Work then began on the next level but construction was paused in 1601 due to funding problems. Work resumed in 1609, but the building was not finished until 1646. Construction was directed by Miguel de Zumárraga from 1609 until his death in 1630, after which Pedro Sánchez Falconete continued and completed the work.

The building encloses a large central patio with ranges of two storeys, the windows set in slightly sunken panels between flat pilasters. Plain square tablets float in the space above each window. The building is surmounted by a balustrade, with rusticated obelisks standing at the corners. There is no sculptural decoration, only the discreetly contrasting tonalities of stone and stucco, and the light shadows cast by the slight relief of the pilasters against their piers, by the cornices, and by the cornice strips that cap each window.

In the aftermath of a devastating plague in 1649, the building appears to have been abandoned by merchants by 1660. From 1660 to 1674, one of its rooms was used as a painting academy established by Bartolomé Esteban Murillo. By the 18th century, the building's upper floor had been partitioned for use as apartments.

== Creation of the archive ==
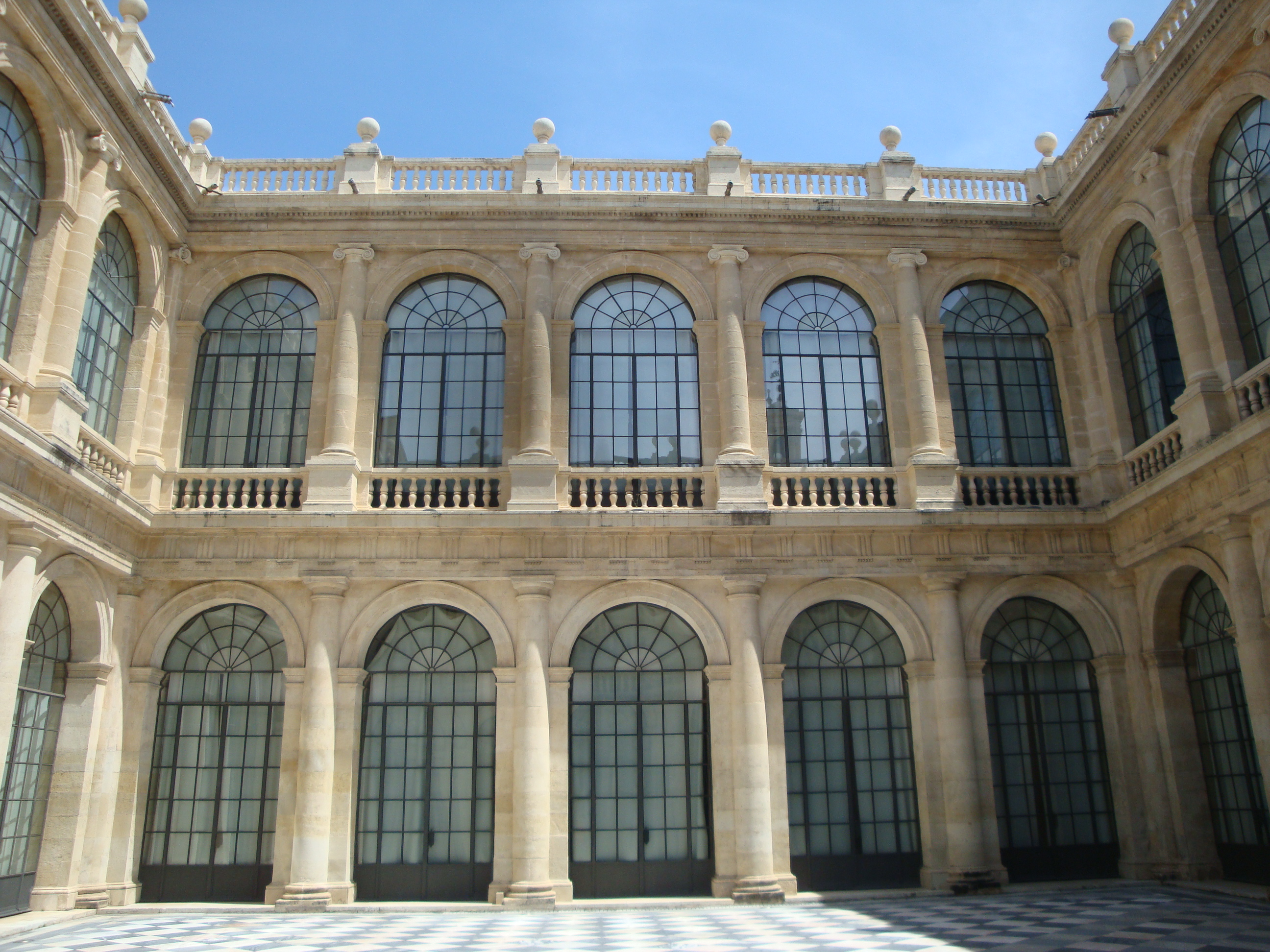
View of the main courtyard.

On 12 March 1784, Juan Bautista Muñoz, a historian who was attempting to write a history of the New World, wrote to José de Gálvez, the Minister of the Indies, suggesting the idea of creating a centralized archive for documents relating to the Americas. José de Gálvez had already been considering the idea for a decade and wrote back on 24 April, encouraging him to look in Seville and Cadiz for potential buildings that could house the archive. On 24 May, Muñoz toured the former Lonja with Féliz Carazas and Lucas Cintora. He wrote to Gálvez on 8 June, enthusiastic about selecting this structure since it was a solidly built made entirely of stone and contained sufficient space for a large number of documents. He indicated that they would merely need to remove the recent partitions of the upper floor and restore the building to its original state.

Gálvez communicated the idea to monarch Charles III, who on 27 June 1784 issued a letter instructing Muñoz to draft a proposal for the work needed to convert the building into the Archive of the Indies. In February 1785, Charles III approved a decree for the creation of the archives according the proposed plans. The project was to bring together under a single roof all the documentation regarding the overseas empire, which until that time had been held among various repositories, including in Simancas, Cádiz and Seville.

Responsibility for the project was delegated to José de Gálvez, Secretary for the Indies, who delegated historian Juan Bautista Muñoz for the plan's execution. Two basic motivations underlay the project. One was practical, the lack of space in the Archivo General de Simancas, the central repository of the Spanish Crown, There was also the expectation, in the spirit of the Enlightenment, that Spanish historians would take up the history of Spain's overseas empire. It was decided that, for the time being, documents evolved after 1760 would remain with their primary institutions. The first cartloads of the documents arrived in October 1785.

Some restructuring of the Casa Lonja to accommodate the materials was required, and a grand marble staircase was added in 1787 after the designs of Lucas Cintara.

== Archival holdings ==
The archives contain extensive autograph material dating from the time of the first Conquistadores to the end of the 19th century. Among these are Miguel de Cervantes' request for an official post, the Bull of Demarcation Inter caetera issued by Pope Alexander VI, the journal of Christopher Columbus, and maps and plans of Spanish American cities, in addition to the ordinary records that reveal the month-to-month workings of the vast bureaucratic machinery of the empire. These materials have been studied by historians over the last two centuries.

Today, the Archive of the Indies houses some nine kilometers of shelving, in 43,000 volumes and some 80 million pages, which were produced by the administrators in the Americas and the Philippines:

Fountain.

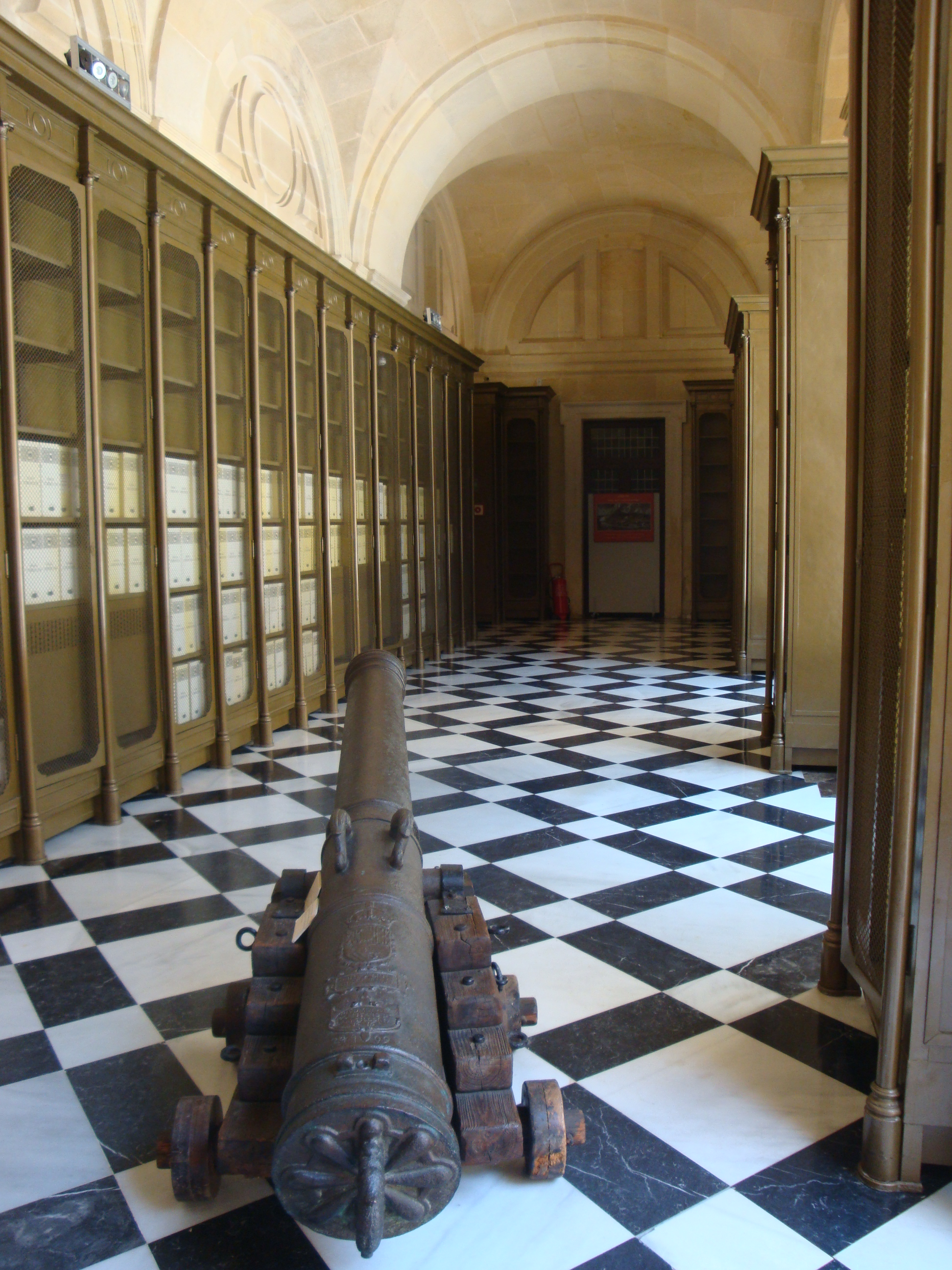
View of a corridor with a cannon.

- Consejo de Indias, Council of the Indies, 16th–19th centuries
- Casa de la Contratación, House of Trade, royal bureaucracy for the monopoly on trade, 16th–18th centuries
- Consulados de Sevilla y Cádiz, Spanish merchant guild located first in the port of Seville, which then relocated to Cádiz, 16th–19th centuries
- Secretarías de Estado y Despacho Universal de Indias, de Estado, Gracia y Justicia, Hacienda y Guerra, 18th–19th centuries
- Secretaría del Juzgado de Arribadas de Cádiz, 18th–19th centuries
- Comisaría Interventora de la Hacienda Pública de Cádiz, Dirección General de la Renta de Correos, 18th–19th centuries
- Sala de Ultramar del Tribunal de Cuentas, 19th century
- Real Compañía de la Habana, 18th–19th centuries

The structure underwent a thorough restoration in 2002–2004, without interrupting its function as a research library. As of 2005, its 15 million pages are in the process of being digitized. The digitized sources are accessible online.
