= The Vision of Saint Anthony of Padua (Murillo) =

Painting by Bartolomé Esteban Murillo

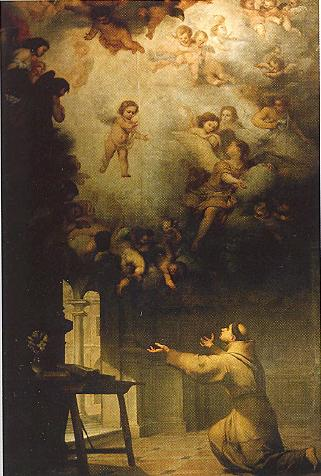
The Vision of Saint Anthony of Padua (1656), by Bartolomé Esteban Murillo

The Vision of Saint Anthony of Padua is a 1656 oil on canvas painting by Bartolomé Esteban Murillo, commissioned by the chapter of Seville Cathedral as the altarpiece for its chapel of Saint Anthony of Padua, where it still hangs. It replaced an altarpiece by Bernardo Simón de Pineda.

== History ==
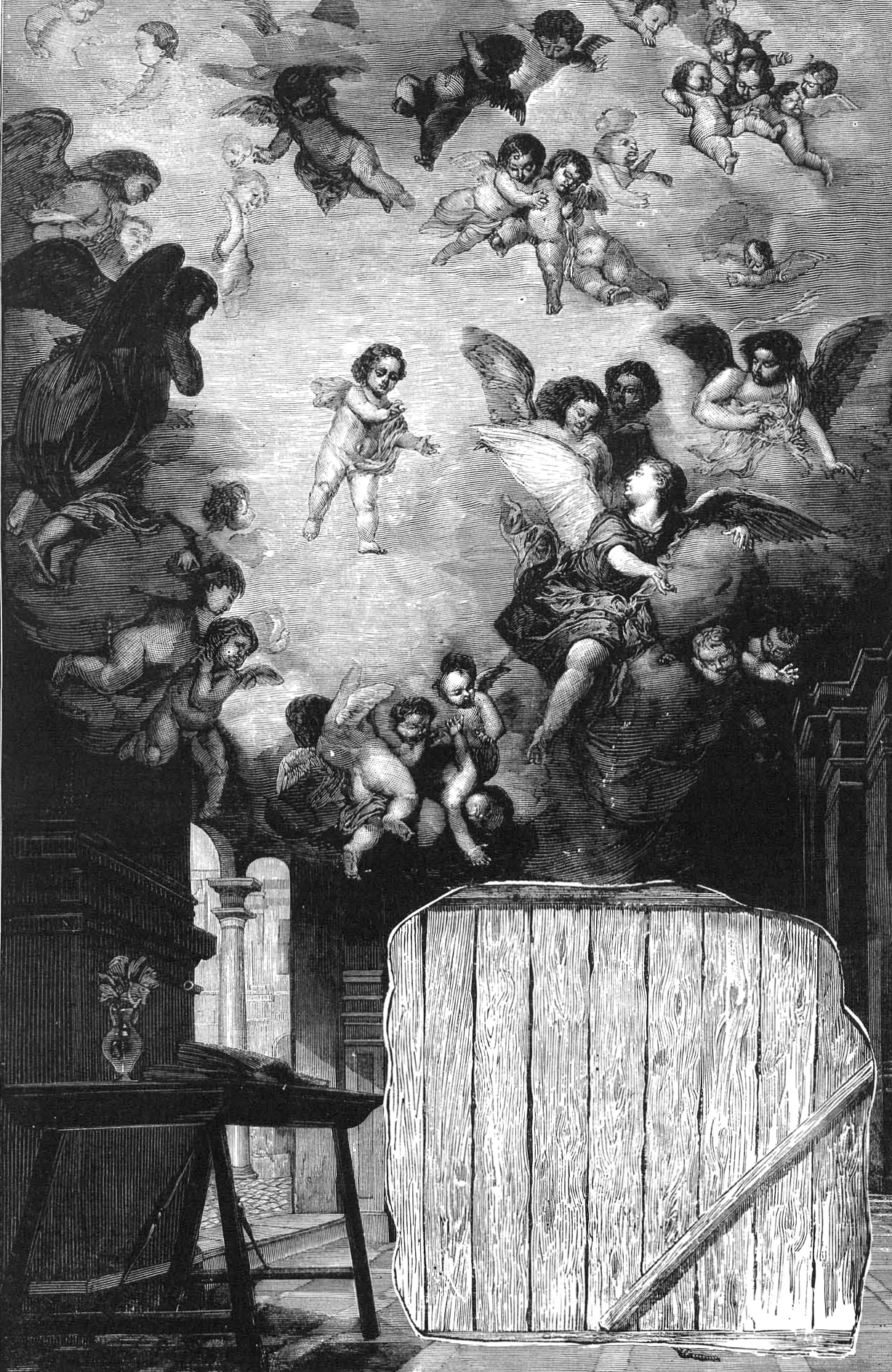
Photograph of the work after it was vandalised, La Ilustración Española y Americana 15 November 1874, n. 42, p. 665.

During the French occupation of Seville in the Peninsula War, the cathedral treasury was sacked by troops under Nicolas Jean-de-Dieu Soult. Murillo's Immaculate Conception and Birth of the Virgin were taken and Vision was almost also taken, but the town council proposed exchanging it for Nativity of the Virgin and so it remained in the chapel.

On the morning of November 5, 1874, a sacristan of the cathedral discovered that thieves had cut out the portion depicting Saint Anthony. Then, on January 2, 1875, a Spanish immigrant calling himself Fernando Garcia attempted to sell the same fragment to a New York City art gallery. The man stated it was a complete original by Murillo, Saint Anthony being one of the artist's favorite subjects. The owner of the gallery, Hermann Schaus, identified it as the missing "St. Anthony" that the Seville Government had widely advertised, negotiated a price of $250 and contacted the Spanish consulate. Upon securing the sale, Schaus sent it to the Spanish Consulate, which shipped it to Seville via Havana and Cadiz, was returned to the cathedral and added back into the work in 1875 by the restorer Salvador Martínez Cubells.

The spanish immigrant who had sold the painting to Schaus was taken to Havana, Cuba, and inspected. However, he was subsequently, inexplicably released.
