= Pedro Sánchez Falconete =

Spanish architect

Pedro Sánchez Falconete was a Spanish architect from Seville.

He is known as the completer of the palatial urban structure that houses the Archivo General de Indias in the city of Seville.

In 1644, on the foundations of the medieval Hospital de la Caridad in Seville, a new church was erected to plans of Falconete, altered in the long, slow course of construction by Leonardo de Figueroa.

At the Iglesia del Sagrario he designed the Puerta del Perdón and another grand doorway. The modifications of the Iglesia de Santa María la Blanca are also to his design.
