= Seville Cathedral =

Catholic cathedral in Seville, Spain

- Cathedral of Saint Mary of the See; Catedral de Santa María de la Sede
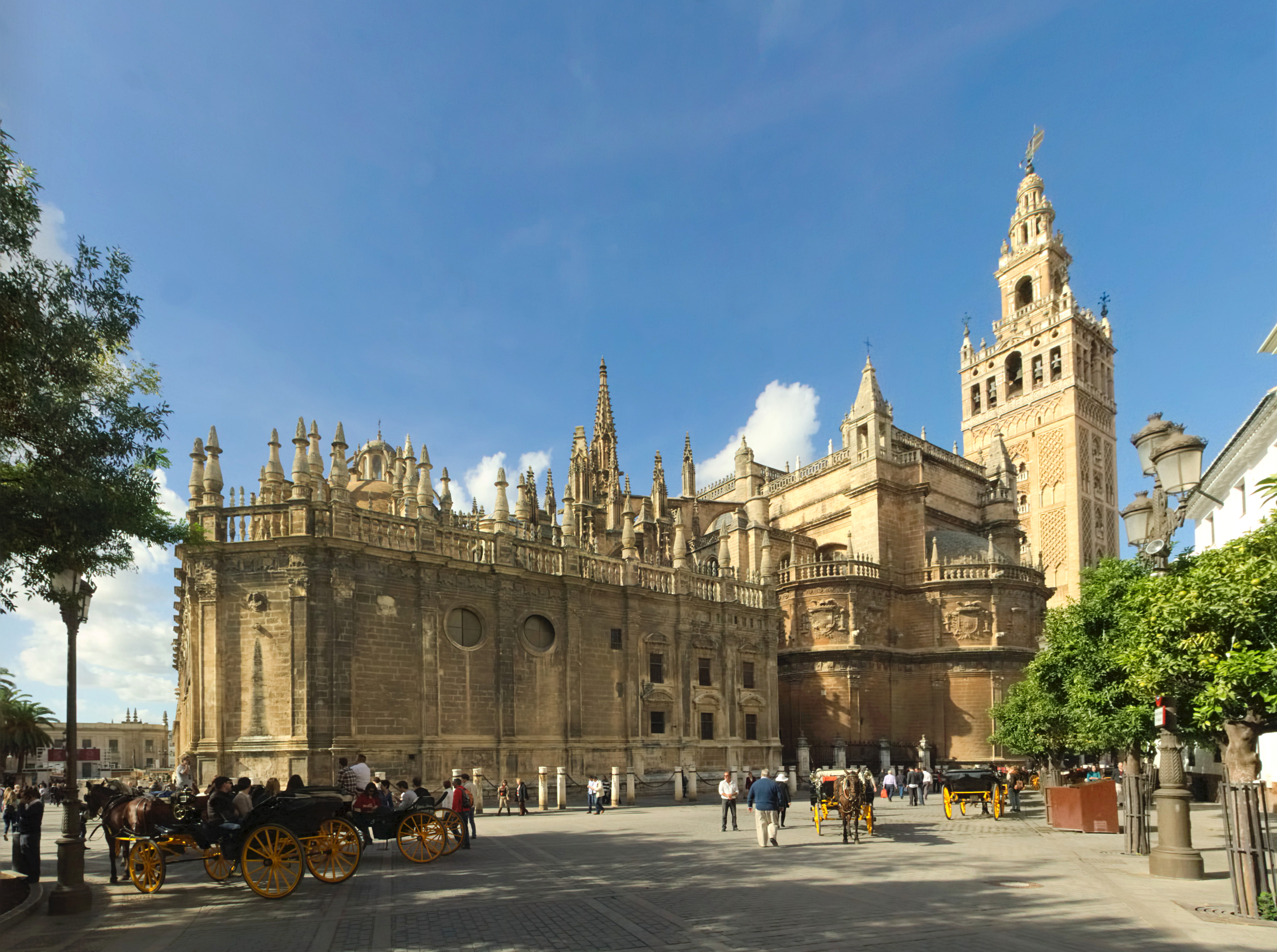
- View of the southeastern side of the cathedral
- Seville Cathedral
- 37°23′9.22″N 5°59′35.00″W
- Location: Seville
- Country: Spain
- Denomination: Catholic Church
- Sui iuris church: Latin Church
- Website: www.catedraldesevilla.es

History
- Status: Cathedral
- Consecrated: 1507

Architecture
- Functional status: Active
- Architectural type: Church
- Style: Gothic, Moorish, and Renaissance
- Groundbreaking: 1402
- Completed: 1519

Specifications
- Length: 135 m (443 ft)
- Width: 100 m (330 ft)
- Height: 36 m (118 ft)

Administration
- Archdiocese: Seville

Clergy
- Archbishop: José Ángel Saiz Meneses

UNESCO World Heritage Site
- Official name: Cathedral, Alcázar and Archivo de Indias in Seville
- Type: Cultural
- Criteria: i, ii, iii, vi
- Designated: 1987 (11th session), modified 2010
- Reference no.: 383bis-001
- Region: Europe and North America

Spanish Cultural Heritage
- Official name: Catedral de Santa María de la Sede de Sevilla
- Type: Real property
- Criteria: Monument
- Designated: 29 December 1928
- Reference no.: (R.I.) - 51 - 0000329 - 00000

The Cathedral of Saint Mary of the See (Spanish: Catedral de Santa María de la Sede), better known as Seville Cathedral (Catedral de Sevilla), is a Catholic cathedral in Seville, Andalusia, Spain. It was registered in 1987 by UNESCO as a World Heritage Site, along with the adjoining Alcázar palace complex and the General Archive of the Indies. It is one of the largest churches in the world and the largest Gothic cathedral.

After its completion in the early 16th century, Seville Cathedral supplanted Hagia Sophia as the largest cathedral in the world, a title the Byzantine church had held for a thousand years. The Gothic section alone has a length of 126 m (413 ft), a width of 76 m (249 ft), and a central nave height of 36 m (118 ft) (40 m (130 ft) at the crossing). The total height of the Giralda tower from the ground to the weather vane is 104.5 m (342 ft 10 in). The Archbishop's Palace is located on the northeastern side of the cathedral.

Seville Cathedral was the site of the baptism of Infante Juan of Aragon in 1478, only son of the Catholic Monarchs Ferdinand II of Aragon and Isabella I of Castile. Its royal chapel holds the remains of the city's conqueror, Ferdinand III of Castile, his son and heir, Alfonso the Wise, and their descendant, King Peter the Cruel. The funerary monuments for cardinals Juan de Cervantes and Pedro González de Mendoza are located among its chapels. Christopher Columbus and his son Diego are also buried in the cathedral.

== Construction and history ==
=== Almohad mosque (1172–1248) ===
The Almohad caliph Abu Yaqub Yusuf ordered the construction of a new grand mosque for the city in 1172 on the south end of the city. The new mosque was dedicated in 1182, but was not completed until 1198. It supplanted the one built between 829 and 830 by Umar Ibn Adabbas on the site of the present-day collegiate church of Divino Salvador, as the main mosque in the city. Larger and closer to the city's alcázar, the mosque was designed by architect Ahmad ben Basso as a 113-by-135-metre (371 ft × 443 ft) rectangular building with a surface of over 15,000 m^{2} (160,000 sq ft), including a minaret and ablutions courtyard. Its prayer hall consisted of seventeen aisles oriented southward, perpendicular to its qibla wall, in the manner of many mosques of Al-Andalus, including the mosque of Ibn Adabbas.

=== "Christianized mosque" (1248–1401) ===
Shortly after Seville's conquest by Ferdinand III, Yaqub Yusuf's mosque was converted into the city's cathedral. Its orientation was changed and its spaces partitioned and adorned to suit Christian worship practices. The internal space was gradually divided into chapels by constructing walls in the bays along the northern and southern walls. Almost the entire eastern half of the cathedral was occupied by the royal chapel that would hold the bodies of Ferdinand, his wife and Alfonso the Wise.

=== Gothic cathedral (after 1401) ===
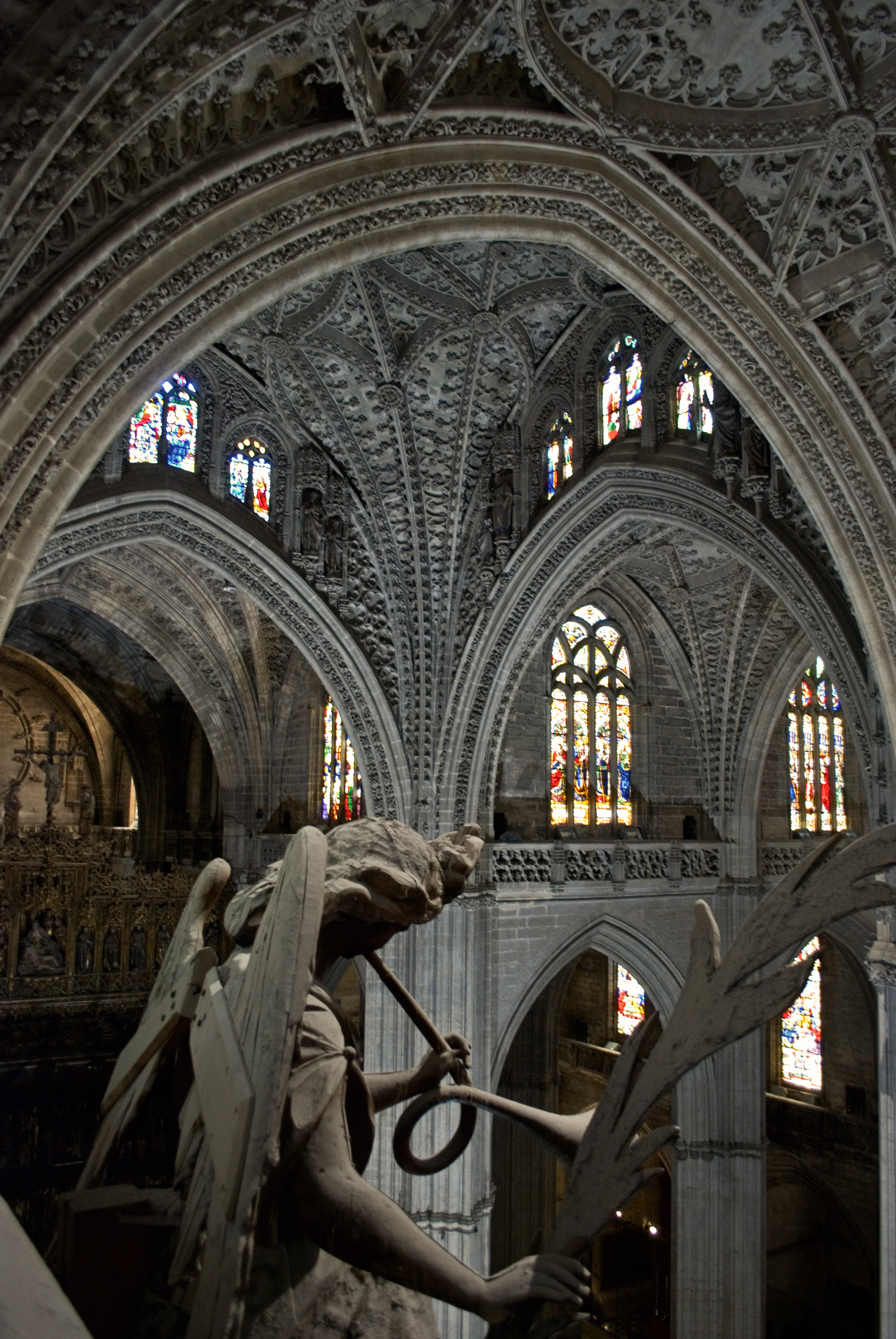
Interior of the cathedral

Seville Cathedral was built to demonstrate the city's wealth, as it had become a major trading center in the years after the Reconquista in 1248. In July 1401, city leaders decided to build a new cathedral to replace the grand mosque that served as the cathedral until then. According to local oral tradition, the members of the cathedral chapter said: "Hagamos una Iglesia tan hermosa y tan grandiosa que los que la vieren labrada nos tengan por locos" ("Let us build a church so beautiful and so grand that those who see it finished will take us for mad"). The actual entry from 8 July 1401, recorded among others by Juan Cean Bermudes in 1801 but now lost, proposed building "una tal y tan buena, que no haya otra su igual" ("one so good that none will be its equal).

Work began in 1402 and continued for over a century. The precise date when construction began is not certain, but some sources date it to 1433. Several factors, including royal resistance to the temporary relocation of the royal chapel delayed construction. In 1433, King John II of Castille allowed the temporary transportation of the royal bodies from the old Capilla Real ('Royal Chapel') – including those of Alfonso X, Beatrice of Swabia, Ferdinand III, Peter the Cruel, and María de Padilla – to the cathedral's cloister for storage.

The clergy of the parish offered half their stipends to pay for architects, artists, stained glass artisans, masons, carvers, craftsman and labourers and other expenses. Due to the size of the building and the cramped nature of the urban fabric around it, demolition and construction took place in different stages. Construction began at the building's northeast corner and continued on its eastern end. After the permission granted by John II, the old Capilla Real on the cathedral's east side was demolished to allow work to continue.

A number of architects worked on the project, often from other countries. In 1434, a Dutch master named Ysambert was placed in charge. He was followed from 1439 to 1454 by a French master named Carlín, and then by Juán Normán until 1472. After 1472 there were two master masons in charge, probably in an attempt to accelerate work. They were succeeded in 1497 by a Master Ximón (possibly Simón de Colonia), who was then succeeded in 1502 by Alfonso Rodríguez until 1513.

By 1467 the eastern part of the cathedral had been completed. The stained glass windows were made after 1478 by Enrique Aleman. The enormous retable was designed in 1482 by Dutch artist Pieter Dancart, who worked on it until his death in 1487, when it was still unfinished. The crossing lantern (cimborrio) was completed before 1502 by Ximón and construction of the cathedral was completed in 1506–7.

In 1511, however, the crossing lantern and some of the vaults collapsed, necessitating reconstruction. After some debate, the current crossing lantern, with its ornate lierne vaulting, was designed by Juan Gil de Hontañón the Elder in 1513 and completed in 1519. In 1526 the central part of Dancart's retable was complete, but its side sections were only completed between 1550 and 1594. After the completion of the Gothic cathedral, Seville's subsequent prosperity resulted in many additions to the building in Renaissance and Plateresque style.

The crossing again collapsed in 1888, and work on the dome continued until at least 1903. The 1888 collapse occurred due to an earthquake and resulted in the destruction of "every precious object below" the dome at that time.

== Description ==
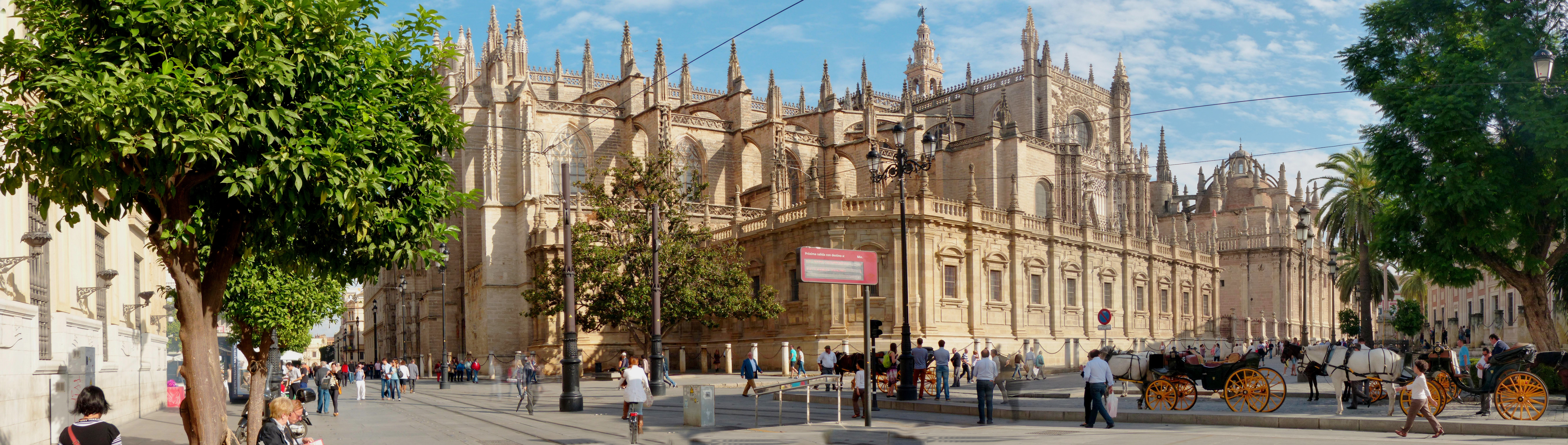

The interior has the longest nave of any cathedral in Spain. The central nave rises to a height of 42 m (138 ft). In the main body of the cathedral, the most noticeable features are the great boxlike choir loft, which fills the central portion of the nave, and the vast Gothic retable of carved scenes from the life of Christ.

The builders preserved some elements from the ancient mosque. The mosque's sahn, that is, the courtyard for ablutions for the faithful to conduct their ritual cleansing before entering the prayer hall is known today as the Patio de los Naranjos. It contains a fountain and orange trees. However, the most well known is its minaret, which was converted into a bell tower known as the Giralda, a major symbol of the city.

== Giralda ==
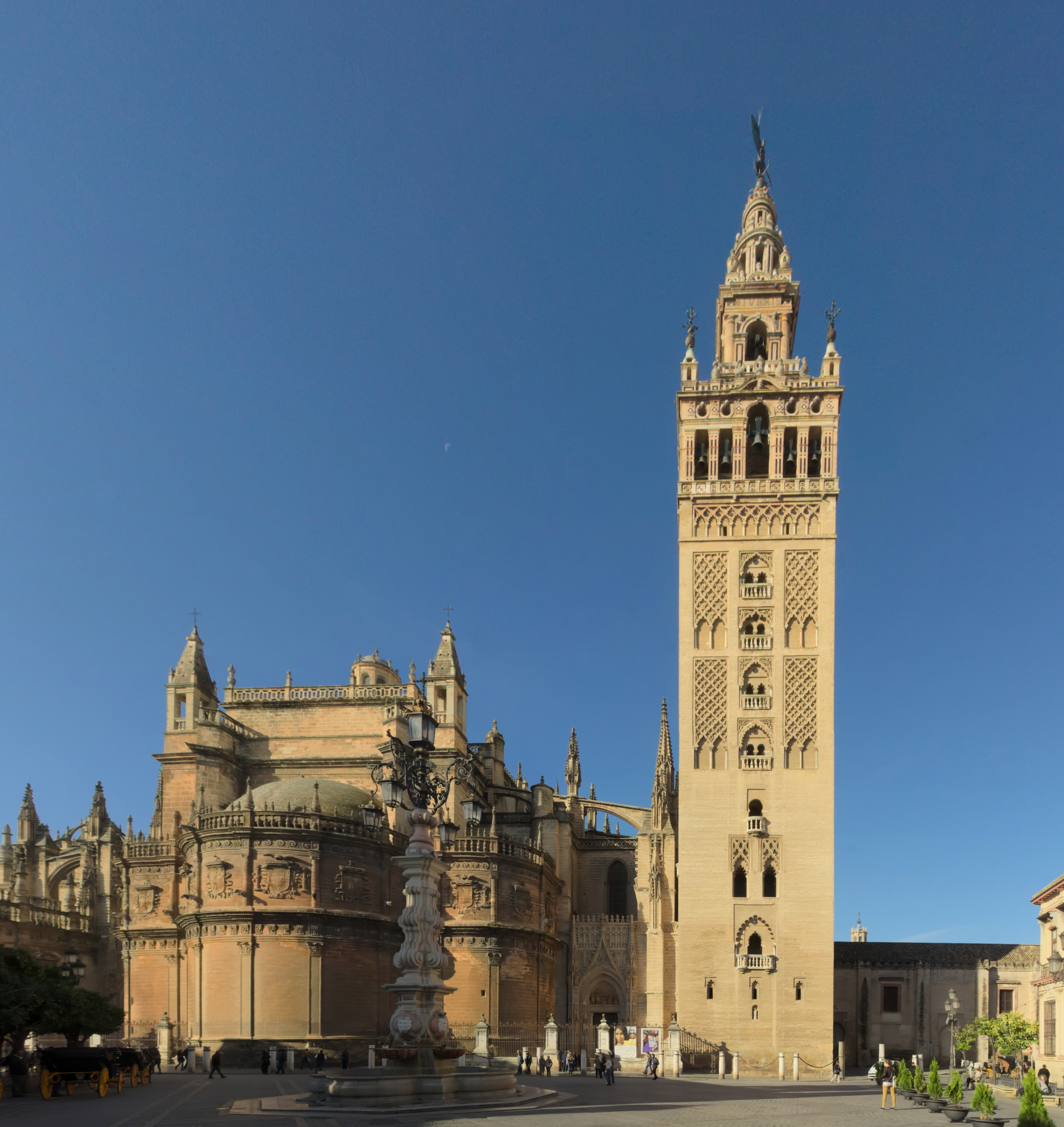
La Giralda

The Giralda is the bell tower of the Cathedral of Seville. Its height is 105 m (343 ft) and its square base is 7.0 m (23 ft) above sea level and 13 m (44 ft) long per side. The Giralda is the former minaret of the mosque that stood on the site under Muslim rule, and was built to resemble the minaret of the Koutoubia Mosque in Marrakesh, Morocco. It was converted into a bell tower for the cathedral after the Reconquista, although the topmost section dates from the Renaissance. The tower is 104.5 m in height and was one of the most important symbols in the medieval city. Construction began in 1184 under the direction of architect Ben Ahmad Baso. According to the chronicler Ibn Sahib al-Salah, the works were completed on 10 March 1198, with the placement of four gilt bronze balls in the top section of the tower. After a strong earthquake in 1365, the spheres were missing. In the 16th century the belfry was added by the architect Hernán Ruiz the Younger, which hides the Almohad lantern; the statue on its top, called "El Giraldillo", was installed in 1568 to represent the triumph of the Christian faith.

== Doors ==
Seville Cathedral has fifteen doors on its four façades. The major doors are:

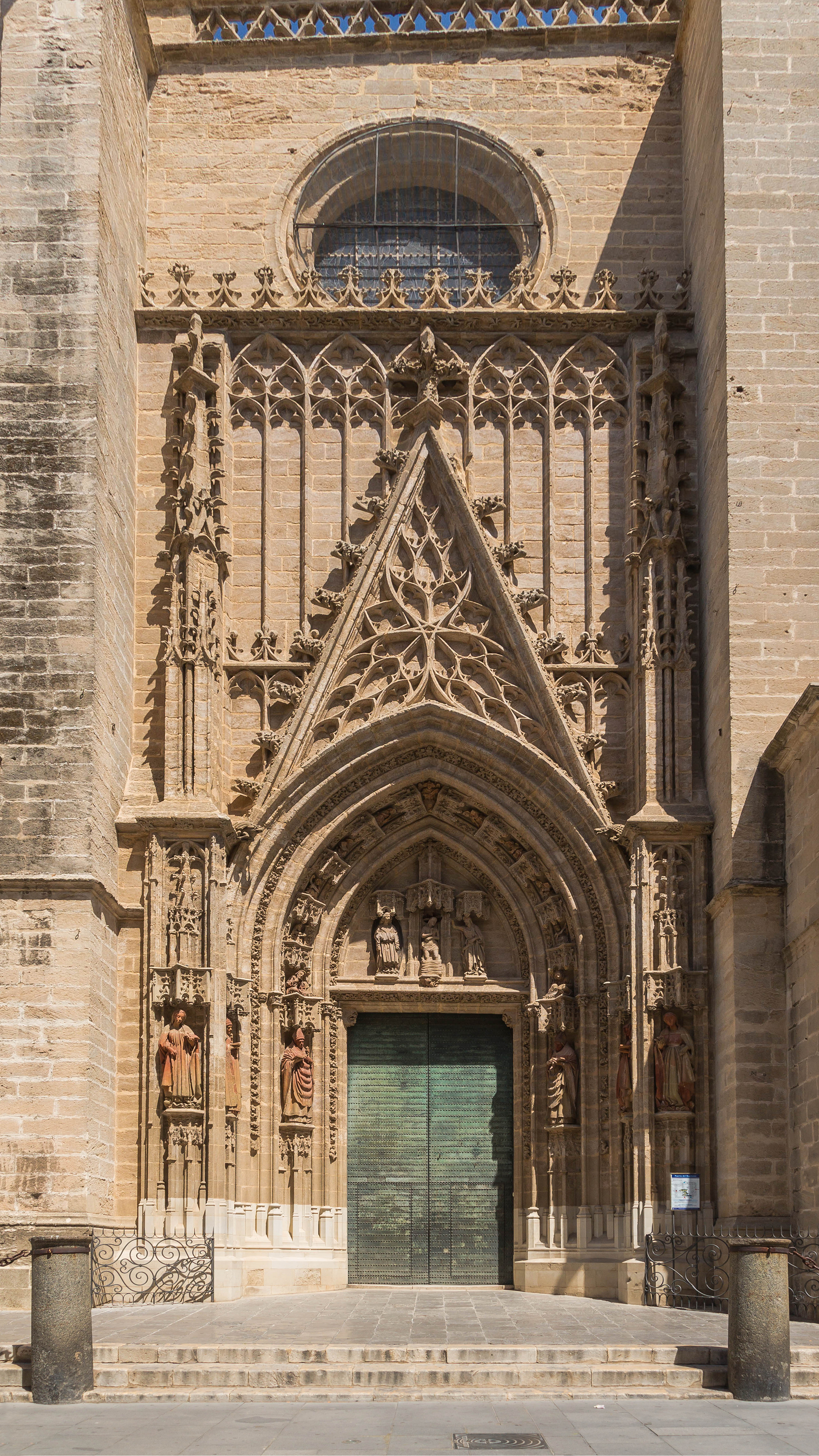
Door of Baptism

=== West façade ===
The Door of Baptism, on the left side, was built in the 15th century and decorated with a scene depicting the baptism of Jesus, created by the workshop of Lorenzo Mercadante of Brittany. It is of Gothic style with a pointed archivolt decorated with tracery. It contains sculptures of the brothers Saint Isidore and Saint Leander and the sisters Saints Justa and Rufina, by Lorenzo Mecadante, also a series of angels and prophets by the artisan Pedro Millán. The Main Door or Door of Assumption, in the center of the west façade, is well-preserved and elaborately decorated. Cardinal Cienfuegos y Jovellanos commissioned the artist Ricardo Bellver to carve the relief of the Assumption over the door; it was executed between 1877 and 1898.

The Door of Saint Michael or Door of the Nativity, has sculptures representing the birth of Jesus by Pedro Millán. It was built in the 15th century and is decorated with terracotta sculptures of Saint Laurean, Saint Hermengild and the Four Evangelists. Today, this door is used for the Holy Week processions.

=== South façade ===
The Door of Saint Christopher or De la Lonja (1887–1895) of the south transept, was designed by Adolfo Fernandez Casanova and completed in 1917; it was originally designed by the architect Demetrio de los Rios in 1866. A replica of the "Giraldillo" stands in front of its gate.

=== North façade ===
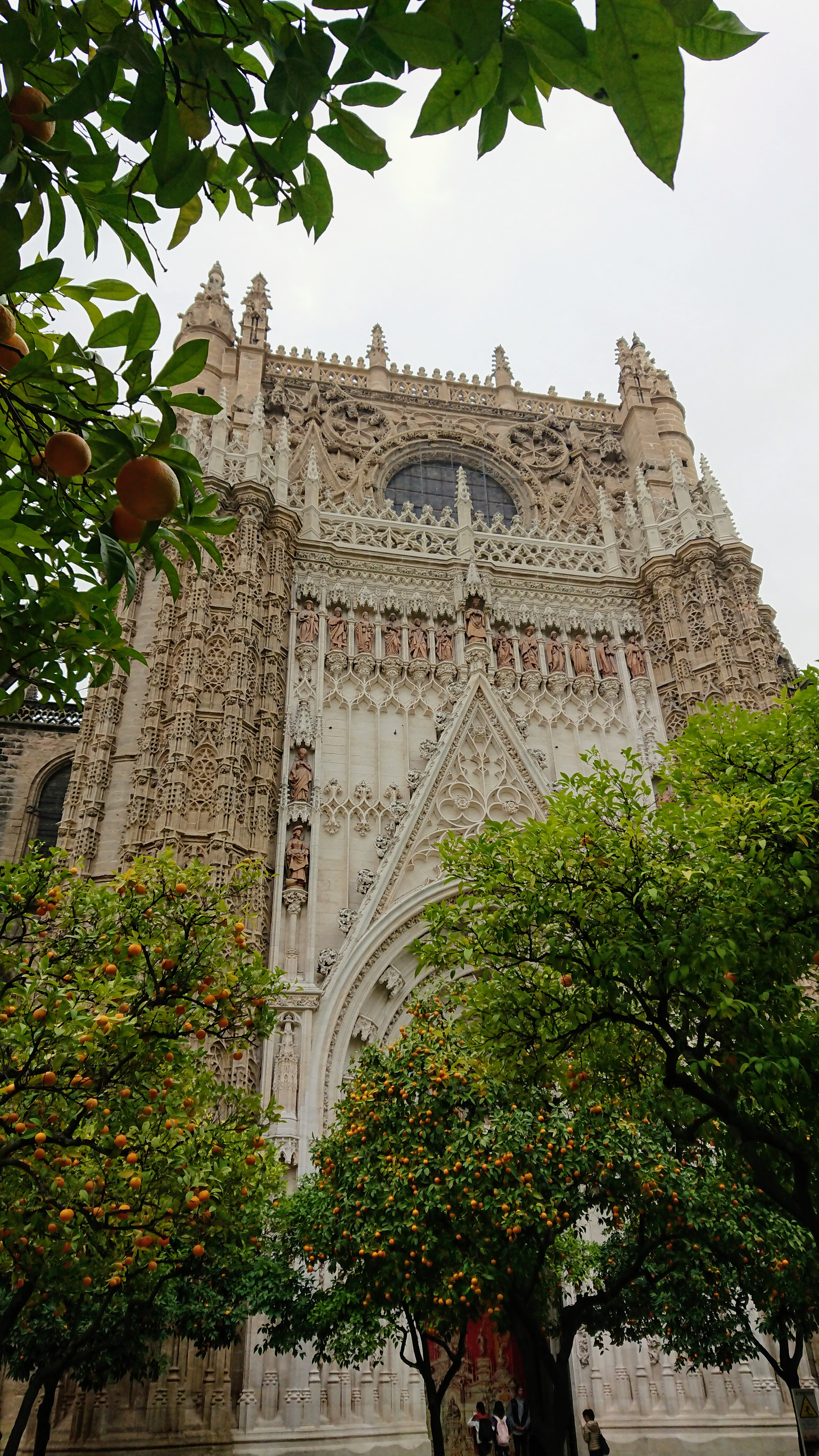
Door of the Conception, in the North façade

The Door of the Conception (1895–1927, Puerta de la Concepción) opens onto the Court of the Oranges (Patio de los Naranjos) and is kept closed except on festival days. It was designed by Demetrio de los Rios and finished by Adolfo Fernandez Casanova in 1895. It was built in the Gothic style to harmonize with the rest of the building.

The Door of the Lizard (Puerta del Lagarto) leads from the Court of the Oranges; it is named for the stuffed crocodile hanging from the ceiling.

The Door of the Sanctuary (Puerta del Sagrario) provides access to the sanctuary. Designed by Pedro Sanchez Falconete in the last third of the 17th century, it is framed by Corinthian columns with a sculpture on top representing King Ferdinand III of Castile next to the Saints Isidore, Leander, Justa and Rufina.

Door of Forgiveness (Puerta del Perdón) gives access to the Patio de los Naranjos (Patio of the Oranges) from Calle Alemanes and therefore is not really a door of the cathedral. It belonged to the ancient mosque and retains its horseshoe arch shape from that time. In the early 16th century it was adorned with terracotta sculptures by the sculptor Miguel Perrin, highlighting the great relief of the Purification on the entrance arch. The plaster ornaments were made by Bartolomé López.

=== East façade ===
The Door of Sticks or the Adoration of the Magi (Puerta de Palos or Puerta de la Adoración de los Magos) decorated with sculptures by Lope Marin in 1548, has a relief of the Adoration of the Magi at the top, executed by Miguel Perrin in 1520. The name "Palos" or "Sticks" is due to the wooden railing which separates that area from the rest of the building.

Door of the Bells (Puerta de las Campanillas) was so named because at the time of its construction the bells to call the workers were rung there. The Renaissance sculptures and the relief on the tympanum representing Christ's Entry into Jerusalem were made by Lope Marin in 1548.

== Chapels ==
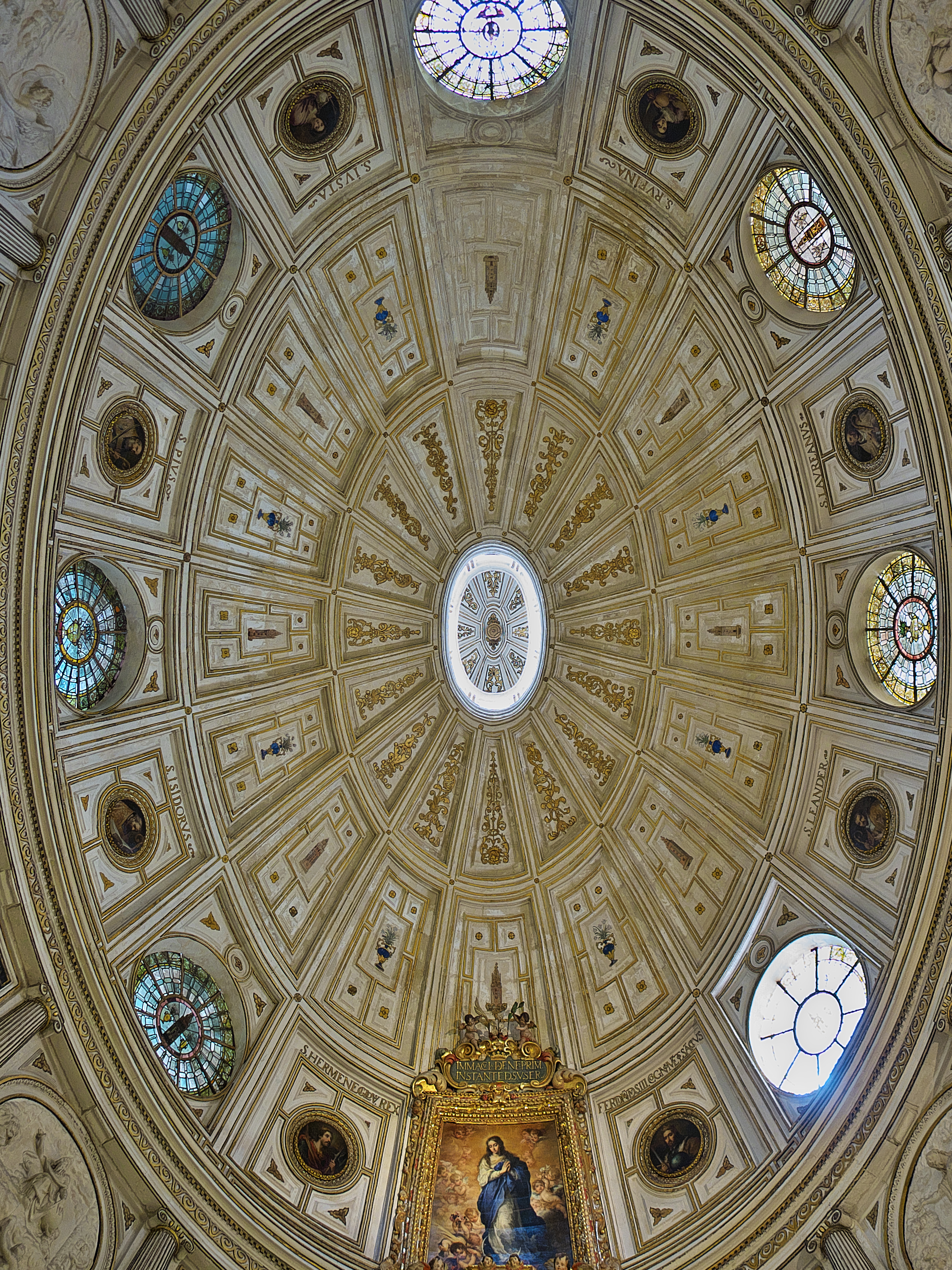
Renaissance dome

The cathedral has 80 chapels, including the Capilla Real. It was reported in 1896 that 500 masses were said daily in the chapels. The baptistery Chapel of Saint Anthony contains the painting of The Vision of St. Anthony (1656) by Bartolomé Esteban Murillo. In November 1874, it was discovered that thieves had cut out the portion depicting Saint Anthony. Then, in January 1875, a Spanish immigrant attempted to sell the same fragment to a New York City art gallery. The man stated it was a complete original by Murillo, Saint Anthony being one of the artist's favorite subjects. The owner of the gallery, Hermann Schaus, negotiated a price of $250 and contacted the Spanish consulate. Upon securing the sale, Schaus sent it to the Spanish Consulate, which shipped it to Seville via Havana and Cadiz. It was returned to the cathedral and added back into the work in 1875 by the restorer Salvador Martínez Cubells.

== Organ ==
The cathedral originally hosted a pair of historic instruments: a Gospel organ by Jordi Bosch, finished in 1793, and an Epistle organ by Valentín and José Valentín Verdalonga, finished in 1831. Neither survived the 1888 earthquake. They were replaced in 1901–1903 with twin organs by Aquilino Amezua. These were converted to electrical control in 1973 and are now played from a single four-manual console on the floor between them. The organ was then reworked by Gerhard Grenzing in 1996, adding some more traditional Baroque capabilities to this romantic-symphonic instrument.

== Composers ==
In the sixteenth century, which has been described as a golden age of Spanish polyphony, several of Spain's leading composers were active as choirmasters (maestro de capilla) at Seville cathedral. The most renowned of these are Francisco Guerrero, who worked there for a significant portion of his career (including as assistant choirmaster, 1551–1574, and choirmaster from 1574 to his death in 1599), and Alonso Lobo, who was a choirboy at Seville cathedral in the 1560s and returned there in 1604, five years after Guerrero's death, to take up the post of choirmaster. Cristóbal de Morales, though primarily active in Rome, worked at the cathedral for a period in the mid-sixteenth century. Among notable composers active at Seville cathedral in later centuries are Eduardo Torres, who was organist and choirmaster from 1910–1924.

== Timeline ==
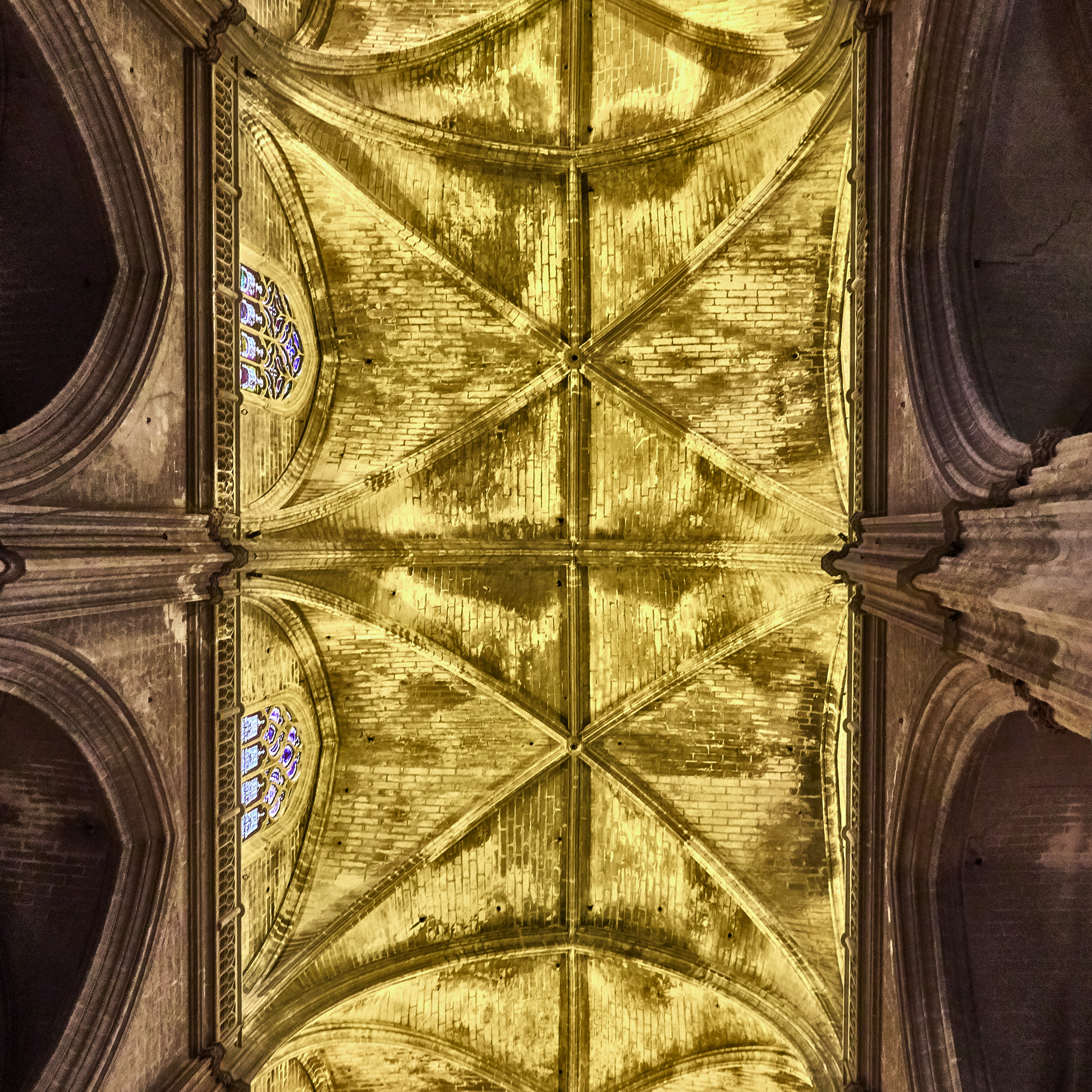
Golden ceiling, main nave, Seville Cathedral

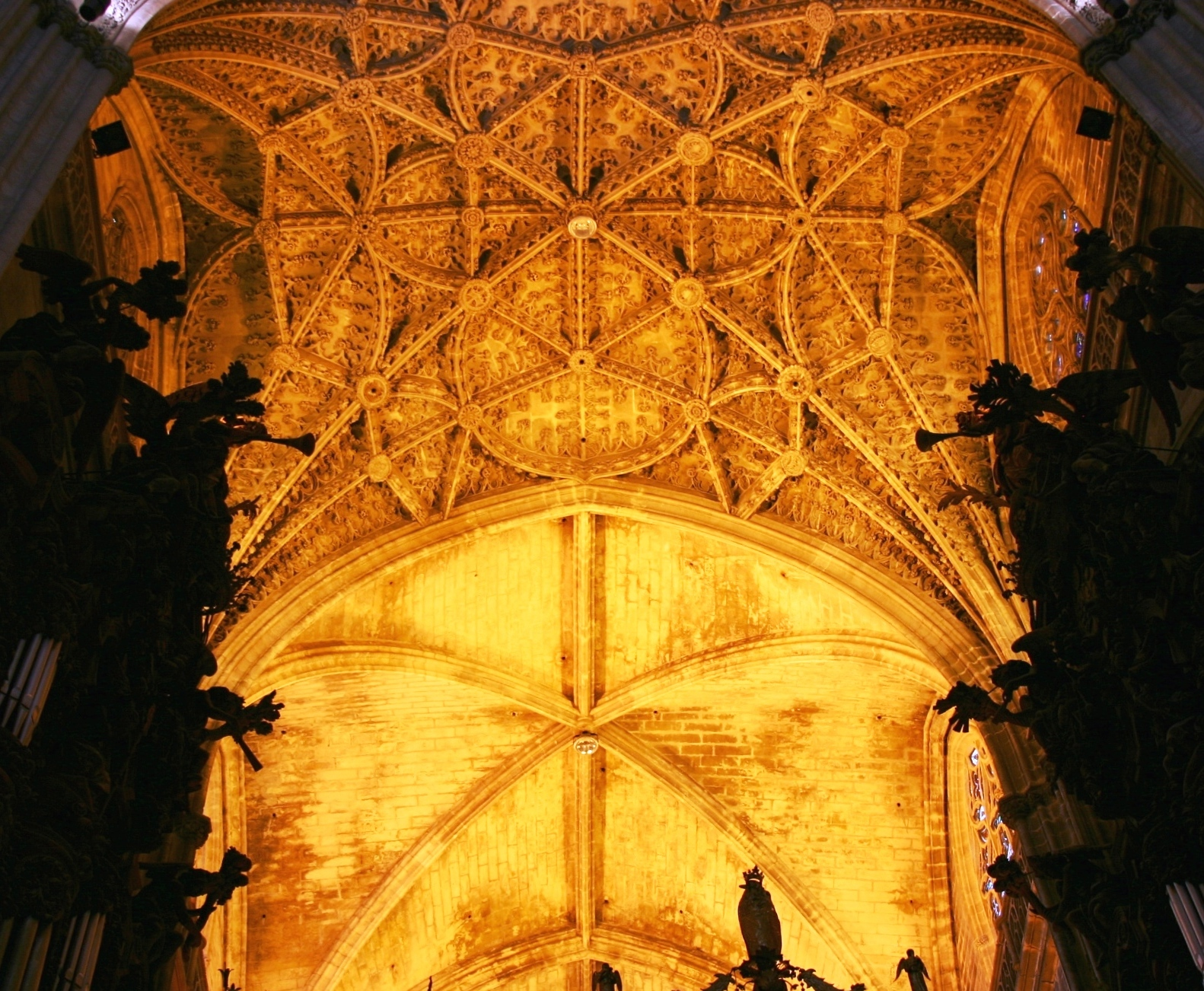
Ceiling over the choir

- 1184 – Construction of the Almohad mosque begun
- 1198 – Completion of the mosque
- 1248 – Conquest of Seville by Ferdinand III, the mosque Christianized
- 1356 and 1362 – Two earthquakes destroy minaret, replaced by bell gable
- 1401 – (8 July) Decision made to replace former mosque
- 1402 – Nave begun- SW corner
- 1432 – Nave completed, east end started
- 1466 – Demolition of Royal Chapel authorized by Juan II of Castile
- 1467 – East end completed, vaults begun. Anchors added.
- 1475 – Stalls begun
- 1478 – Stalls completed
- 1481 – Doorways in high altar completed
- 1482 – Retable begun
- 1498 – Vaults completed, lantern begun
- 1506 – Main dome (lantern) completed
- 1511 – Lantern collapses, rebuilding begins
- 1515 – New choir vaults completed
- 1517 – New transept vaults completed
- 1519 – Lantern rebuilding completed
- 1526 – Retable completed
- 1551 – Capilla Real begun
- 1558 – Belfry replaces bell gable
- 1568 – Giralda, top stages
- 1575 – Capilla Real completed
- 1593 – Chapterhouse (Sala Capitular) completed
- 1793 – Epistle organ finished
- 1831 – Gospel organ finished
- 1888 – Main dome and vaults collapse

== Burials ==
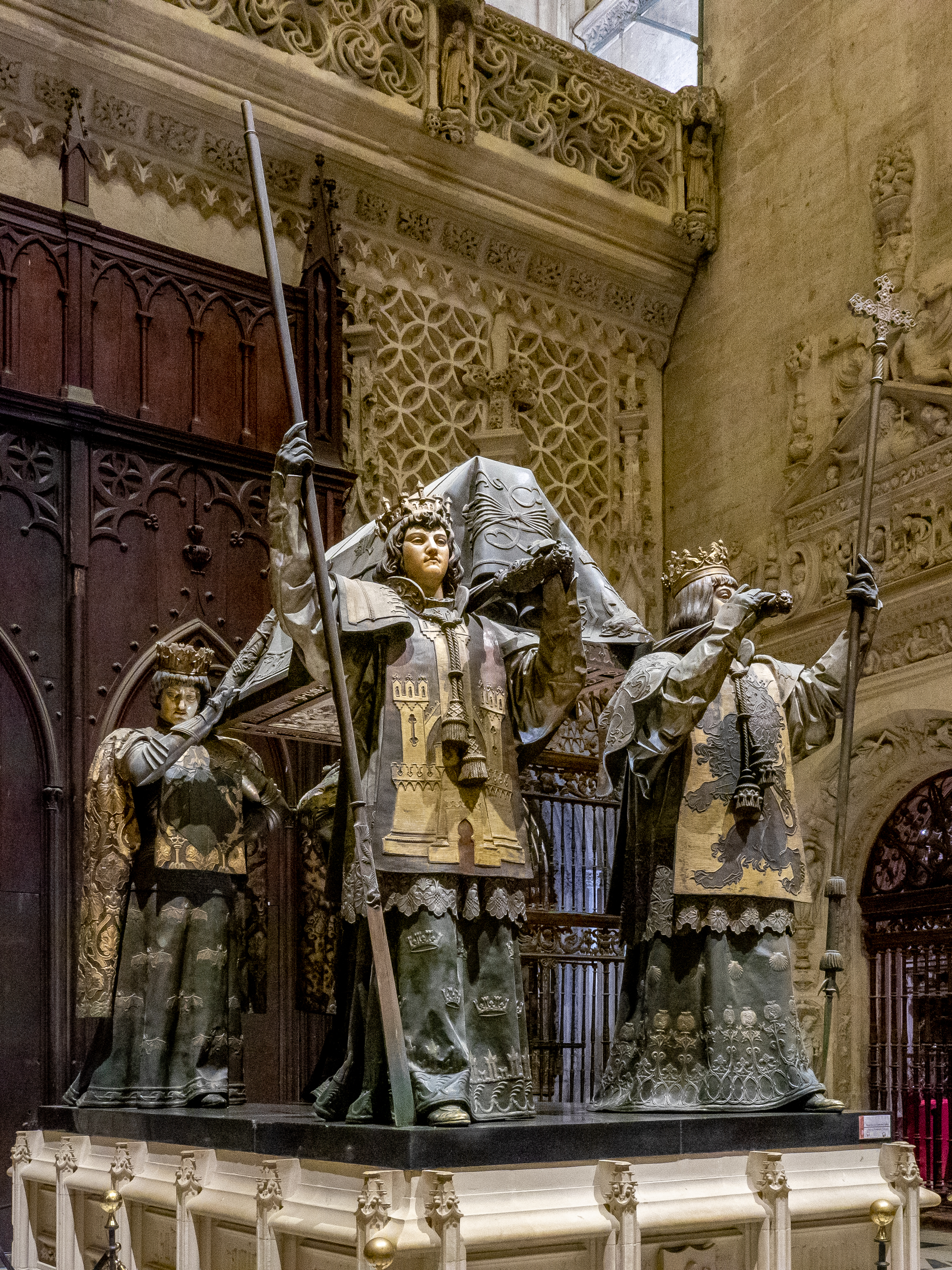
Tomb of Columbus

- Christopher Columbus
- Diego Columbus
- Ferdinand Columbus
- Fernando III of Castile
- Elisabeth of Hohenstaufen, Queen of Castile
- Alfonso X of Castile
- Pedro I of Castile
- María de Padilla, Queen of Castile
- Fadrique Alfonso de Castile, illegitimate son of Alfonso XI de Castile and Eleanor de Guzmán; Master of the Order of Santiago
- Diego Hurtado de Mendoza, Archbishop of Seville
- Francisco Javier Cienfuegos, Archbishop of Seville
- Diego de Deza, Grand Inquisitor of Spain, Archbishop of Seville
- Joaquín Lluch y Garrija, Cardinal, Archbishop of Seville

== See also ==
- 12 Treasures of Spain
- 16th-century Western domes

== Sources ==
- Bloom, Jonathan M. (2020). Architecture of the Islamic West: North Africa and the Iberian Peninsula, 700-1800. Yale University Press.
- Harvey, John (1957). The Cathedrals of Spain. Batsford.
- Montiel, Luis Martínez; Morales, Alfredo José (1999). The Cathedral of Seville. Scala Publishers. ISBN 978-1-85759-203-0.
- Melton, J. Gordon (2010). "Hagia Sophia". In Melton, J. Gordon; Baumann, Martin (eds.). Religions of the World: A Comprehensive Encyclopedia of Beliefs and Practices (2nd ed.). Santa Barbara: ABC-CLIO. pp. 1300–1301. ISBN 978-1-59884-204-3.
