= Demographics of Portugal =

- Population pyramid of Portugal as of 2023
- Population: ▲11,424,031 (2025)
- Density: 123.9/km^{2} (321/sq mi) (2025)
- Growth rate: 0.3% (2025)
- Birth rate: 7.7 births/1,000 population (2025)
- Death rate: 10.7 deaths/1,000 population (2025)
- Life expectancy: 82.7 years (2024)
  - male: 79.8 years (2024)
  - female: 85.4 years (2024)
- Fertility rate: ▲1.30 children (2025)
- Infant mortality: 2.8 deaths/1,000 live births (2025)
- Net migration rate: 6.2 migrant(s)/1,000 population (2025)
- Immigrant share: 14.0% (2025)

Age structure
- 0–14 years: 12.3% (2025)
- 15–64 years: 64.4% (2025)
- 65 and over: 23.3% (2025)

Sex ratio
- Total: 0.9 male(s)/female (2024)
- At birth: 1.05 male(s)/female
- Under 15: 1.05 male(s)/female
- 15–64 years: 0.97 male(s)/female
- 65 and over: 0.66 male(s)/female

Nationality
- Nationality: Portuguese citizen
- Major ethnic: Portuguese
- Minor ethnic: Afro-Portuguese; Others

Language
- Official: Portuguese
- Spoken: Languages of Portugal

Demographic features of the population of Portugal include population density, ethnicity, education level, health of the populace, economic status, religious affiliations and other aspects of the population. As of 2025, Portugal had an estimated population of 11,424,031 inhabitants. Its population density, at 123.9 inhabitants per square kilometre (321/sq mi), is higher than that of most EU countries, moderately surpassing the EU average of 105.4 inhabitants per square kilometre (273/sq mi).

High fertility and birth rates persisted until the 1980s, after which they started to dramatically decline, leading to rapid population aging. At the end of the first decade of the 21st century, almost one in five Portuguese was over 65 years old. Lately, Portugal has been experiencing a short growth in birth rates. The total fertility rate has climbed from an all-time low of 1.21 children per woman in 2013 to 1.43 in 2022, still well below replacement level.

Portugal is a fairly linguistically and religiously homogeneous country. Ethnically, the Portuguese people form a big majority of the total population in Portugal. The Portuguese people are mainly a combination of ancient paleolithic populations, and the proto-Celtic, Celtic, and the para-Celtic Lusitanians. Some other groups, like the Romans, Germanic (Visigoths, Suevi, Buri, Alans and Vandals) and later the Moorish (Arabs and Berber), Sephardic Jewish, and the French also passed through the country.

Today, Brazilians, Britons, Indians, Italians, French, Ukrainians, Nepalis and countries members of PALOP (Portuguese-speaking African countries) are the main immigrants and form the major foreign communities in the country.

Portuguese is spoken throughout the country, with only some villages near the northern municipality of Miranda do Douro speaking Mirandese, locally recognised as a co-official language.

In the 2020s, Portugal reached 11 million people due to extensive immigration from other countries, most notably the former Portuguese colonies.

== Population ==
Due to a decrease in emigration and an increase in immigration during the late 1990s and early 2000s, Portugal's population grew steadily, reaching a peak of 10,573,479 in December 2009. However, following the 2008 financial crisis, emigration surged and immigration declined, and these trends, combined with persistently low birth rates and an aging population, led to a gradual population decline. By 2018, the population had decreased by about 2.27% from its 2009 peak. From then onwards, however, net migration became positive again, supported by a renewed influx of immigrants and a slight rise in birth rates. As a result, Portugal's population resumed growth and, by 2021, had already surpassed the 2009 peak. In 2025, Portugal's statistic service revealed that 10,74 million people lived in Portugal, using the pre-2026 methodology.

In 2026, it became known that Portugal's population exceeded the milestone of 11 million people for the first time. The revelation came after INE revised upwards its population estimates for Portugal in the period 2021-26, as the INE adopted a new methodology to estimate the population of Portugal. The new methodology used from 2026 onwards is aiming to better capture the realities of migratory movements in Portugal, increase the consistency of the population statistics with other official statistics and produce more analytical and detailed population statistics as required by the newer European Union directives.

The distribution of the population is widely uneven; the most densely populated areas are the Lisbon metropolitan area (which contains well above a quarter of the country's population), the metropolitan areas of Porto and the Atlantic coast, while other vast areas are very sparsely populated, like the plateaus of Alentejo, the Trás-os-Montes and Serra da Estrela highlands, and the lesser islands of the Azores archipelago.

View source data.
View source data.
View source data.

Note: Crude migration change (per 1000) is a trend analysis, an extrapolation based average population change (current year minus previous) minus natural change of the current year (see table vital statistics). As average population is an estimate of the population in the middle of the year and not end of the year.

The population of the country almost doubled during the twentieth century (+91%), but the pattern of growth was extremely uneven due to large-scale internal migration from the rural areas to the industrial cities of Lisbon and Porto, a phenomenon which happened as a consequence of the robust economic growth and structural modernisation, owing to a liberalisation of the economy of the 1960s.

Historical population
Year	Pop.	±% p.a.
0	412,924	—
600	367,043	−0.02%
1100	688,207	+0.13%
1400	825,848	+0.06%
1500	1,150,000	+0.33%
1600	1,840,000	+0.47%
1710	2,430,000	+0.25%
1810	3,010,000	+0.21%
1825	3,390,000	+0.80%
1849	3,411,454	+0.03%
1864	4,188,419	+1.38%
1878	4,550,699	+0.59%
1890	5,049,729	+0.87%
1900	5,423,132	+0.72%
1911	5,969,056	+0.88%
1920	6,032,991	+0.12%
1930	6,825,883	+1.24%
1940	7,722,152	+1.24%
1950	8,510,240	+0.98%
1960	8,851,240	+0.39%
1970	8,648,369	−0.23%
1981	9,833,041	+1.17%
1991	9,862,540	+0.03%
2001	10,356,117	+0.49%
2011	10,562,178	+0.20%
2021	10,343,066	−0.21%
2025	11,424,031	+2.52%
Source: INE OWID

Historical population of Portugal

Total population
11,424,031 (2025 official INE estimate)

Age structure of the resident population
2025 official INE estimate:
- 0-14 years: 12.36% (male 722,694 /female 688,913)
- 15-64 years: 64.31% (male 3,711,103 /female 3,635,544)
- 65 years and over: 23.33% (male 1,153,932/female 1,511,845)

Median age
2025 official INE estimate:
- total: 45.8 years
- male: 43.6 years
- female: 48.0 years

Birth rate
7.7 births/1,000 population (2025 official INE estimate)

Death rate
10.7 deaths/1,000 population (2025 official INE estimate)

Total fertility rate
1.30 children born/woman (2025 official INE estimate)

Net migration rate
6.2 net migrant(s)/1,000 population (2025 official INE estimate)

Population growth rate
+ 0.32 % (2025 official INE estimate)

Mother's mean age at first birth
30.3 years (2024 official INE estimate)

Life expectancy at birth

Period	Life expectancy in Years	Period	Life expectancy in Years
1950–1955	60.3	1990–1995	▲74.9
1955–1960	▲62.4	1995–2000	▲76.0
1960–1965	▲64.5	2000–2005	▲77.6
1965–1970	▲66.4	2005–2010	▲79.3
1970–1975	▲68.3	2010–2015	▲80.5
1975–1980	▲70.4	2015–2020	▲81.1
1980–1985	▲72.5	2020–2024	▲82.6
1985–1990	▲74.0		

Source: UN World Population Prospects

Infant mortality rate
2025 official INE estimate:
- total: 2.80 deaths/1,000 live births. Country comparison to the world: 216th
- male: 3.29 deaths/1,000 live births
- female: 2.29 deaths/1,000 live births

Infant mortality rate since 1960

Years	1960	1961	1962	1963	1964	1965	1966	1967	1968	1969	1970	1971	1972	1973	1974	1975
Deaths/1,000 live births	77.5	88.8	78.6	73.1	69.0	64.9	64.7	59.2	61.1	55.8	55.5	51.9	41.4	44.8	37.9	38.9
Years	1976	1977	1978	1979	1980	1981	1982	1983	1984	1985	1986	1987	1988	1989	1990	1991
Deaths/1,000 live births	33.4	30.3	29.1	26.0	24.3	21.8	19.8	19.2	16.7	17.8	15.8	14.3	13.0	12.1	10.9	10.8
Years	1992	1993	1994	1995	1996	1997	1998	1999	2000	2001	2002	2003	2004	2005	2006	2007
Deaths/1,000 live births	9.2	8.6	7.9	7.4	6.8	6.4	6.0	5.6	5.5	5.0	5.0	4.1	3.8	3.5	3.3	3.4
Years	2008	2009	2010	2011	2012	2013	2014	2015	2016	2017	2018	2019	2020	2021	2022	2023
Deaths/1,000 live births	3.3	3.6	2.5	3.1	3.4	2.9	2.9	2.9	3.2	2.7	3.3	2.9	2.4	2.4	2.6	2.5
Years	2024	2025														
Deaths/1,000 live births	3.0	2.8														

Life expectancy in Portugal since 1940

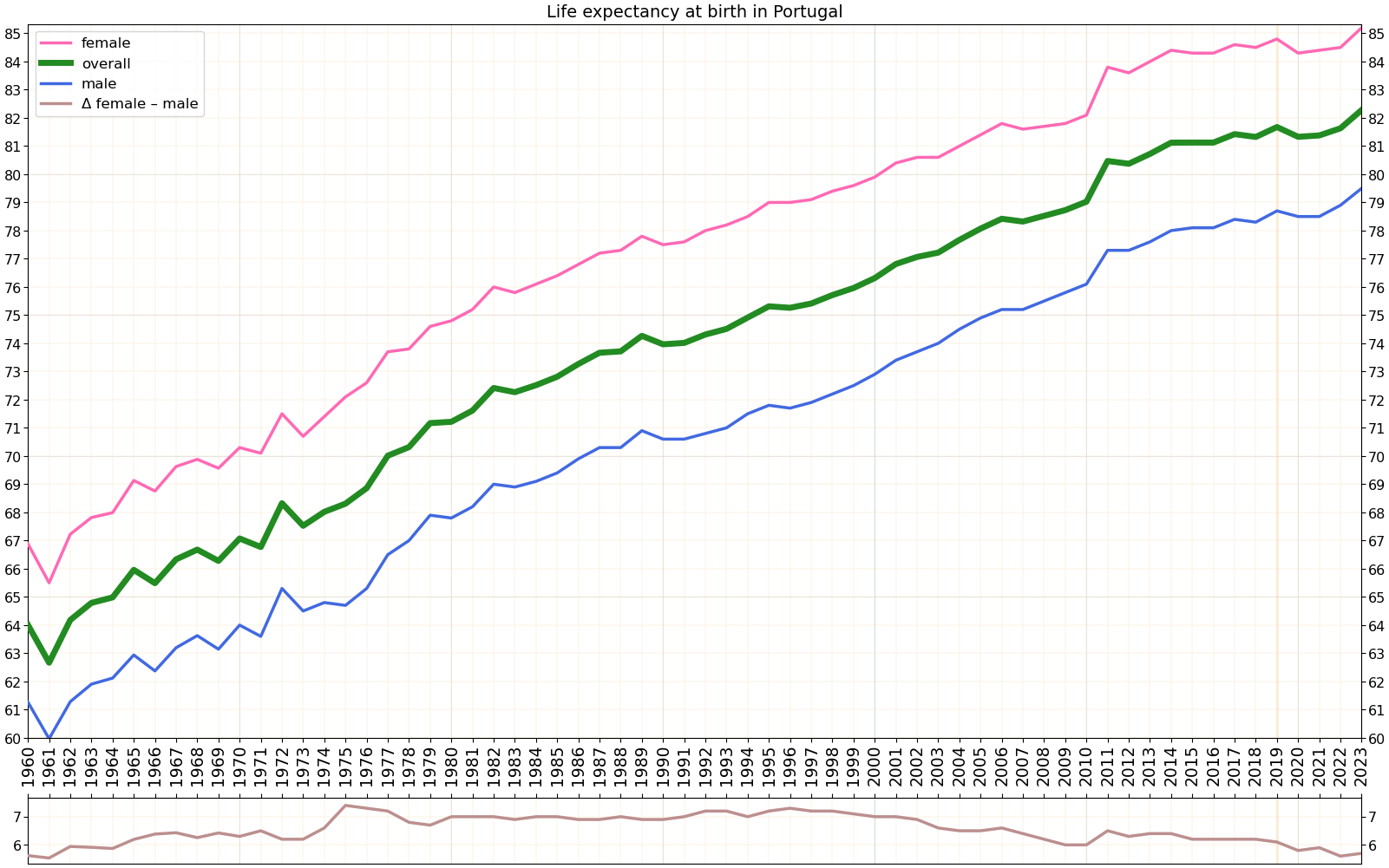
Life expectancy in Portugal since 1960 by gender

Dependency ratios
2022 official INE estimate:
- total dependency ratio: 58.4
- youth dependency ratio: 20.44
- elderly dependency ratio: 37.96
- potential support ratio: 2.63

Urbanization
urban population: 73.38% of total population (2020 official INE estimate)
rate of urbanization: 0.44% annual rate of change (2020-25 est.)

Sex ratio
2022 official INE estimate:
- at birth: 1.05 male(s)/female
- under 15 years: 1.05 male(s)/female
- 15–64 years: 0.96 male(s)/female
- 65 years and over: 0.76 male(s)/female
- total population: 0.90 male(s)/female

== Vital statistics ==
=== Vital statistics since 1890 ===
Notable events in Portuguese demographics:

- 1910 – 5 October 1910 revolution;
- 1914–1919 – World War I;
- 1918–1920 – Spanish flu
- 1961–1974 – Portuguese Colonial War and massive emigration of thousands of Portuguese citizens;
- 1974–1976 – Arrival of nearly 600,000 Portuguese citizens, called Returnees, from African colonies;
- 2010–2014 – Portuguese financial crisis and bailout, with a surge in emigration of young population;
- 2020–present – Big population increase due to wave of immigrants;

	Average population (31 December)	Live births	Deaths	Natural change	Crude birth rate (per 1000)	Crude death rate (per 1000)	Natural change (per 1000)	Crude migration change (per 1000)	Total fertility rates (Note: In fertility rates, 2.1 and above is a stable population and has been marked blue, 2 and below leads to an aging population and the result is that the population decreases.)
1886	4,878,000	142,456	98,143	44,313	29.2	20.1	9.1		
1887	4,920,000	153,104	100,274	52,830	31.1	20.4	10.7		
1888	4,963,000	150,992	98,369	52,623	30.4	19.8	10.6		
1889	5,006,000	154,639	102,365	52,004	30.9	20.5	10.4		
1890	5,050,000	164,630	127,260	37,370	32.6	25.2	7.4		4.24
1891	5,070,000	162,240	115,596	46,644	32.0	22.8	9.2	-3.4	4.16
1892	5,110,000	159,432	103,733	55,699	31.2	20.3	10.9	-1.3	4.06
1893	5,150,000	164,285	110,210	54,075	31.9	21.4	10.5	3.1	4.15
1894	5,180,000	153,846	107,226	46,620	29.7	20.7	9.0	-4.7	3.86
1895	5,220,000	156,600	108,576	48,024	30.0	20.8	9.2	-1.3	3.90
1896	5,260,000	157,800	119,402	38,398	30.0	22.7	7.3	-1.5	3.90
1897	5,300,000	161,120	116,070	45,050	30.4	21.9	8.5	0.3	3.95
1898	5,330,000	161,966	114,062	47,904	30.2	21.4	8.8	-2.8	3.93
1899	5,370,000	160,563	108,474	52,089	29.9	20.2	9.7	-1.5	3.89
1900	5,423,000	165,245	110,330	54,915	30.5	20.3	10.2	-2.8	3.96
1901	5,460,000	170,773	114,130	56,643	31.3	20.9	10.4	-1.2	4.07
1902	5,490,000	176,029	108,378	67,651	32.0	19.7	12.4	-6.9	4.16
1903	5,560,000	183,138	111,685	71,453	33.0	20.1	12.9	-0.1	4.29
1904	5,600,000	176,726	105,572	71,154	31.6	18.9	12.7	-5.5	4.11
1905	5,660,000	179,746	112,756	66,990	31.8	20.0	11.8	-1.1	4.13
1906	5,690,000	182,920	125,243	57,677	32.1	22.0	10.1	-4.8	4.17
1907	5,730,000	176,417	113,254	63,163	30.7	19.7	11.0	-4.0	3.99
1908	5,790,000	175,268	115,876	59,392	30.3	20.0	10.2	0.3	3.94
1909	5,850,000	174,753	112,421	62,332	29.9	19.2	10.8	-0.3	3.89
1910	5,890,000	186,953	113,161	73,792	31.7	19.2	12.5	-5.7	4.12
1911	5,960,000	230,033	130,900	99,133	38.6	22.0	16.6	-4.7	5.02
1912	5,960,000	207,870	119,578	88,292	34.9	20.1	14.8	-14.8	4.54
1913	5,970,000	193,906	123,054	70,852	32.5	20.6	11.9	-10.2	4.22
1914	5,980,000	188,479	115,526	72,953	31.5	19.3	12.0	-10.3	4.09
1915	5,990,000	195,225	122,513	72,712	32.6	20.5	12.0	-10.3	4.24
1916	6,000,000	192,780	129,389	63,391	32.1	21.6	10.7	-9.0	4.17
1917	6,000,000	188,391	134,082	54,309	31.4	22.3	9.1	-9.1	4.08
1918	6,020,000	178,687	248,978	-70,291	29.7	41.4	-11.6	14.9	3.86
1919	6,020,000	166,162	152,856	13,306	27.6	25.4	2.2	-2.2	3.59
1920	6,032,000	202,908	142,862	60,046	33.6	23.7	9.9	-6.6	4.37
1921	6,079,000	197,022	126,316	70,706	32.4	20.8	11.7	-6.7	4.21
1922	6,159,000	203,727	125,747	77,980	33.1	20.4	12.6	3.9	4.3
1923	6,238,000	207,172	141,775	65,397	33.2	22.7	10.5	0.8	4.32
1924	6,317,000	207,440	126,052	81,388	32.8	20.0	12.8	-1.6	4.26
1925	6,396,000	208,434	117,413	91,021	32.6	18.4	14.3	-4.8	4.24
1926	6,476,000	214,633	127,959	86,674	33.5	19.8	13.4	2.3	4.36
1927	6,555,000	199,399	123,382	76,017	31.0	18.8	11.6	0.8	4.03
1928	6,634,000	211,314	124,088	87,226	31.9	18.7	13.2	-2.5	4.15
1929	6,714,000	200,874	118,824	82,050	29.9	17.7	12.2	2.9	3.89
1930	6,804,000	202,529	116,352	86,177	29.7	17.1	12.7	-0.2	3.86
1931	6,878,000	204,120	115,225	88,895	29.7	16.8	13.0	-4.8	3.86
1932	6,968,000	208,062	118,895	89,167	29.9	17.1	12.8	2.9	3.89
1933	7,057,000	204,315	120,996	83,319	28.9	17.2	11.8	1.0	3.88
1934	7,147,000	203,158	118,539	84,619	28.4	16.6	11.8	1.0	3.74
1935	7,237,000	203,943	123,051	80,892	28.2	17.0	11.2	1.4	3.59
1936	7,326,000	205,615	119,003	86,612	28.1	16.2	11.8	0.5	3.45
1937	7,416,000	198,217	117,291	80,926	26.7	15.8	10.9	1.4	3.39
1938	7,506,000	199,467	115,331	84,136	26.6	15.4	11.2	0.9	3.34
1939	7,595,000	198,888	116,075	82,813	26.2	15.3	10.9	1.0	3.28
1940	7,696,000	187,892	120,486	67,406	24.4	15.7	8.8	4.5	3.22
1941	7,758,000	184,336	134,937	49,399	23.8	17.4	6.4	0.6	3.12
1942	7,830,000	187,503	126,531	60,972	24.0	16.1	7.8	-0.1	3.14
1943	7,902,000	198,101	121,887	76,214	25.1	15.3	9.7	0.5	3.27
1944	7,974,000	201,373	119,275	82,098	25.3	14.8	10.3	-1.4	3.28
1945	8,046,000	209,131	115,596	93,535	26.0	14.2	11.6	-1.5	3.39
1946	8,118,000	205,825	120,800	85,025	25.4	14.9	10.5	-3.0	3.29
1947	8,190,000	200,488	110,437	90,051	24.5	13.5	11.0	-1.1	3.14
1948	8,262,000	220,981	107,576	113,405	26.7	13.0	13.7	-3.7	3.42
1949	8,333,000	212,260	117,499	94,761	25.5	14.1	11.4	-2.8	3.23
1950	8,405,000	205,163	102,798	102,365	24.4	12.2	12.2	-3.6	3.1
1951	8,459,000	207,870	105,473	102,397	24.6	12.5	12.1	-5.7	3.1
1952	8,496,000	211,213	100,486	110,727	24.9	11.8	13.0	-8.6	3.1
1953	8,534,000	202,135	97,460	104,675	23.7	11.4	12.3	-7.8	3.1
1954	8,570,000	197,536	95,088	102,448	23.0	11.1	12.0	-7.8	3.1
1955	8,610,000	209,790	99,472	110,318	24.4	11.6	12.8	-8.1	3.1
1956	8,647,000	202,667	106,919	95,748	23.4	12.4	11.1	-6.8	3.11
1957	8,680,000	211,494	101,784	109,710	24.4	11.7	12.6	-8.8	3.12
1958	8,725,000	212,467	91,891	120,576	24.4	10.5	13.8	-8.6	3.13
1959	8,826,000	213,062	97,754	115,308	24.3	11.1	13.1	-1.5	3.15
1960	8,865,000	213,895	95,009	118,886	23.9	10.6	13.3	8.9	3.16
1961	8,929,000	217,516	99,590	117,926	24.3	11.1	13.2	-6.0	3.18
1962	8,994,000	220,200	96,864	123,336	24.4	10.7	13.7	-6.4	3.18
1963	9,031,000	212,152	98,011	114,141	23.4	10.8	12.6	-8.5	3.19
1964	9,034,000	217,136	96,878	120,258	23.8	10.6	13.2	-12.9	3.19
1965	8,999,000	210,299	95,187	115,112	23.0	10.4	12.6	-16.5	3.18
1966	8,931,000	206,940	100,088	106,852	22.7	11.0	12	-19.6	3.16
1967	8,875,000	202,061	95,816	106,245	22.2	10.5	11.7	-18.0	3.13
1968	8,837,000	194,962	94,661	100,301	21.4	10.4	11.0	-15.3	3.09
1969	8,758,000	189,739	101,088	88,651	20.9	11.1	9.7	-18.6	3.05
1970	8,663,252	180,690	92,854	87,836	20.9	10.7	10.1	-20.9	2.99
1971	8,624,258	181,243	98,355	82,888	21.0	11.4	9.6	-14.1	2.99
1972	8,636,603	174,685	90,025	84,660	20.2	10.4	9.8	-8.4	2.85
1973	8,629,598	172,324	95,239	77,085	20.0	11.0	8.9	-9.7	2.76
1974	8,879,127	171,979	96,837	75,142	19.4	10.9	8.5	20.2	2.69
1975	9,307,815	179,648	97,750	81,898	19.3	10.5	8.8	39.5	2.75
1976	9,403,809	186,712	101,843	84,869	19.9	10.8	9.0	1.3	2.81
1977	9,507,536	181,064	95,917	85,147	19.0	10.1	9.0	2.0	2.68
1978	9,608,959	167,467	96,042	71,425	17.4	10.0	7.4	3.3	2.45
1979	9,713,570	160,311	92,566	67,745	16.5	9.5	7.0	3.9	2.31
1980	9,818,980	158,309	94,794	63,515	16.1	9.7	6.5	4.4	2.25
1981	9,883,670	152,071	95,728	56,343	15.4	9.7	5.7	0.9	2.13
1982	9,939,871	151,002	92,379	58,623	15.2	9.3	5.9	-0.2	2.08
1983	9,975,859	144,296	96,179	48,117	14.5	9.6	4.8	-1.2	1.96
1984	10,016,605	142,783	96,975	45,808	14.3	9.7	4.6	-0.5	1.91
1985	10,030,621	130,450	97,085	33,365	13.0	9.7	3.3	-1.9	1.73
1986	10,034,846	126,715	95,521	31,194	12.6	9.5	3.1	-2.7	1.67
1987	10,025,215	123,179	95,102	28,077	12.3	9.5	2.8	-3.8	1.63
1988	10,014,005	122,093	97,844	24,249	12.2	9.8	2.4	-3.5	1.62
1989	9,995,995	118,483	95,743	22,740	11.9	9.6	2.3	-4.1	1.58
1990	9,970,441	116,321	102,768	13,553	11.7	10.3	1.4	-4.0	1.57
1991	9,950,029	116,299	103,882	12,417	11.7	10.4	1.2	-3.2	1.56
1992	9,954,958	114,924	100,638	14,286	11.5	10.1	1.4	-0.9	1.54
1993	9,974,391	113,960	105,950	8,010	11.4	10.6	0.8	1.2	1.52
1994	10,008,659	109,227	99,232	9,995	10.9	9.9	1.0	2.4	1.45
1995	10,043,693	107,097	103,475	3,622	10.7	10.3	0.4	3.1	1.41
1996	10,084,196	110,261	106,881	3,380	10.9	10.6	0.3	3.7	1.45
1997	10,133,758	112,933	104,778	8,155	11.1	10.3	0.8	4.1	1.47
1998	10,186,634	113,384	106,198	7,186	11.1	10.4	0.7	4.5	1.48
1999	10,249,022	116,002	107,871	8,131	11.3	10.5	0.8	5.3	1.51
2000	10,330,774	120,008	105,364	14,644	11.6	10.2	1.4	6.6	1.55
2001	10,394,669	112,774	105,092	7,682	10.8	10.1	0.7	5.5	1.45
2002	10,444,592	114,383	106,258	8,125	11.0	10.2	0.8	4.0	1.47
2003	10,473,050	112,515	108,795	3,720	10.7	10.4	0.4	2.3	1.44
2004	10,494,672	109,298	102,012	7,286	10.4	9.7	0.7	1.4	1.41
2005	10,511,988	109,399	107,464	1,935	10.4	10.2	0.2	1.4	1.42
2006	10,532,588	105,449	101,990	3,459	10.0	9.7	0.3	1.7	1.38
2007	10,553,339	102,492	103,512	-1,020	9.7	9.8	-0.1	2.1	1.35
2008	10,563,014	104,594	104,280	314	9.9	9.9	0.0	0.8	1.40
2009	10,573,479	99,491	104,434	-4,943	9.4	9.9	-0.5	1.5	1.35
2010	10,572,721	101,381	105,954	-4,573	9.6	10.0	-0.4	0.3	1.39
2011	10,558,950	96,856	102,848	-5,992	9.2	9.8	-0.6	-0.7	1.35
2012	10,503,889	89,841	107,612	-17,771	8.6	10.3	-1.7	-3.5	1.29
2013	10,444,092	82,787	106,554	-23,767	7.9	10.2	-2.3	-3.4	1.21
2014	10,395,121	82,367	104,843	-22,476	7.9	10.1	-2.2	-2.5	1.23
2015	10,368,554	85,500	108,539	-23,039	8.3	10.5	-2.2	-0.4	1.31
2016	10,344,478	87,126	110,573	-23,447	8.5	10.7	-2.3	0	1.36
2017	10,335,770	86,154	109,758	-23,604	8.4	10.7	-2.3	1.4	1.38
2018	10,333,496	87,020	113,051	-26,031	8.5	11.0	-2.5	2.3	1.42
2019	10,375,395	86,579	111,843	-25,264	8.4	10.9	-2.4	6.5	1.43
2020	10,394,297	84,530	123,396	-38,866	8.2	11.9	-3.7	5.6	1.41
2021	10,599,117	79,582	124,841	-45,220	7.6	11.8	-4.2	23.7	1.30
2022	10,929,704	83,671	124,361	-40,690	7.8	11.6	-3.8	34.5	1.34
2023	11,204,347	85,699	118,344	-32,645	7.7	10.7	-3.0	27.8	1.32
2024	11,387,222	84,642	118,396	-33,754	7.5	10.5	-3.0	19.2	1.27
2025	11,424,031	87,764	121,817	-34,053	7.7	10.7	-3.0	6.2	1.30

Population pyramid based on the UN’s World Population Prospects 2024. Estimates through 2023 and medium-scenario projections starting from 2024.

=== Current vital statistics ===
Period	Live births	Deaths	Natural increase
January–September 2025	65,445	90,804	–25,359
January–September 2026	65,462	89,893	–24,431
Difference	▲ +17 (+0.03%)	▼ –911 (–1.0%)	▲ +928

==== Birthplace of mothers ====
According to Statistics Portugal, in the year 2025, 56,804 children (64.7%) were born to Portuguese-born mothers, while 30,960 (35.3%) were born to foreign-born mothers. Compared to the year 2015, this represents a significant decrease in children born to Portuguese-born mothers (71,462 or 83.6% in 2015) and, conversely, an increase in children born to foreign-born mothers (14,038 or 16.4%), despite the roughly similar overall number of live births (85,500 in 2015 and 87,764 in 2025).

View source data.

=== Structure of the population ===
Population by Sex and Age Group (Official Census 2021):

Age group	Male	Female	Total	%
Total	4 920 220	5 422 846	10 343 066	100.00
0–4	218 527	207 185	425 712	4.07
5–9	222 278	210 889	433 167	4.14
10–14	251 339	240 793	492 132	4.70
15–19	266 963	255 595	522 558	4.99
20–24	287 540	273 647	560 887	5.36
25–29	280 721	268 129	548 850	5.24
30–34	287 493	284 268	571 761	5.46
35–39	305 503	314 418	619 921	5.92
40–44	351 485	375 132	726 617	6.94
45–49	392 737	423 651	816 388	7.80
50–54	366 189	400 157	766 346	7.32
55–59	351 700	397 580	749 280	7.16
60–64	339 143	386 682	725 825	6.93
65–69	309 373	359 065	668 438	6.39
70–74	282 050	335 766	617 816	5.90
75–79	215 263	278 986	494 249	4.72
80–84	148 007	211 012	359 019	3.43
85+	125 800	242 600	368 400	3.52
Age group	Male	Female	Total	Percent
0–14	692 144	658 867	1 351 011	12.91
15–64	3 272 879	3 335 554	6 608 433	63.13
65+	1 036 788	1 386 851	2 507 922	23.96

Population by Sex and Age Group (Population Estimate 2025):

Age group	Male	Female	Total	%
Total	5 587 729	5 836 302	11 424 031	100.00
0–4	216 150	205 950	422 100	3.69
5–9	248 114	236 901	485 015	4.25
10–14	258 430	246 062	504 492	4.42
15–19	284 194	270 394	554 588	4.85
20–24	323 178	298 745	621 923	5.44
25–29	388 921	334 888	723 809	6.34
30–34	397 181	340 784	737 965	6.46
35–39	388 778	348 607	737 385	6.45
40–44	398 650	386 818	785 468	6.88
45–49	418 163	430 751	848 914	7.43
50–54	404 245	432 210	836 455	7.32
55–59	361 384	399 306	760 690	6.66
60–64	346 409	393 041	739 450	6.47
65–69	322 533	371 273	693 806	6.07
70–74	286 021	340 969	626 990	5.49
75–79	239 267	301 524	540 791	4.73
80–84	161 699	228 129	389 828	3.41
85–89	98 013	161 107	259 120	2.27
90–94	38 046	82 209	120 255	1.05
95–99	7 643	23 201	30 844	0.27
100+	710	3 433	4 143	0.04
Age group	Male	Female	Total	Percent
0–14	722 694	688 913	1 411 607	12.36
15–64	3 711 103	3 635 544	7 346 647	63.31
65+	1 153 932	1 511 845	2 665 777	23.33

=== Total fertility rate ===
==== By region ====
2024
Region	TFR
Norte	1.21
Algarve	1.64
Centro	1.31
Grande Lisboa	1.65
Península de Setúbal	1.69
Alentejo	1.50
Oeste e Vale do Tejo	1.42
Região Autónoma dos Açores	1.22
Região Autónoma da Madeira	1.25

==== Intermunicipal community ====
2024
Intermunicipal community	TFR
Alto Minho	1.29
Cávado	1.27
Ave	1.30
Porto	1.19
Alto Tâmega e Barroso	1.13
Tâmega e Sousa	1.15
Douro	1.07
Terras de Trás-os-Montes	1.07
Aveiro	1.26
Coimbra	1.33
Leiria	1.36
Viseu Dão Lafões	1.28
Beira Baixa	1.42
Beiras e Serra da Estrela	1.26
Lisbon	1.65
Península de Setúbal	1.69
Alentejo Litoral	1.64
Baixo Alentejo	1.60
Alto Alentejo	1.28
Alentejo Central	1.47
Oeste	1.39
Médio Tejo	1.42
Lezíria do Tejo	1.46

==== Total fertility rate from 1850 to 1899 ====
The total fertility rate is the number of children born per woman. It is based on fairly good data for the entire period. Sources: Our World In Data and Gapminder Foundation.

Years	1850	1851	1852	1853	1854	1855	1856	1857	1858	1859	1860
Total Fertility Rate in Portugal	4.5	4.47	4.44	4.41	4.38	4.35	4.33	4.3	4.27	4.24	4.21

Years	1861	1862	1863	1864	1865	1866	1867	1868	1869	1870
Total Fertility Rate in Portugal	4.18	4.15	4.12	4.09	4.1	4.11	4.12	4.14	4.15	4.16

Years	1871	1872	1873	1874	1875	1876	1877	1878	1879	1880
Total Fertility Rate in Portugal	4.17	4.18	4.19	4.2	4.21	4.22	4.23	4.24	4.23	4.22

Years	1881	1882	1883	1884	1885	1886	1887	1888	1889	1890
Total Fertility Rate in Portugal	4.91	4.19	4.18	4.17	4.16	4.15	4.38	4.3	4.38	4.24

Years	1891	1892	1893	1894	1895	1896	1897	1898	1899
Total Fertility Rate in Portugal	4.16	4.06	4.15	3.86	3.9	3.9	3.95	3.93	3.89

View source data.

== Employment and income ==
Unemployment, youth ages 15–24
total: 21.8%. Country comparison to the world: 5th
male: 21.2%
female: 22.4% (2024 est.)

== Urban organization ==
=== Maps ===
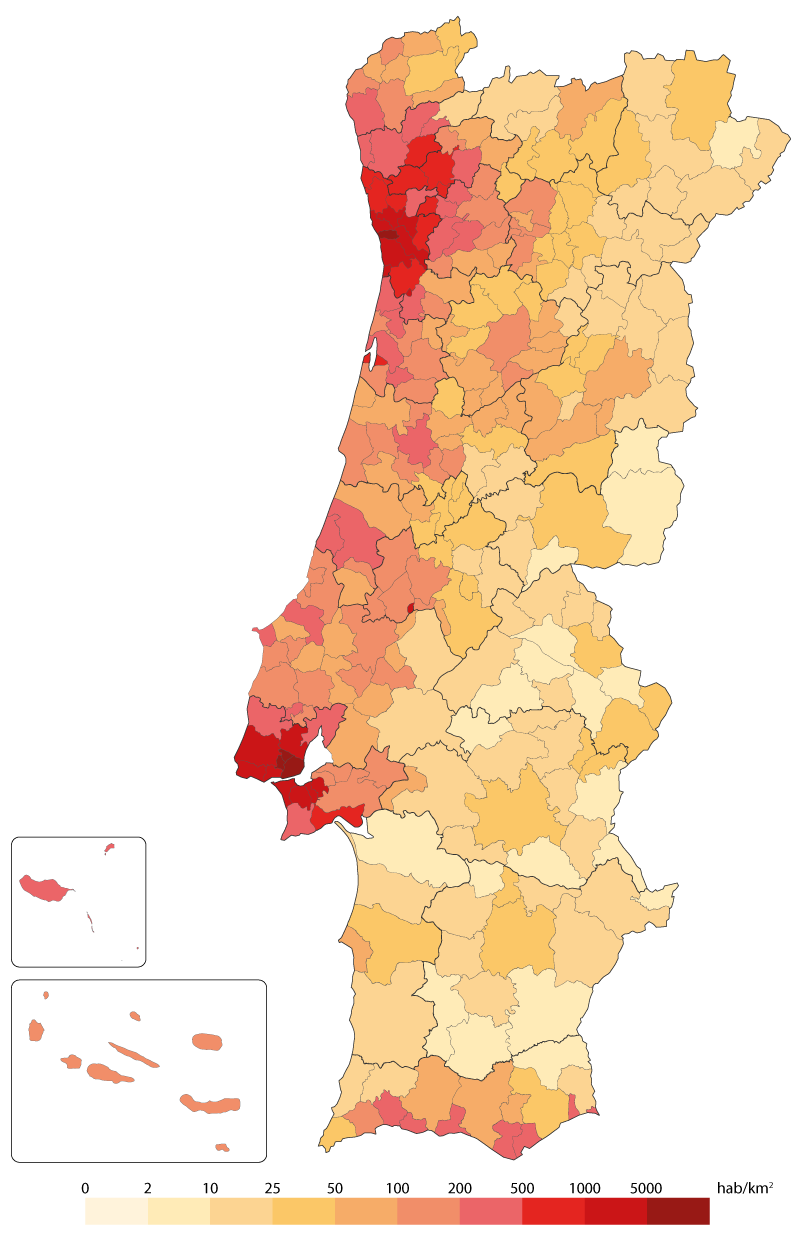
Population density by municipality in Portugal (2020).

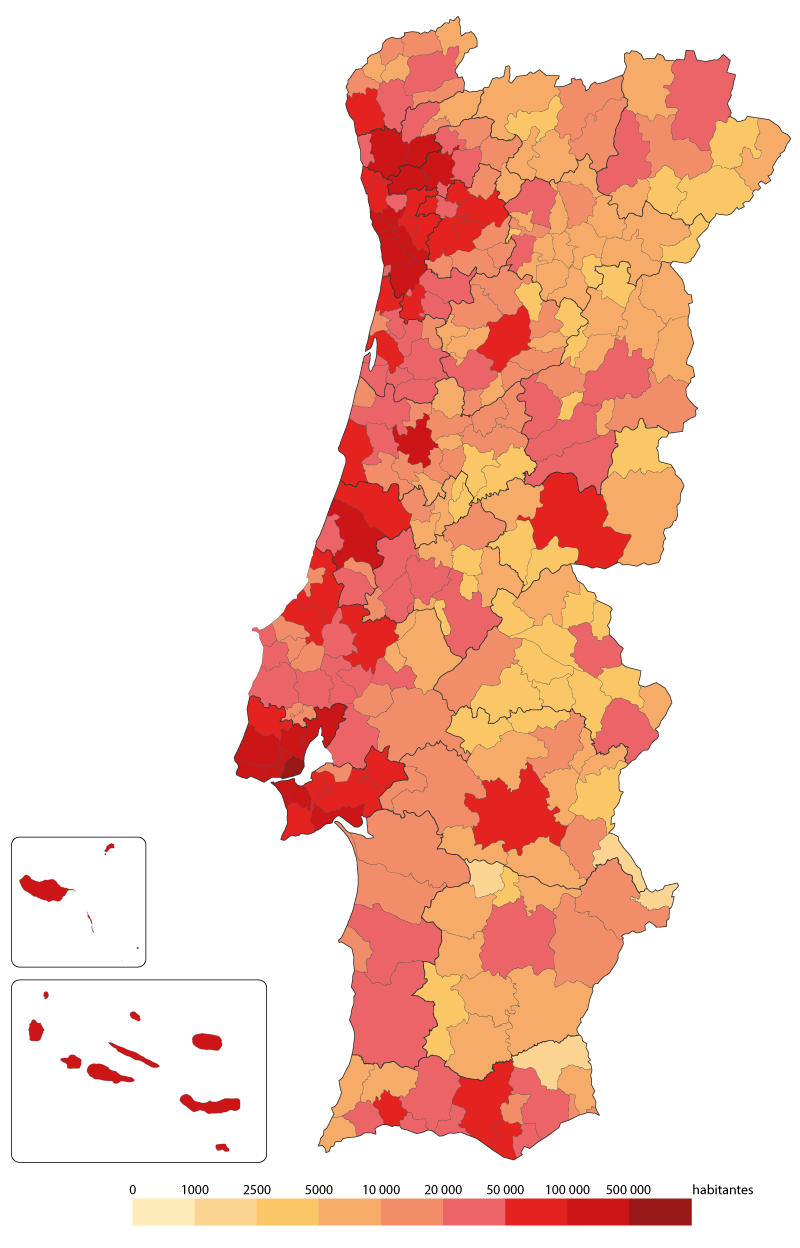
Population by municipality in Portugal (2020).

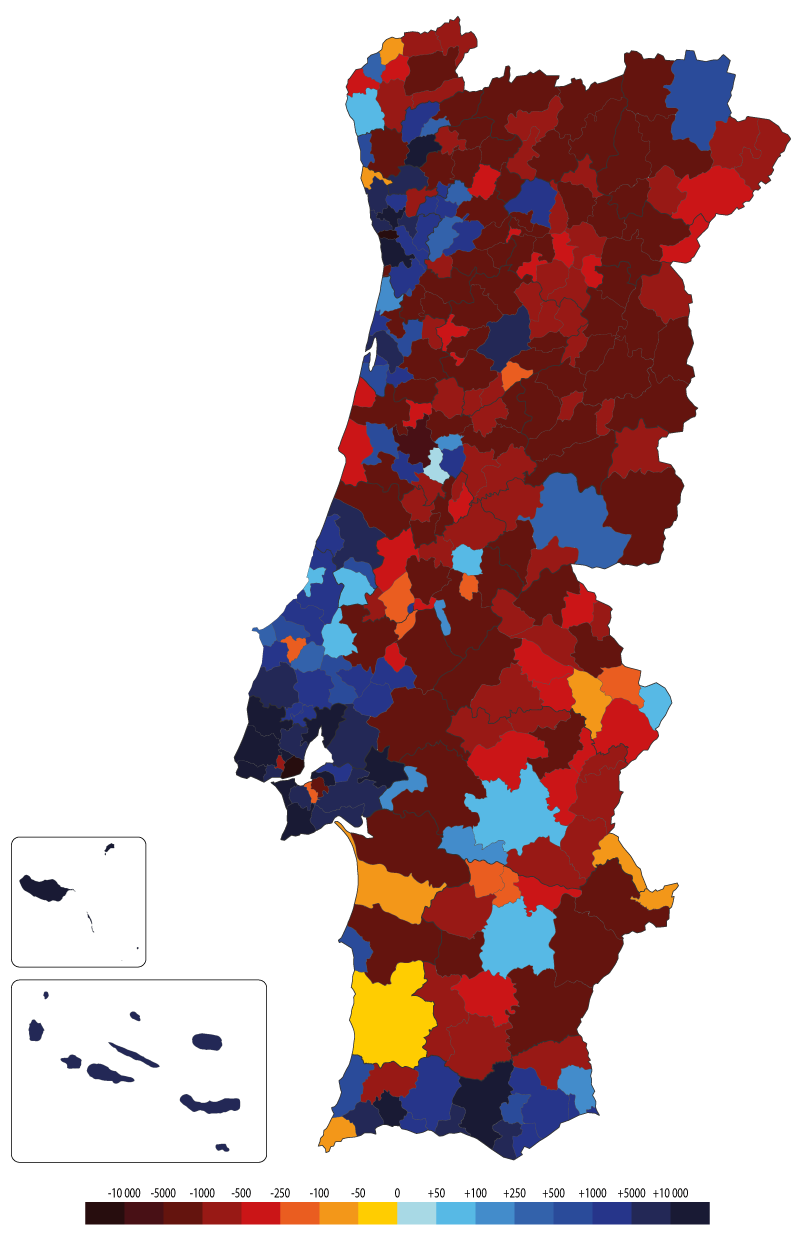
Population change by municipality in Portugal between 2001 and 2011.

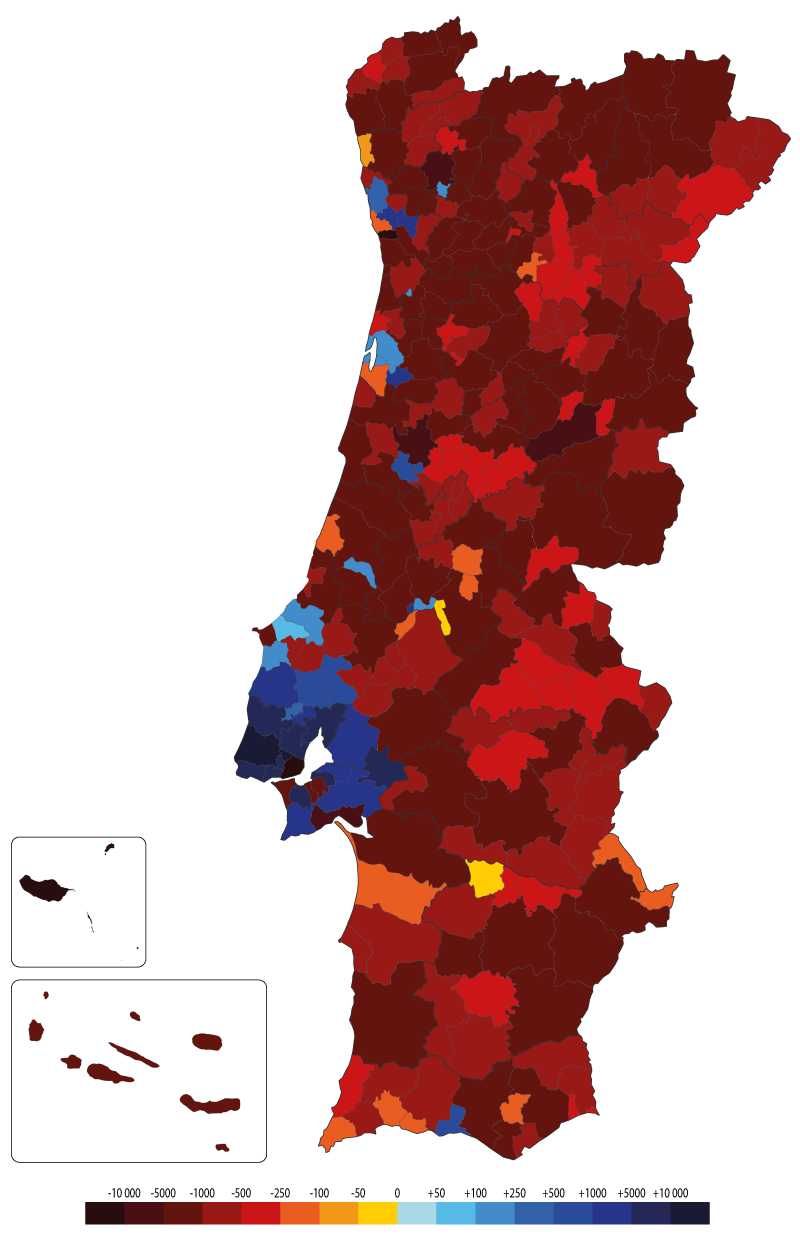
Population change by municipality in Portugal between 2011 and 2020.

=== Metropolitan areas and agglomerations ===
The 25 most and the 25 least populated municipalities of Portugal. The metropolitan areas of Lisbon, Porto and Minho are visible.

As of 2025, Portugal had two significant agglomerations: the political metropolitan areas of Lisbon and Porto – Grande Área Metropolitana de Lisboa (3.4 million) and Grande Área Metropolitana do Porto (1.9 million). Together they host 45.65% of the total population.

Image	City	Metropolitan area	Core municipality
	Lisbon	3,352,939	658,236
	Porto	1,861,727	273,476

=== Largest urban areas ===
When considering the number of inhabitants in consistent single urban areas, de facto cities in mainland Portugal, per the new with increased density of human-created structures, and excluding suburban and rural areas, Portugal has two cities with about one million inhabitants each (Lisbon and Porto), ten others with more than 50,000 inhabitants and 14 cities with populations between 20,000 and 40,000 inhabitants.

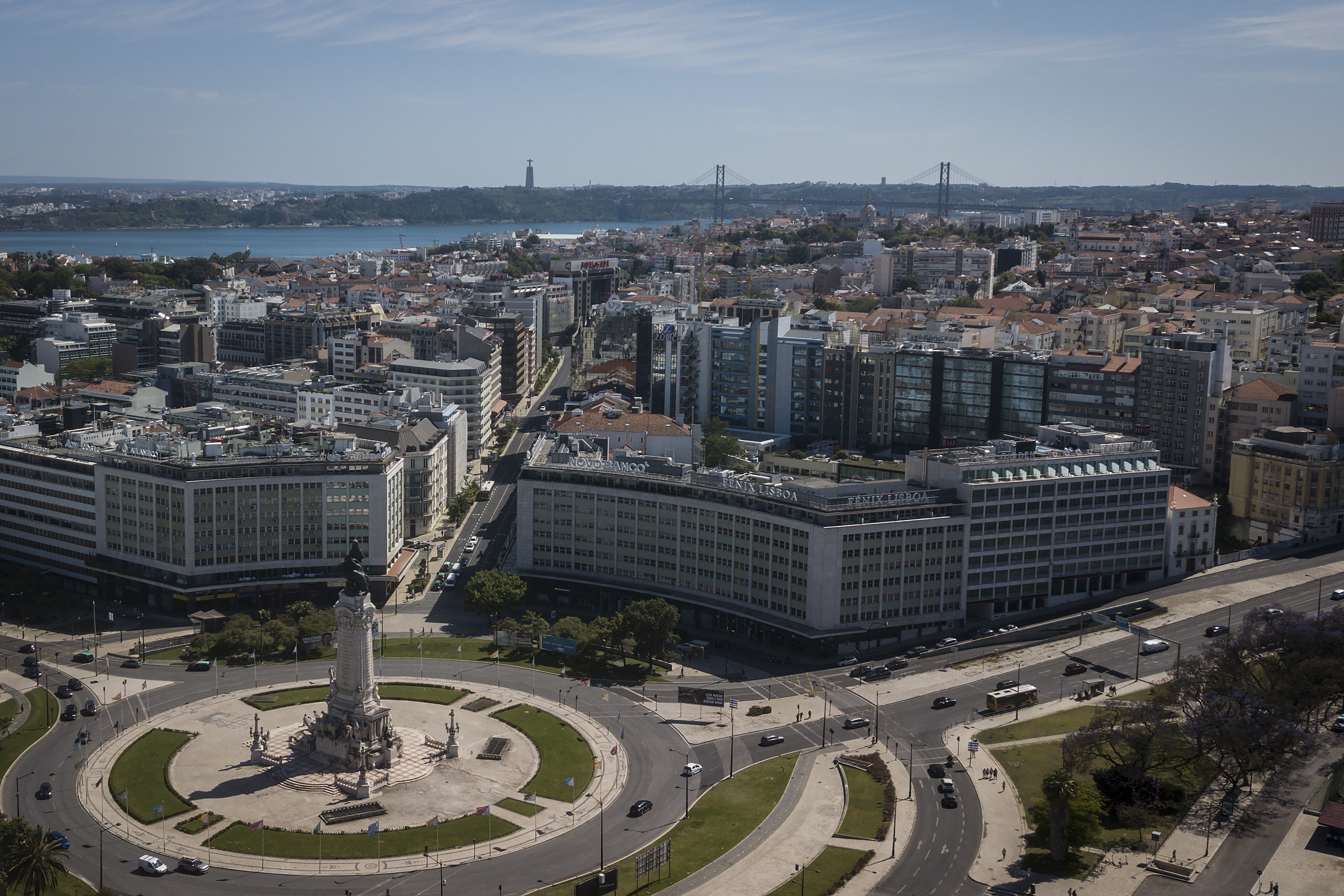
1.Lisbon and surroundings
3 million inh. ca.
Greater Lisbon

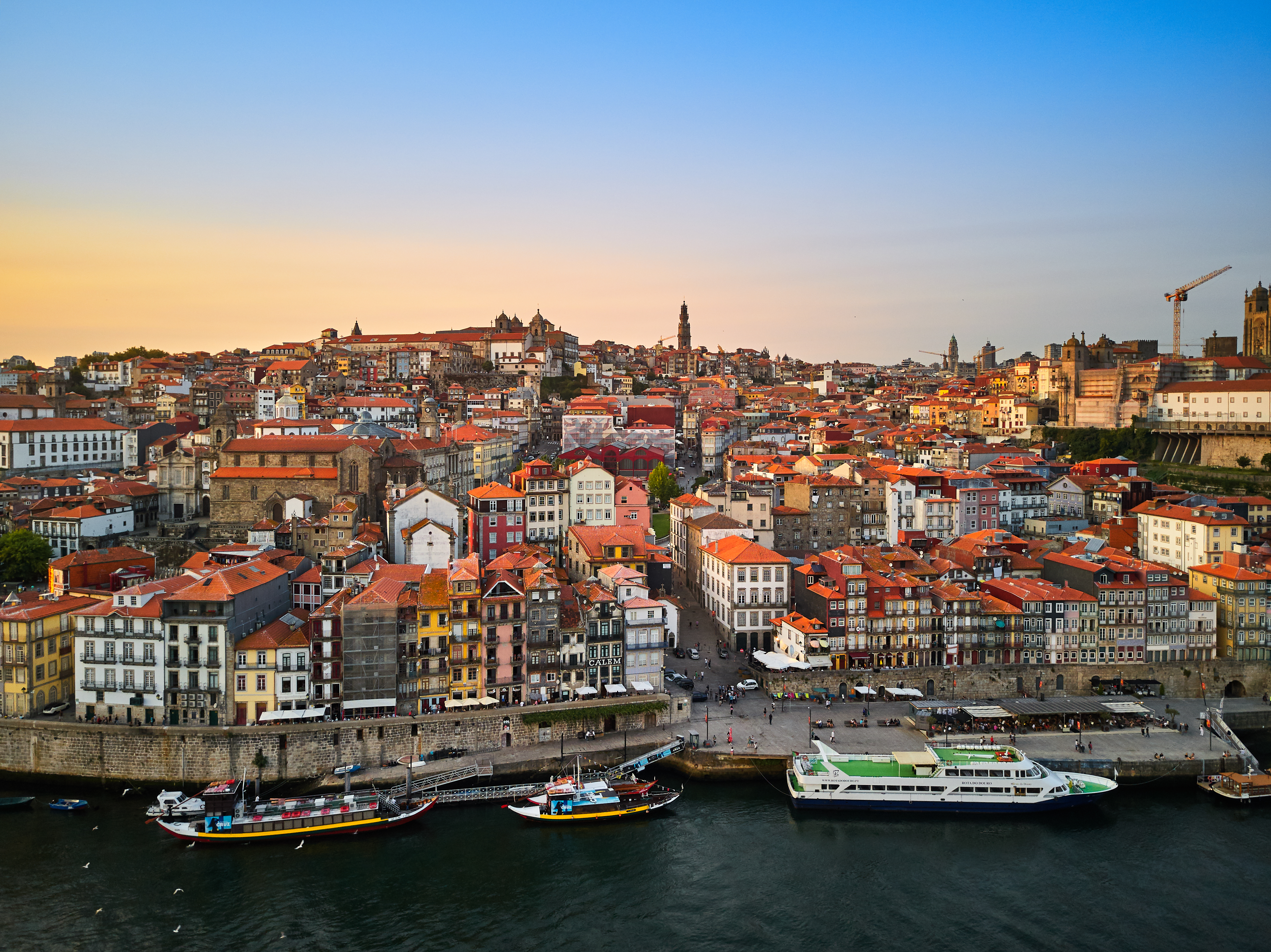
2.Porto and surroundings
2 million inh. ca.
Greater Porto

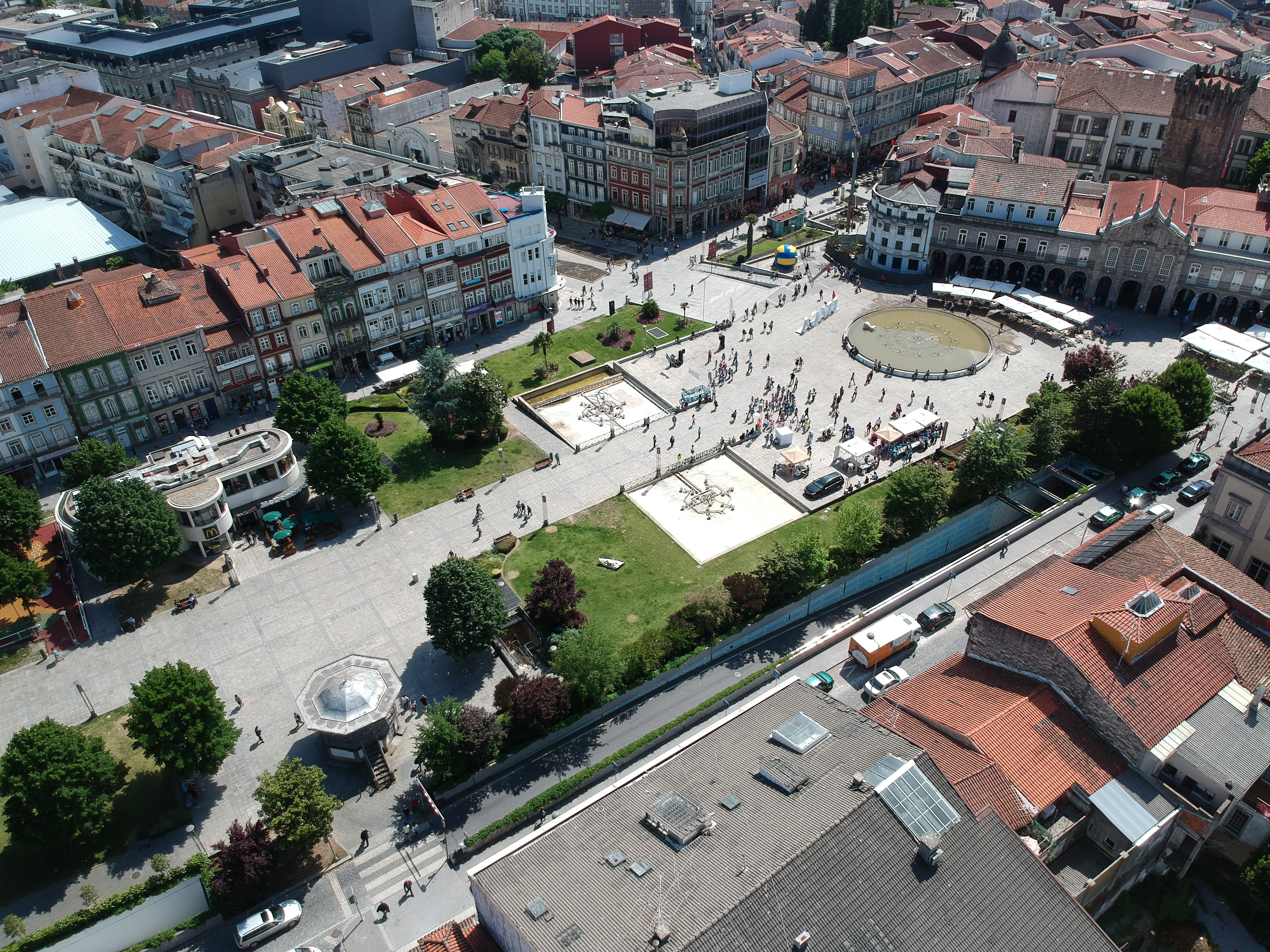
3.Braga
213,000 inh.

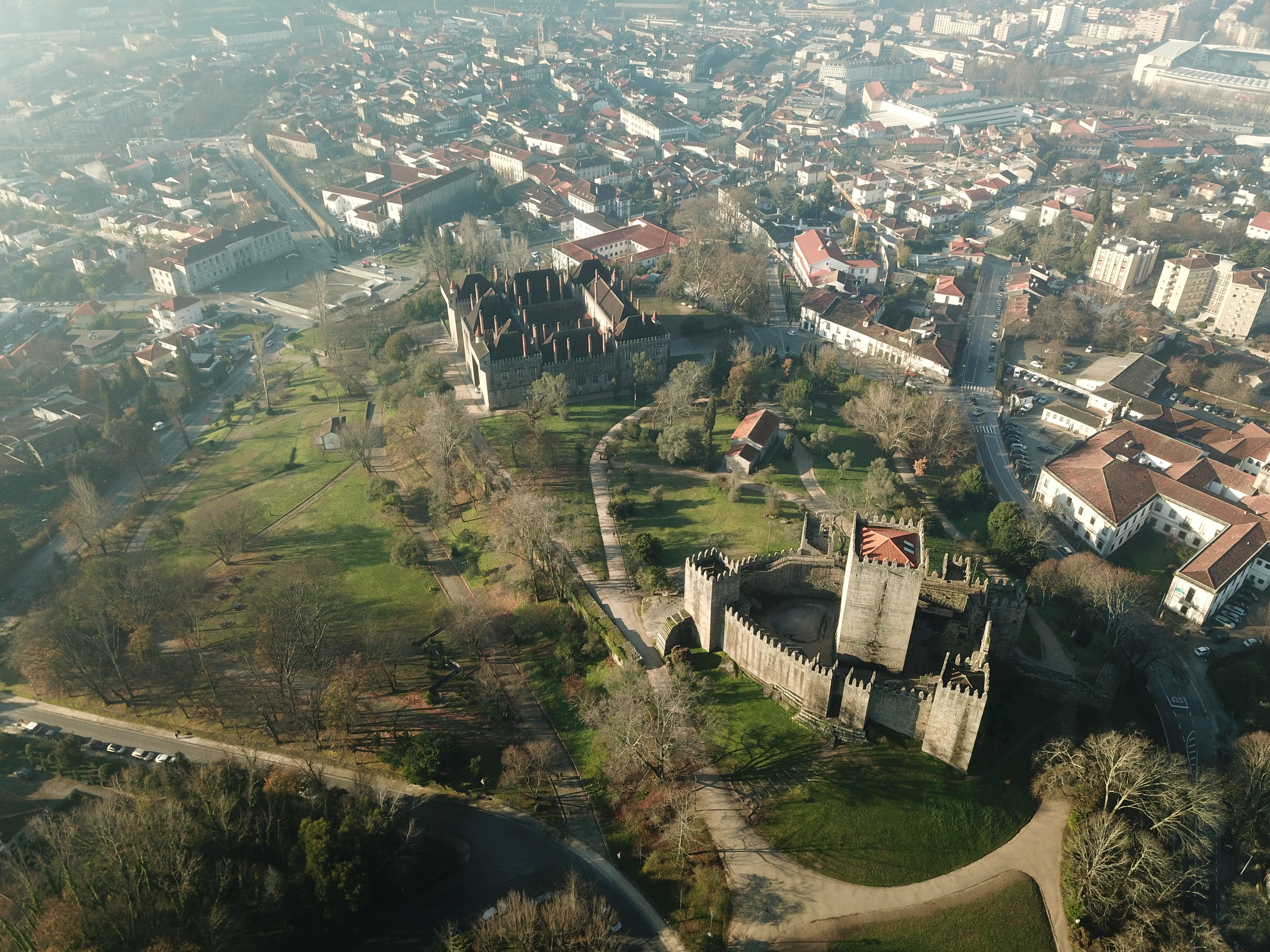
4.Guimarães
166,000 inh.

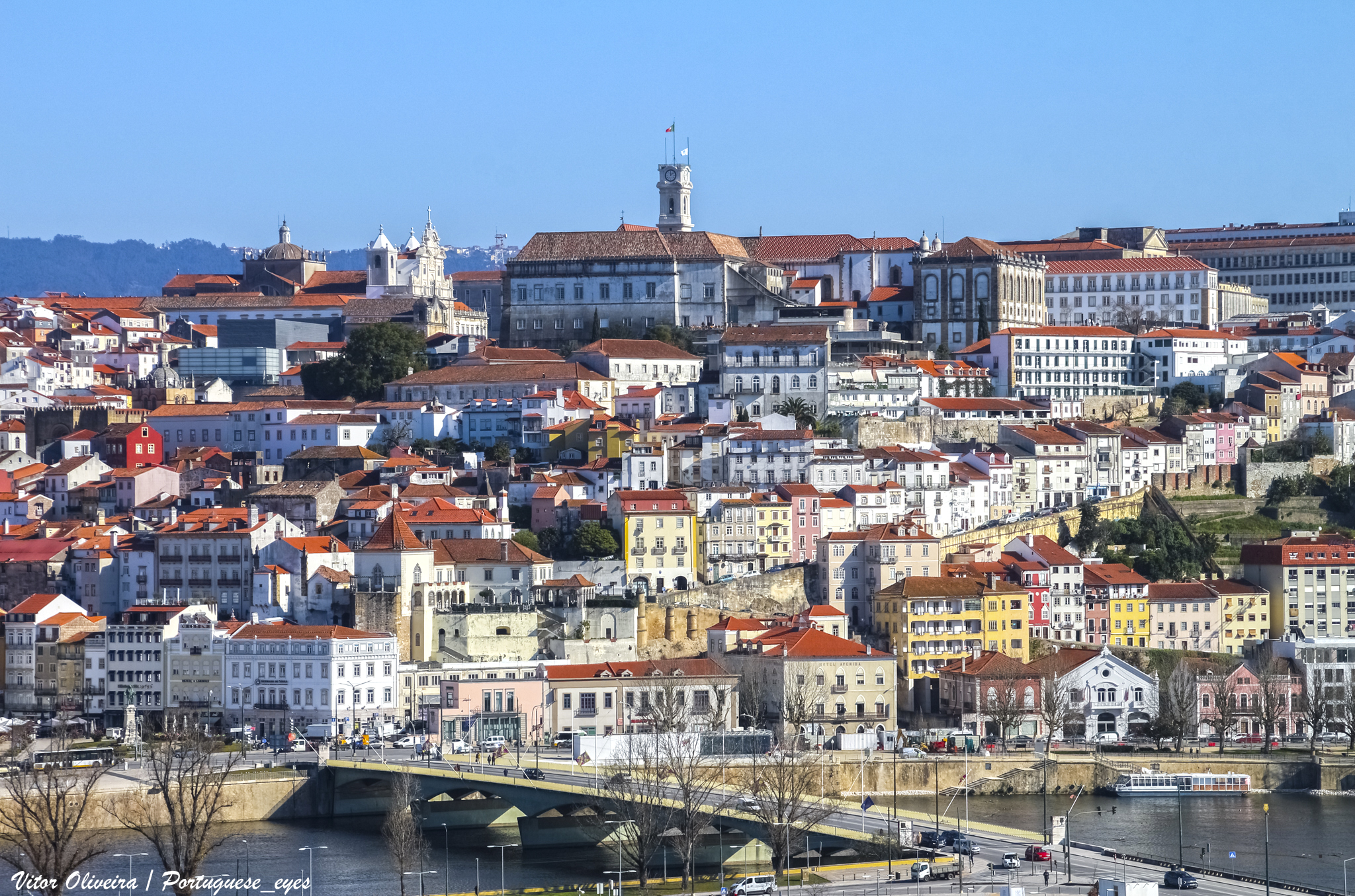
5.Coimbra
156,000 inh.

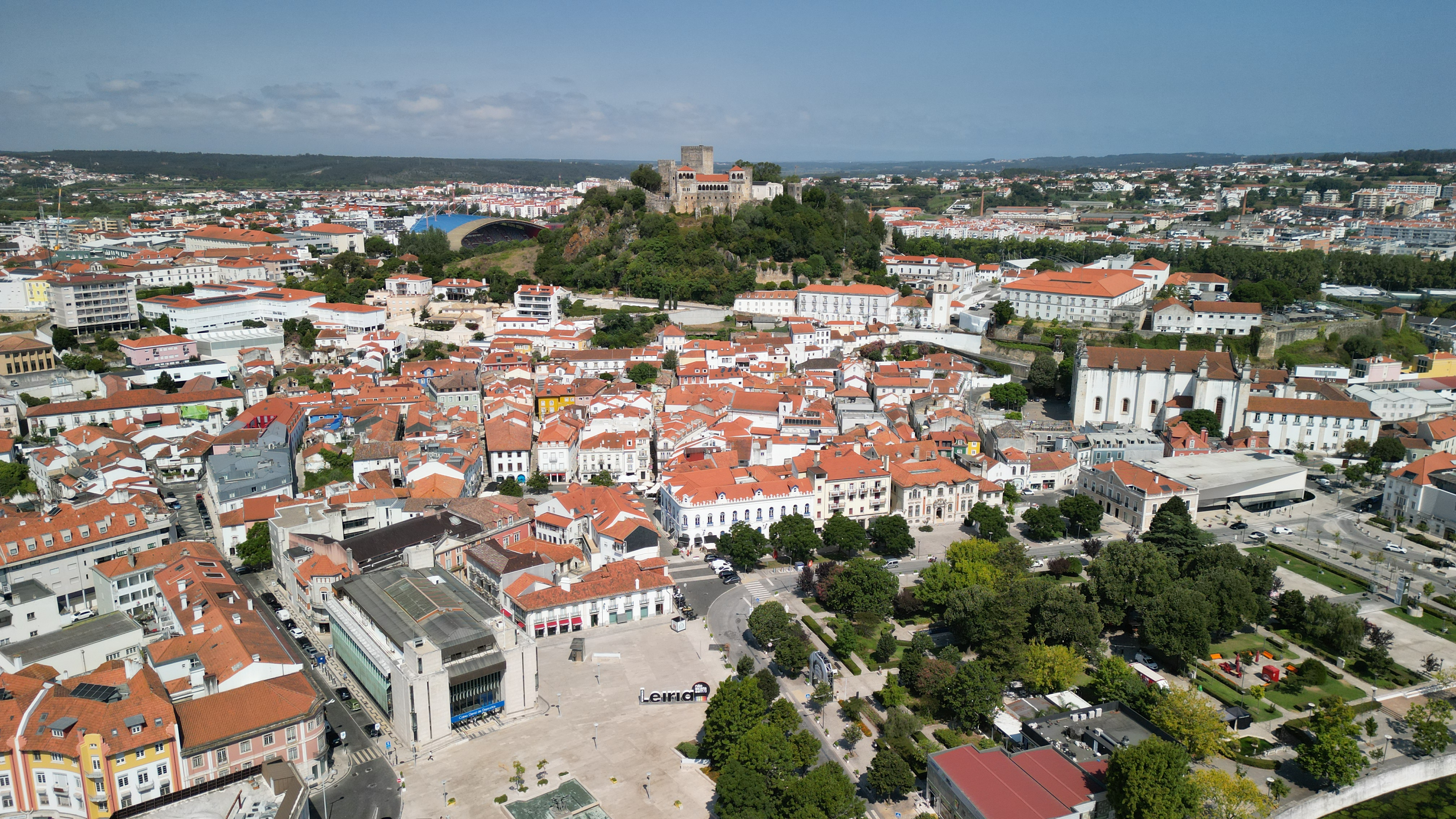
7. Leiria
146,000 inh.

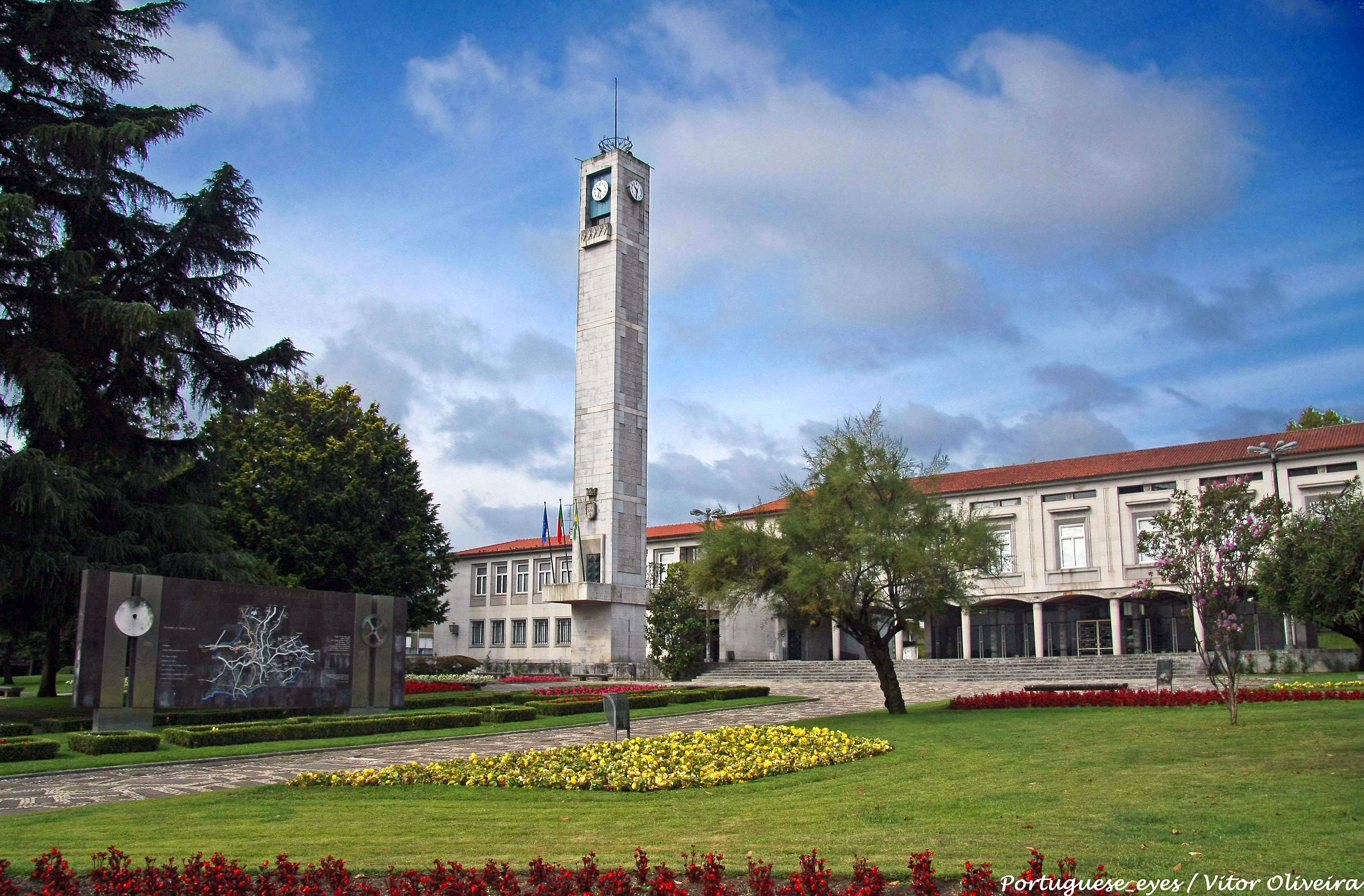
6. Vila Nova de Famalicão
144,000 inh.

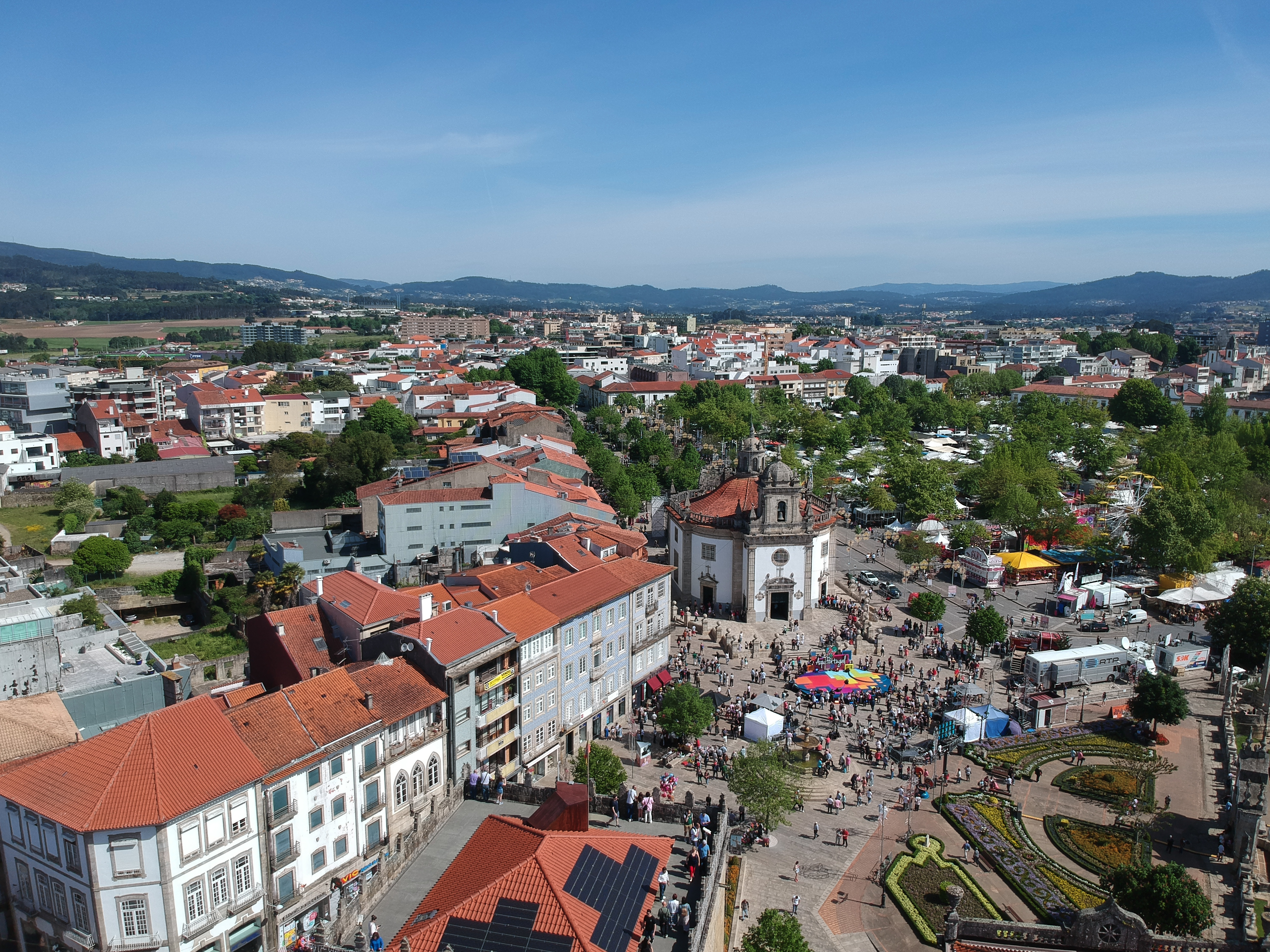
8. Barcelos
122,000 inh.

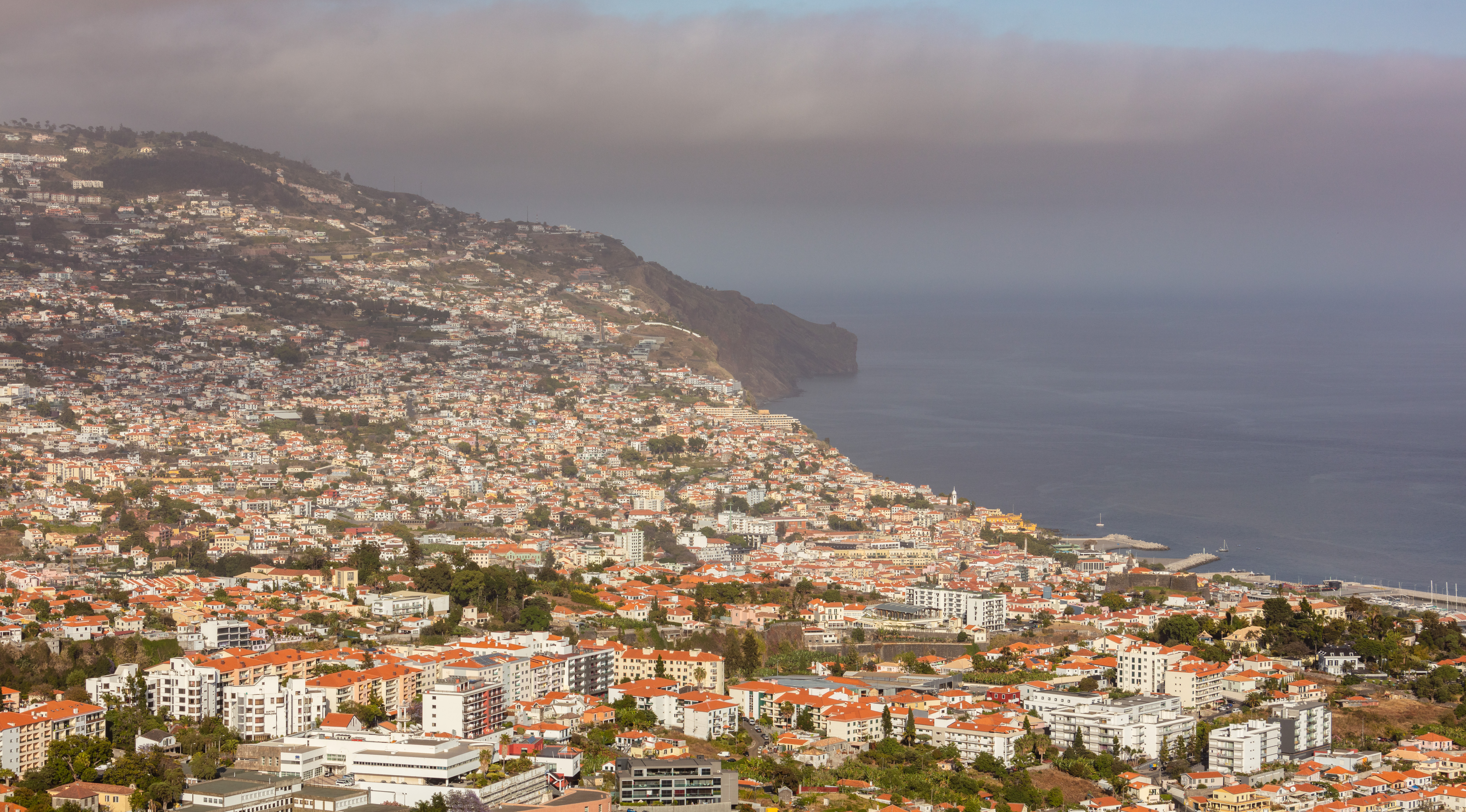
9.Funchal
113,000 inh.

10.Viseu
109,000 inh.

=== Largest cities ===
Portugal has 151 localities with national city status (cidade). Every city is included into a municipality (município). This is a list of population by city, which means that it refers to the number of inhabitants in the city proper, excluding inhabitants from the same municipality but living outside the urban area of the city in other civil parishes (freguesias) of the municipality. In some cases (e.g. Lisbon), the entire municipality and the city proper cover the same territory. Population numbers from the 2021 census.

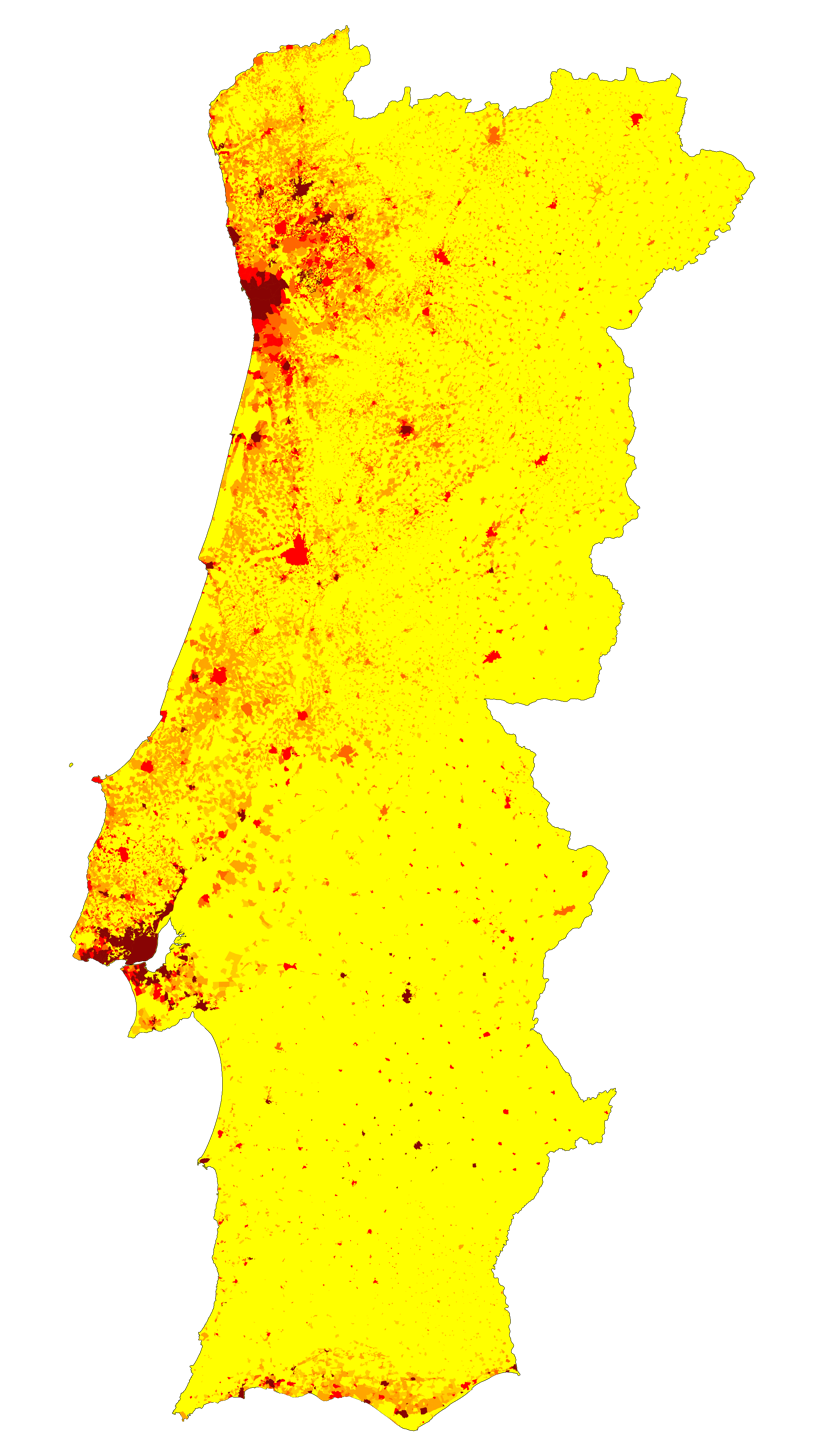
Population density of Portugal in 2021, per km^{2}: 0-49 50-99 100-499 500-999 1000-1999 2000+

Rank	City name	Population	Metropolitan area	Subregion
1	Lisbon	545,796	Greater Metropolitan Area of Lisbon	Grande Lisboa
2	Porto	231,800	Greater Metropolitan Area of Porto	Grande Porto
3	Vila Nova de Gaia	188,421	Greater Metropolitan Area of Porto	Grande Porto
4	Amadora	174,454	Greater Metropolitan Area of Lisbon	Grande Lisboa
5	Braga	146,543	Greater Metropolitan Area of Minho	Cávado
6	Coimbra	106,655	Greater Metropolitan Area of Coimbra	Baixo Mondego
7	Funchal	105,590		Madeira
8	Setúbal	98,470	Greater Metropolitan Area of Lisbon	Península de Setúbal
9	Almada	95,851	Greater Metropolitan Area of Lisbon	Península de Setúbal
10	Agualva-Cacém	81,006	Greater Metropolitan Area of Lisbon	Grande Lisboa
11	Queluz	73,047	Greater Metropolitan Area of Lisbon	Grande Lisboa
12	Rio Tinto	65,469	Greater Metropolitan Area of Porto	Grande Porto
13	Barreiro	62,860	Greater Metropolitan Area of Lisbon	Península de Setúbal
14	Aveiro	62,130		Baixo Vouga
15	Viseu	60,570		Dão-Lafões
16	Odivelas	58,170	Greater Metropolitan Area of Lisbon	Grande Lisboa
17	Guimarães	54,750		Ave
18	Leiria	54,540		Pinhal Litoral
19	Faro	49,360		Algarve
20	Matosinhos	49,034	Greater Metropolitan Area of Porto	Grande Porto
21	Loures	46,246	Greater Metropolitan Area of Lisbon	Grande Lisboa
22	Portimão	43,810		Algarve
23	Póvoa de Varzim	41,206	Greater Metropolitan Area of Porto	Grande Porto
24	Amora	41,140	Greater Metropolitan Area of Lisbon	Península de Setúbal
25	Maia	40,534	Greater Metropolitan Area of Porto	Grande Porto
26	Évora	40,373		Alentejo Central
27	Montijo	40,130	Greater Metropolitan Area of Lisbon	Península de Setúbal
28	Ponta Delgada	40,050		Açores
29	Santa Maria da Feira	39,576	Greater Metropolitan Area of Porto	Entre Douro e Vouga
30	Ermesinde	38,570	Greater Metropolitan Area of Porto	Grande Porto

=== Largest municipalities by population ===
The following table lists the largest Portuguese municipalities by population as of 2025. The land area is expressed in km^{2} and only municipalities with populations of over 100,000 inhabitants are listed. The 25 listed municipalities account for 46.09% of the country's population and for only 5.06% of its total land area.

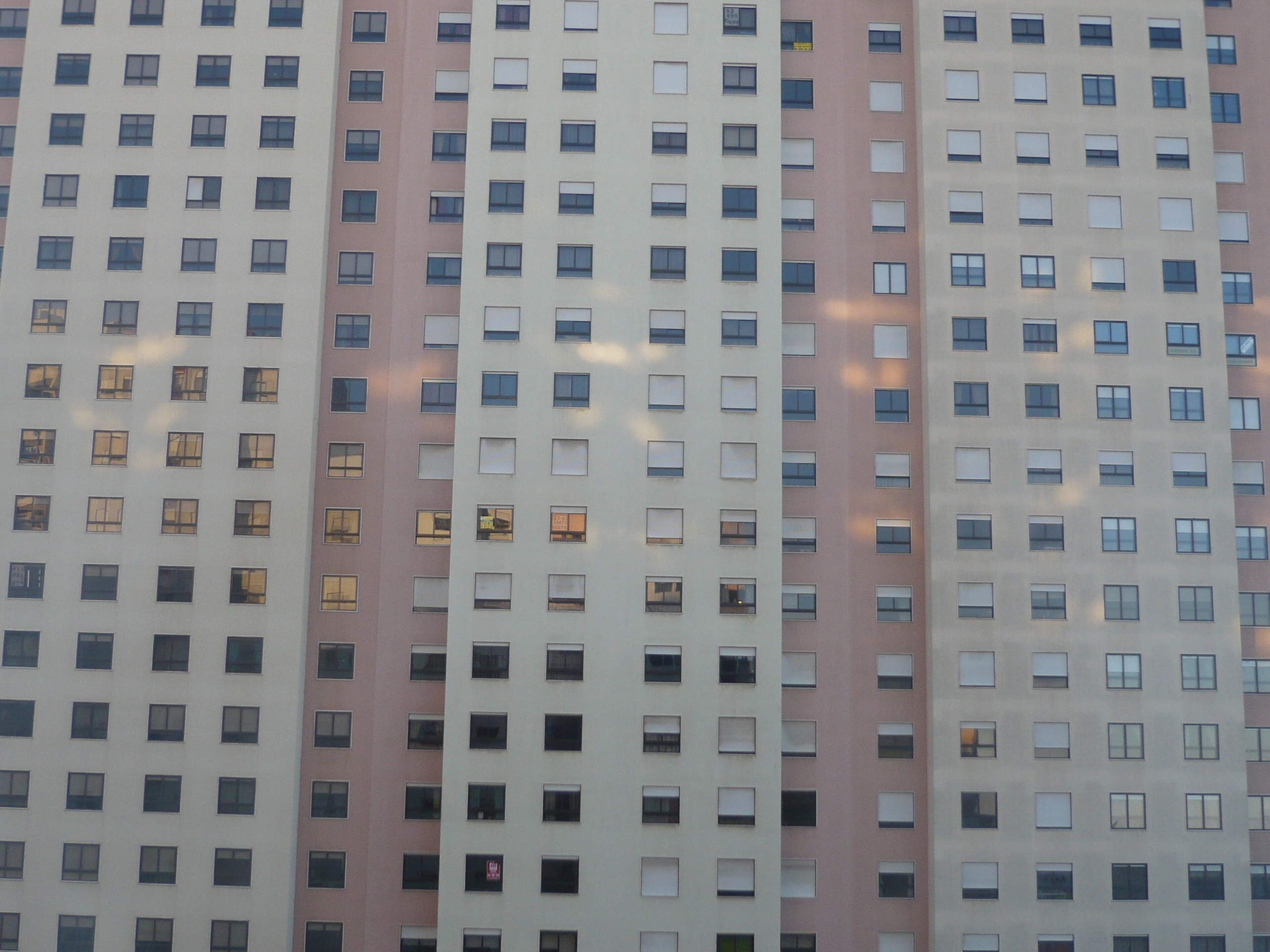
View of residential building in Amadora, one of the most densely populated municipalities in Portugal and more densely populated than Hong Kong

Rank	Municipality	Population	Land Area	Density	Metropolitan area
1	Lisbon	658,236	100.05	6,579.1	Greater Metropolitan Area of Lisbon
2	Sintra	449,956	319.23	1,409.5	Greater Metropolitan Area of Lisbon
3	Vila Nova de Gaia	323,202	168.46	1,918.6	Greater Metropolitan Area of Porto
4	Porto	273,476	41.42	6,602.5	Greater Metropolitan Area of Porto
5	Cascais	242,619	97.40	2,491.0	Greater Metropolitan Area of Lisbon
6	Loures	236,988	167.24	1,417.1	Greater Metropolitan Area of Lisbon
7	Braga	212,635	183.40	1,159.4	
8	Amadora	205,517	23.78	8,642.4	Greater Metropolitan Area of Lisbon
9	Almada	202,896	70.21	2,889.8	Greater Metropolitan Area of Lisbon
10	Seixal	198,254	95.50	2,076.0	Greater Metropolitan Area of Lisbon
11	Oeiras	188,056	45.88	4,098.9	Greater Metropolitan Area of Lisbon
12	Odivelas	185,736	26.54	6,998.3	Greater Metropolitan Area of Lisbon
13	Matosinhos	181,930	62.42	2,914.6	Greater Metropolitan Area of Porto
14	Gondomar	170,597	131.86	1,293.8	Greater Metropolitan Area of Porto
15	Guimarães	165,554	240.95	687.1	
16	Coimbra	156,359	319.40	489.5	
17	Vila Franca de Xira	152,007	318.19	477.7	Greater Metropolitan Area of Lisbon
18	Leiria	145,861	565.09	258.1	
19	Vila Nova de Famalicão	143,801	201.59	713.3	
20	Santa Maria da Feira	142,676	215.88	660.9	Greater Metropolitan Area of Porto
21	Maia	142,129	82.99	1,712.6	Greater Metropolitan Area of Porto
22	Setúbal	141,266	230.33	613.3	Greater Metropolitan Area of Lisbon
23	Barcelos	122,487	378.90	323.3	
24	Funchal	113,443	76.14	1,489.9	
25	Viseu	109,166	507.10	215.3	

== People ==
=== Nationality ===
noun: Portuguese (singular and plural)
adjective: Portuguese

=== Immigration ===
Portuguese and foreign born population pyramid in 2021

In 1992, 1.3% of the population was foreign, and by 2025 the number had grown to 13.9% or 1,585,854 people.

Since the independence of the former African colonies, Portugal saw a steady immigration from Africa, most notably Cape Verde, Angola and Guinea-Bissau, but also São Tomé and Príncipe, Mozambique and former Portuguese India in Asia.

Portugal saw migration waves due to labor shortages since 1999, first from Eastern Europe (1999–2002), in two distinctive groups, a Slav (Ukraine, Russia and Bulgaria) and an East Latin (Romania and Moldova), that stopped and started declining as the labour market became saturated.

Since 2003, most of the immigrants came from Brazil, China and the Indian subcontinent. Family reunification was seen as important for a successful integration in the country, thus the government eased it, and in 2006, more than 6 in 10 new immigrants were family members of legal foreign residents in the country.

There is also a significant number of elderly Western European residents in search of quality of life, namely from the United Kingdom, France, Germany, the Netherlands and Belgium. More recently, there is significant migration from the former Portuguese colony of Brazil, as since 2017 more than 30,000 Brazilians immigrate to Portugal annually.

Below is a summary table of the main foreign nationalities present in Portugal according to the latest AIMA data. As of 31 December 2025, there were 1,585,854 legally resident people in Portugal with foreign citizenship (13.88% of the population). These include both citizens born in Portugal with foreign citizenship and foreign immigrants. Descendants of immigrants are excluded (Portugal, like many European countries, does not collect data on ethnicity) and those who, regardless of place of birth or citizenship at birth, were Portuguese citizens (see also Portuguese nationality law). Among the latter are also naturalized citizens whose data are reported in the next table.

Foreigners in Portugal in 2025.

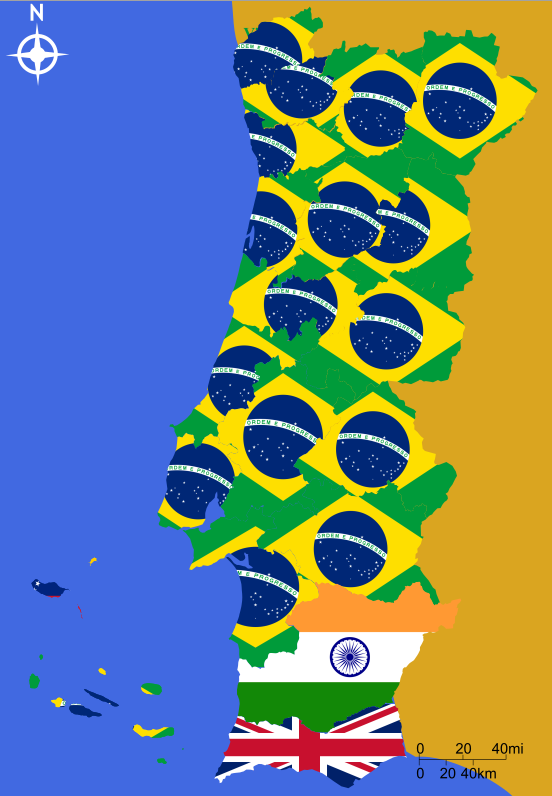
Biggest foreign nationality by district in 2022.

Largest groups of foreign residents as of 31.12.2025
Nationality	Population
Brazil	493,622
Angola	99,050
India	91,405
Ukraine	84,889
Cape Verde	71,005
Nepal	56,304
Bangladesh	55,579
Guinea-Bissau	51,935
United Kingdom	47,726
(European Union) Italy	42,418
Pakistan	42,042
São Tomé and Príncipe	41,800
(European Union) France	29,794
China	26,772
(European Union) Germany	26,715
(European Union) Spain	22,727
United States	21,293
Russia	20,509
(European Union) Romania	17,759
Venezuela	17,411
(European Union) Netherlands	16,154
Mozambique	15,316
Algeria	14,687
Morocco	13,477
Colombia	13,191
Other countries (below 10,000)	152,274

Below is a summary table of Portuguese citizenship acquisitions by foreigners residing in the country recorded between 2008 and 2023 for countries having recorded at least 1,000 naturalizations during the given timespan. During this period, 359,378 people (3.34% of the current Portuguese population) obtained Portuguese citizenship according to the latest Eurostat data. These people are not counted among foreigners (see above table) as they are Portuguese citizens in all respects.

Nationality	Acquisitions of Citizenship (2008–2023)
Brazil	95,186
Cape Verde	56,648
Ukraine	34,163
Guinea-Bissau	27,902
Angola	27,092
Moldova	19,346
São Tomé and Príncipe	15,521
India	12,917
Nepal	7,622
(European Union) Romania	7,164
Russia	5,652
Pakistan	5,627
Bangladesh	5,461
Other countries (below 5,000)	39,077

=== Net migration ===
Portugal Net migration by region
Year	Portugal	Mainland	Azores	Madeira
2011	-25,178	-22,661	-821	-1,696
2012	-37,290	-34,127	-955	-2,208
2013	-36,029	-32,739	-985	-2,305
2014	-26,495	-21,293	-2,066	-3,136
2015	-3,528	476	-1,573	-2,431
2016	-629	2,222	-1,400	-1,451
2017	14,896	16,695	-1,117	-682
2018	23,757	24,720	-1,094	131
2019	67,163	66,634	-575	1,104
2020	57,768	54,889	839	2,040
2021	250,079	243,986	3,733	2,360
2022	371,277	364,980	1,596	4,701
2023	307,288	300,560	1,657	5,071
2024	216,629	210,034	1,625	4,970
2025	70,862	66,855	1,450	2,557

=== Ethnic minorities and persons with disabilities ===
Portugal does not collect ethnicity or racial data of its population.

Anti-racism laws prohibit and penalize racial discrimination in housing, business, and health services.

Discrimination against persons with disabilities in employment, education, access to health care, or the provision of other state services is illegal. The law mandates access to public buildings and to newly built private buildings for such persons.

== Languages ==
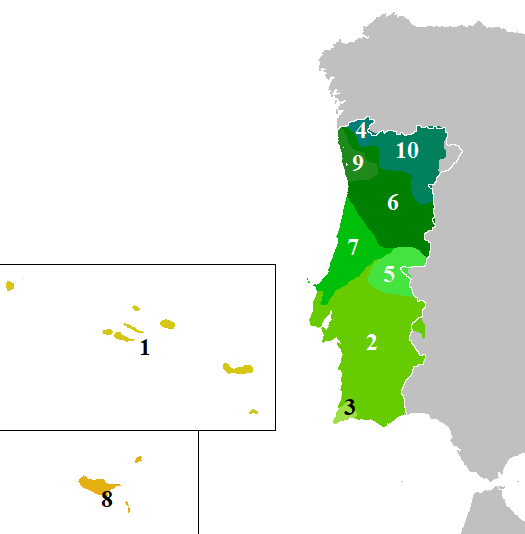
Map of Portuguese language dialects in Portugal.

The main language spoken as first language by the overwhelming majority of the population is Portuguese. Other autochthonous languages spoken include:

- Caló (see also Caló language), the language of the Portuguese-Romani community. There are about 52,000 Romani people in Portugal.
- Mirandês (see also Mirandese language), officially recognised as an official language. It enjoys special protection in the area of Miranda do Douro. As of today, there are about 15,000 people who speak the language (0.14%).
- Barranquenhu (see also Barranquenho), spoken in the town of Barrancos (in the border between Extremadura, Andalusia and Portugal). As of today, there are about 3,000 speakers of the language (0.03%).
- Minderico – a sociolect or argot spoken in Minde, practically extinct. There are about 150 speakers left
- Portuguese Sign Language, the official language for the deaf community in Portugal. There are about 30,000 deaf people (0.29%) in Portugal who use the language.

== Religion ==
Religion in Portugal (Census 2021)
1. Catholicism (80.2%)
2. Protestantism (2.10%)
3. Jehovah's Witnesses (0.70%)
4. Eastern Orthodoxy (0.70%)
5. Other Christian (1.00%)
6. Islam (0.40%)
7. Hinduism (0.20%)
8. Buddhism (0.20%)
9. Judaism (0.03%)
10. Other religion (0.30%)
11. No religion (14.1%)

The great majority of the Portuguese population belongs to the Catholic Church. Religious observance remains strong in northern areas, while the population of Lisbon and southern areas are generally less devout.

Religious minorities include a little over 400,000 Protestants and Mormons (3.84% of the total population).

There are also about 100,000 Muslims (1%) and 45,000 Hindus (0.43%), most of whom came from Goa, a former Portuguese colony on the west coast of India (Some Muslims also came from former two Portuguese African colonies with important Muslim minorities: Guinea-Bissau and Mozambique).

There are also about 1,500 Jews, 2,000 Baha'i and 35,000 Sikhs (0.34%). Portugal is also home to about 17,000 Buddhists, mostly Chinese from Macau and a few Indians from Goa.

As of 2018, Portugal is one of the most religious countries in Europe; most Portuguese believe with certainty in the existence of God, and religion plays an important role in the life of most Portuguese. According to the Pew Research Center, 40% of Portuguese Catholics pray daily.

=== Religious map of Portuguese municipalities ===
Religion by municipality according with the 2021 Census.

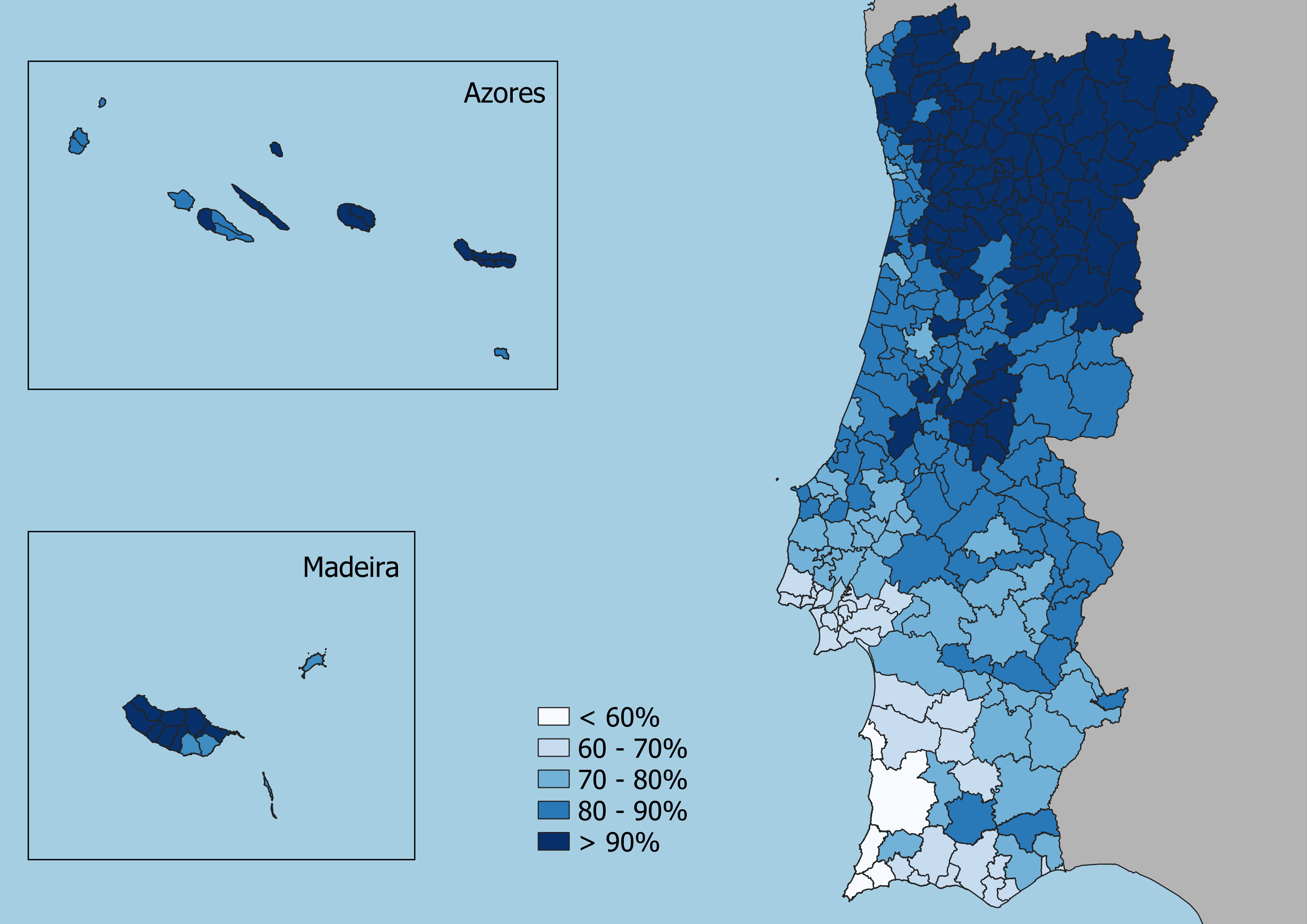
Percentage of Catholics by municipality.

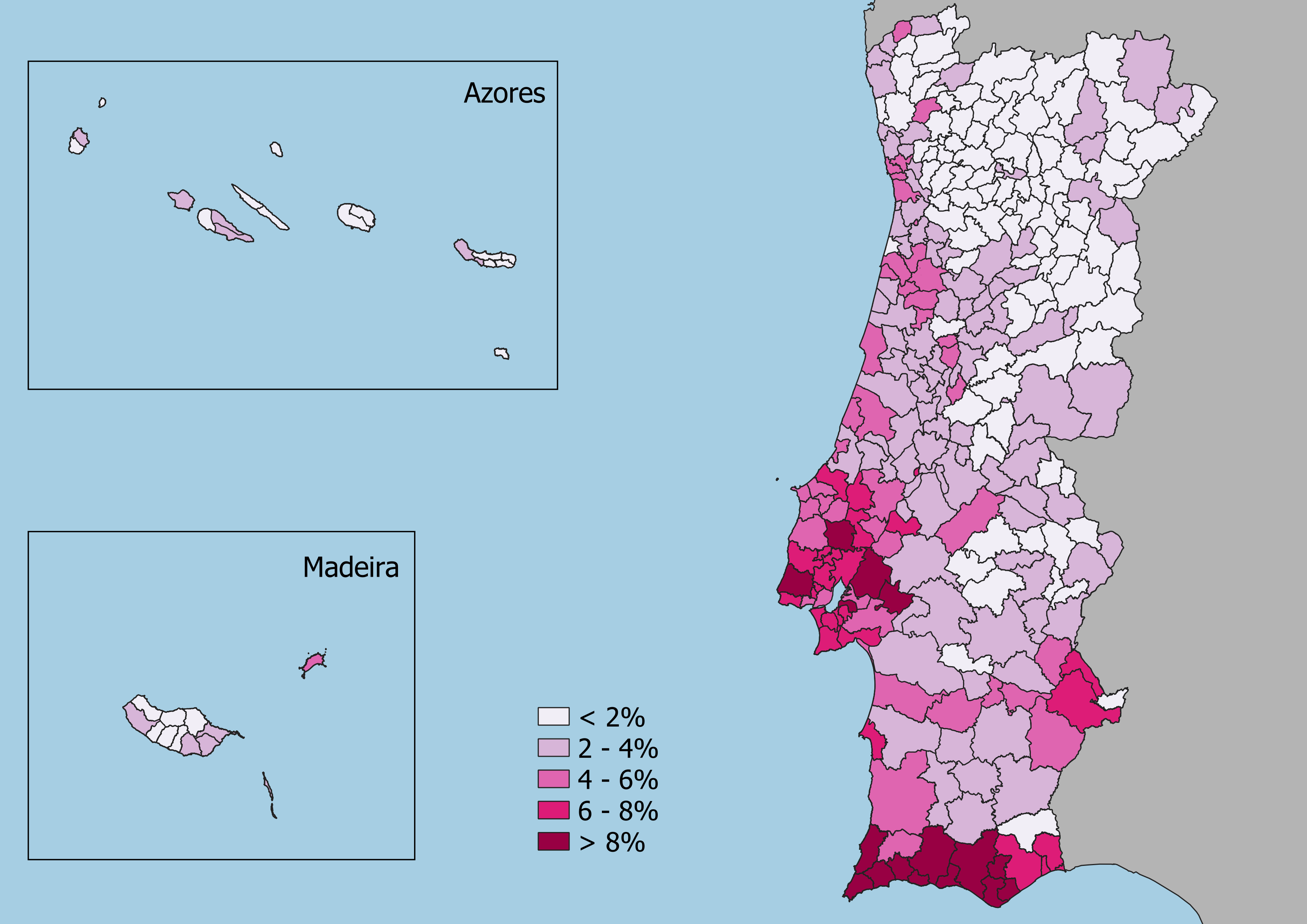
Percentage of Other Christians by municipality.

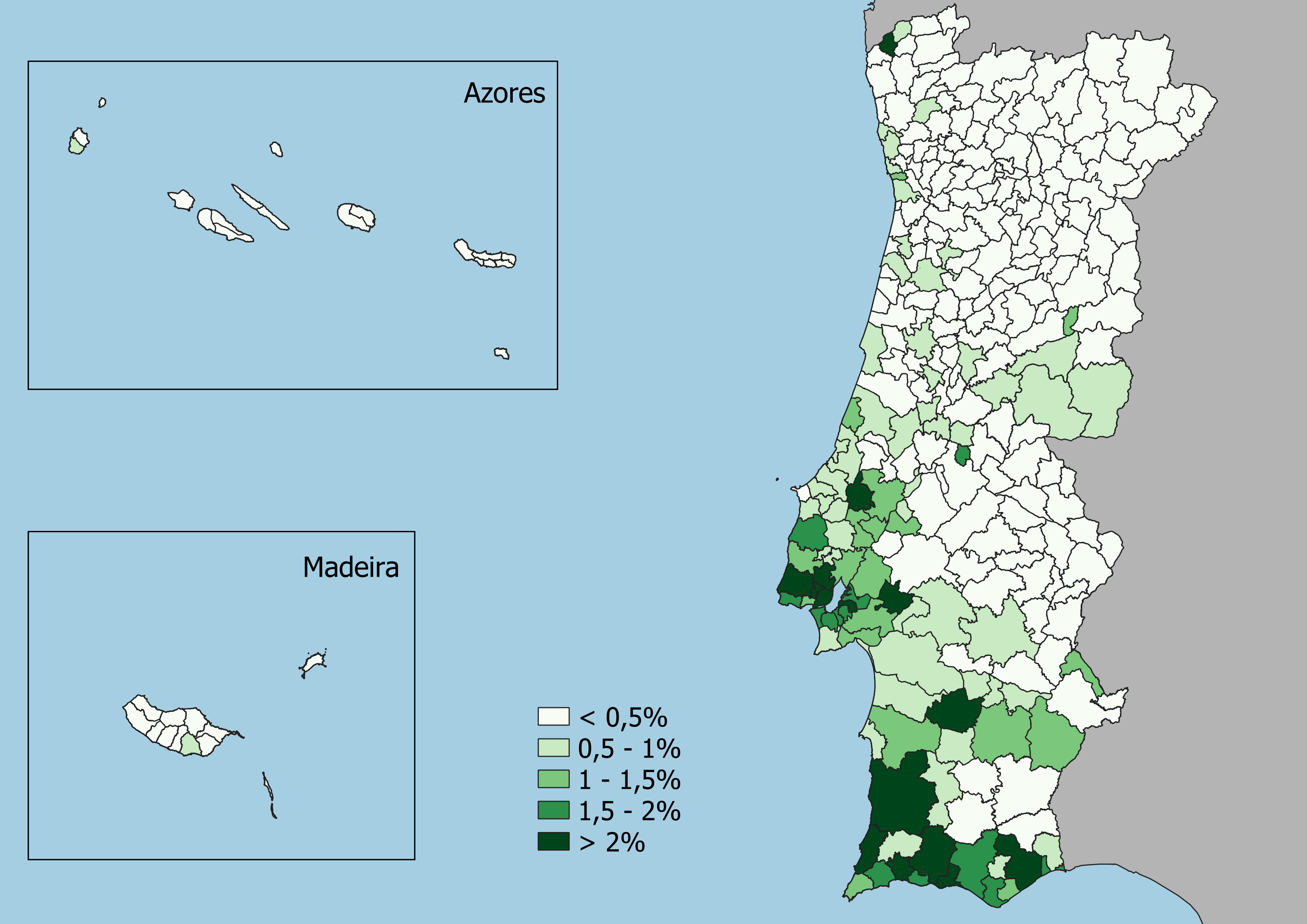
Percentage of Other religions (Non-Christians) by municipality.

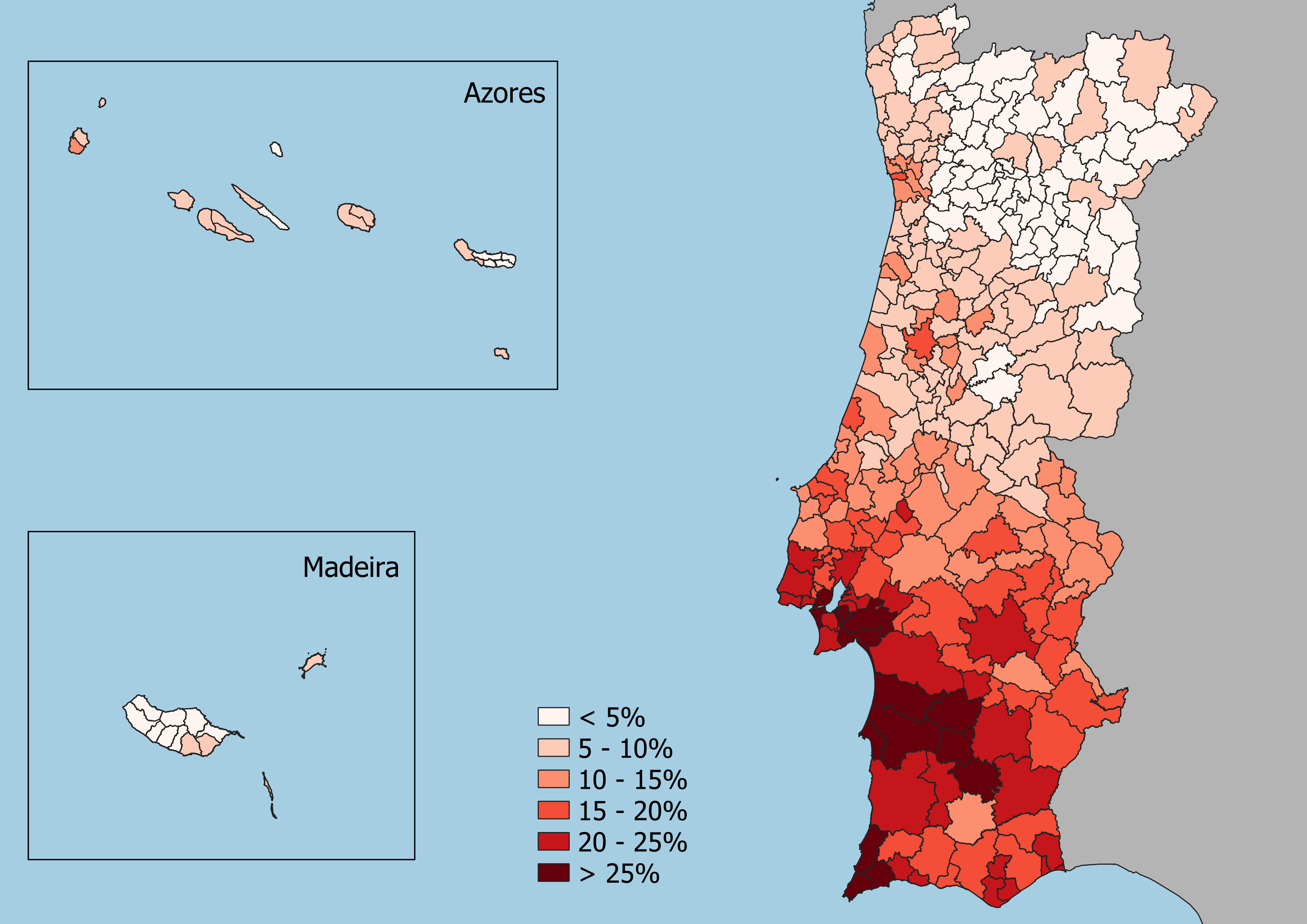
Percentage of non religious by municipality.

== Education ==
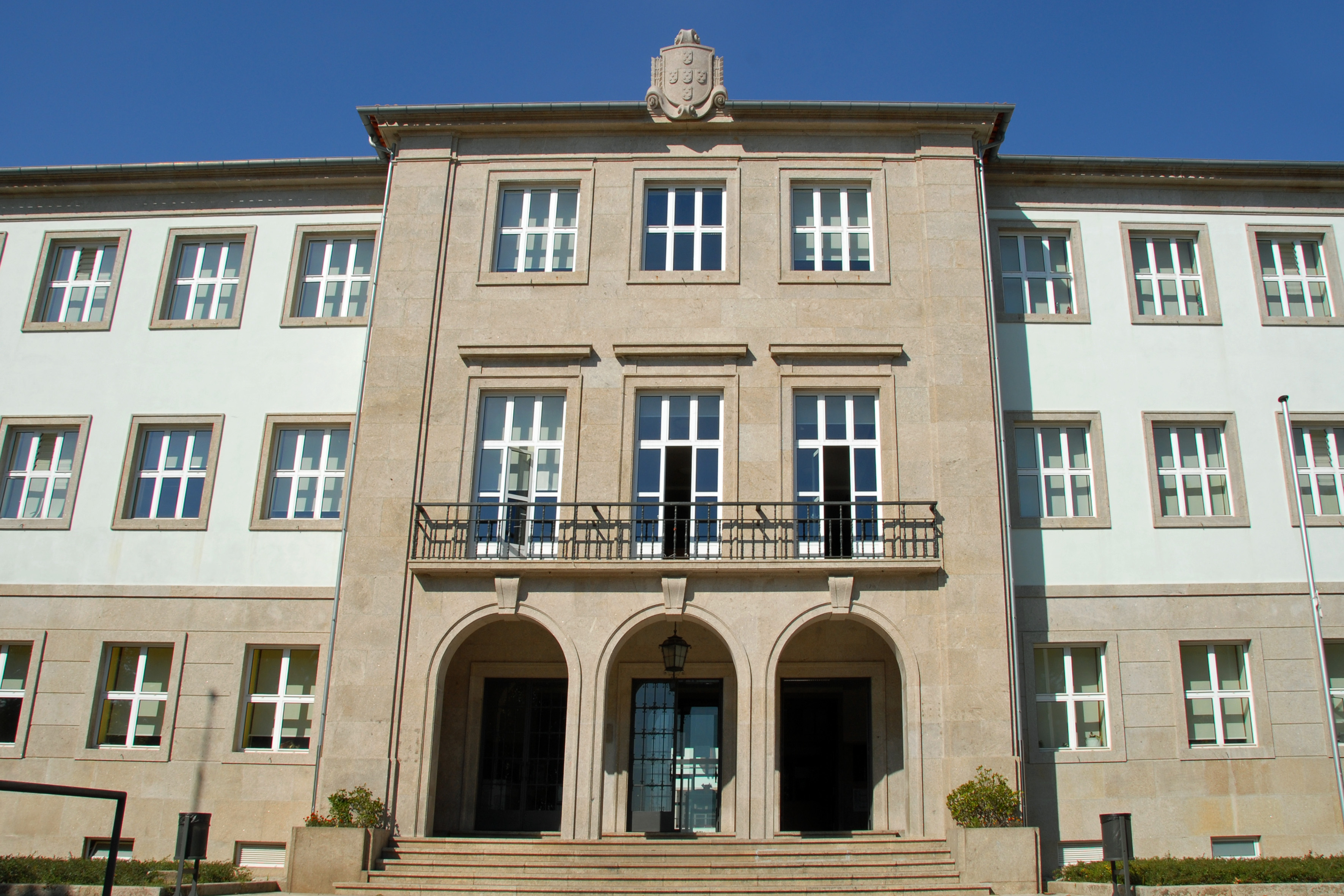
Carolina Michaelis highschool in Cedofeita

=== Literacy ===
definition: age 15 and over can read and write (2021 official INE estimate)

total population: 96.92%
male: 97.90%
female: 96.04%

School life expectancy (primary to tertiary education)
total: 17 years
male: 17 years
female: 17 years (2020)

== See also ==
- Portugal census
- Portugal
