= Languages of Portugal =

- Official: Portuguese, Mirandese (official, but locally used)
- Regional: Leonese, Barranquenho (transitional language), Minderico (argot)
- Minority: Caló
- Foreign: English (30%), Galician (15%), Spanish (10%)
- Signed: Portuguese Sign Language, Madeiran Sign Language
- Keyboard layout: QWERTY
- Source: ebs_243_en.pdf (europa.eu), (cia.gov)

The languages of Portugal are Portuguese, Mirandese, Portuguese Sign Language, Leonese and Caló, with the inclusion of other linguistic entities like argots and transitional languages. Historically, Celtic and Lusitanian were spoken in what is now Portugal.

== Modern ==
Portuguese is practically universal in Portugal, but there are some specificities.

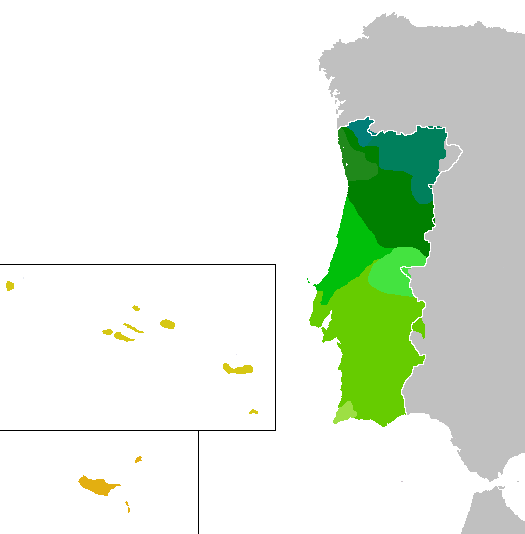
Portuguese dialects of Portugal

- Dialects of Portuguese in Portugal
  - Alentejan Portuguese
  - Algarvian Portuguese
  - Azorean Portuguese
  - Beiran Portuguese
  - Estremaduran Portuguese
  - Northern Portuguese (interâmnico)
  - Madeiran Portuguese
- Barranquenho – A transitional language spoken in Barrancos, originally part of the Alentejan dialect of Portuguese, but influenced by Spanish and Extremaduran.
- Caló – a mixed Iberian-Romani language spoken by the Romani people in Portugal. A Para-Romani language based on Romance grammar, with an adstratum of Romani lexical items through language shift by the Romani community. It is often used as an argot or secret language.
- Leonese – A language or variety of the Astur-Leonese group. Despite being mainly spoken in Spain, in the region of Leon, the Leonese language is spoken on a small village on the Portuguese side of the border, Riudeonore. The Riunorese dialect, influenced by Portuguese instead of Spanish, has an unknown number of speakers, it might be extinct, and if it is not, it has very few speakers.
- Minderico – A sociolect or argot spoken in Minde, extinct in what comes to its original use (being a speech only the merchants of Minde would understand), yet, still conserved.
- Mirandese – A language or variety of the Astur-Leonese group spoken in Tierra de Miranda in northeastern Portugal, recognized officially as a minority language in 1999.
- Portuguese Sign Language

In addition, it is estimated that 59.6% of Portuguese adults (aged 18–64) spoke English, 21.5% spoke French, 14.8% spoke Spanish as foreign languages as of 2016.

== Sample text ==
=== Romance languages ===
História de um louco criminoso (Story of a crazy criminal), written originally in Rionorese Leonese.

Mirandese	Leonese (Rionorese)	Portuguese	English
Un tal Miguel quedou-se de pequeinho sien pai i la mai, marota, terminou-se por casar cul Tiu Domingo Tano. I el era malo i batie al rapaç i batiu-le na cabeça. Qu'el de pequeinho era listo i culas porradas que le dou na cabeça puso-se boubo.	Un tal Miguel ficou de piquenu sin pai e a mai, marota, terminou-se di cassar cun al Tiu Domingo Tano. I iêl iera mau i batia-le al rapace i bateu-le na cabeça. Que iêl de piquenu iera listu i cun as porradas que le dou na cabeça pusu-se tonto.	Um tal Miguel ficou de pequeno sem pai e a mãe, marota, acabou por casar com o Tio Domingo Tano. E ele era mau e batia ao rapaz e bateu-lhe na cabeça. Que ele desde pequeno era esperto e com as pancadas que lhe deu na cabeça fez-se tonto.	A so called Miguel was left without a father as a child and the mother, naughty, ended up marrying Uncle Domingo Tano. And he was bad and hit the boy and hit him on the head. Though he was smart since he was little and the blows he gave him to the head made him stupid.

*due to the fact that Minderico has no established grammar, merely a handful of invented adjectives and nouns using portuguese grammar, and due to the lack of information on it, it is not on the table.

*due to the lack of information on barranquenho, it is not on the table.

=== Caló ===
The Lord's Prayer

Caló	English
Y les penó: Pur manguelareis, penelad: Amaro Dada, oté andré o Tarpe, majarificable sinele tun nao. Abillele tun chim. Sinele querdi tun pesquital andré a jolili, sasta andré o Tarpe. Diñamangue achibes amaro manro de cada chibes. Y amangue ertina amarias visabas, andiar sasta mu ertinamos á os sares, sos debisarelen amangue buchi. Y na enseeles amangue andré o chungalo y choro.	And he said to them: When you pray, say: Our Father in heaven, hallowed be Your name. Your kingdom come, Your will be done, on earth as it is in heaven. Give us this day our daily bread and forgive us our debts, as we also have forgiven our debtors. And lead us not into temptation, but deliver us from evil.

== Historically ==
Other languages have been extensively spoken in the territory of modern Portugal:

=== Pre-Roman languages ===
Pre-Roman languages of Iberia c. 200 BC.

- Proto-Celtic & Celtic languages
  - Celtiberian language
  - Gallaecian language
- Tartessian language
- Lusitanian language

=== Roman, Post-Roman and Medieval languages ===
- Arabic language
  - Andalusi Arabic
  - Classical Arabic
- Berber languages
- Germanic languages
  - Gothic language
  - Suebi language
  - Vandalic language
- Latin language
  - Vulgar Latin
    - Iberian Romance languages
      - Galician-Portuguese
      - Astur-Leonese
        - Mirandese language
      - Mozarabic languages
      - Judeo-Romance languages
        - Judeo-Portuguese
- Scythian languages
  - Alanic language

== See also ==
- Iberian languages
- Languages of Spain
- Iberian Romance languages
