= Minderico language =

Romance language of Portugal

Minderico
- Piação do Ninhou
- Native to: Portugal
- Region: Minde
- Native speakers: 500 (2010)
- Language family: Indo-European: Italic; Latino-Faliscan; Latin; Romance; Ibero-Romance; Galician-Portuguese; Portuguese; Minderico
- Early forms: Proto-Indo-European: Proto-Italic; Old Latin; Vulgar Latin; Proto-Romance; Galician-Portuguese; Portuguese

Language codes
- ISO 639-3: drc
- Glottolog: mind1263
- ELP: Minderico

Minderico, also known as Piação do Ninhou (the language of Minde), was originally a sociolect or a secret language spoken by textile producers and traders in the freguesia (civil parish) of Minde (Alcanena, Portugal).

== History ==
After this initial phase (18th century), Minderico began to expand its vocabulary continuously and creatively. This expansion was (and continues to be) intimately related to the socio-cultural experiences of the inhabitants of Minde. For example, names and nicknames of well-known persons from Minde and the neighbouring areas were used as lexemes to express physical or psychological characteristics, as these characteristics were salient for those persons. This method of lexical formation can be explained by the fact that Minde, due to its geographical isolation, is a small and close knit community, where everyone knows one another. Therefore, using names of persons as a means to express the characteristics associated to them was immediately understood amongst members of the speech community; this was not an obstacle to effective communication.

The Interdisciplinary Centre for Social and Language Documentation (CIDLes), an institution dedicated to the research and documentation of endangered languages in Europe and the development of language technologies for lesser-used languages, is now working on the linguistic documentation of Minderico and, together with the speech community, on its revitalization.

== See also ==
- Languages of Portugal
- Cant (language)

== Bibliography ==
- Carvalho, José António de (1969). Alguns Vocábulos do Calão Minderico. Minde: Casa do Povo de Minde.
- Endruschat, Annette / Ferreira, Vera (2006). "Das Minderico", Lusorama 65–66, 206–229.
- Endruschat, Annette / Ferreira, Vera (2007). "Minderico: a diversidade linguística na homogeneidade portuguesa". In Glauco Vaz Feijó & Jacqueline Fiuza da Silva Regis (Hrsg.), Festival de Colores: Dialoge über die portugiesischsprachige Welt, Tübingen: Calepinus Verlag, 379–390.
- Ferreira, Vera (2009). "Moinho da fonte ancho da piação dos charales do Ninhou – uma do badalo a escadeirar na Terruja do Camões". Jornal de Minde nº 610, 8.
- Ferreira, Vera (2011). "De código secreto por língua do quotidiano a língua ameaçada. O CIDLeS e a revitalização do minderico". Desafios, 36–37.
- Ferreira, Vera (2011). "Eine dokumentationslinguistische Beschreibung des Minderico". In Annette Endruschat & Vera Ferreira (Hrsg.), Sprachdokumentation und Korpuslinguistik – Forschungsstand und Anwendung. München: Martin Meidenbauer, 143–170.
- Ferreira, Vera & Peter Bouda. 2009. Minderico: an endangered language in Portugal. In Peter K. Austin, Oliver Bond, Monik Charette, David Nathan & Peter Sells (eds.), Proceedings of Conference on Language Documentation and Linguistic Theory 2. London: SOAS.
- Frazão, Francisco Santos Serra (1939). "Calão minderico—Alguns termos do «calão» que usam os cardadores e negociantes de Minde, concelho de Alcanena". In: Revista Lusitana, vol. XXXVII. Lisboa: Livraria Clássica Editora, 101–143.
- Martins, Abílio Madeira et al. (1993). Piação dos Charales do Ninhou. Minde: Centro de Artes e Ofícios Roque Gameiro.
- Martins, Abílio Madeira et al. (2004). Piação dos Charales do Ninhou. Minde: Centro de Artes e Ofícios Roque Gameiro.
- Martins, Abílio Madeira / Nogueira, Agostinho (2002). Minde. História e Monografia. Minde: Grafiminde.
- Matos, Alfredo 1966. "Mancheia de anotações a ‘Alguns vocábulos do calão Minderico’". Jornal de Minde nº 137, 4.
- Reis, Miguel Coelho dos 1983. Vocabulário do Calão de Minde. Mira de Aire: Tipografia Capaz.
- Vicente, Manuel Fernandes (2009). "Minderico renasce com apoio da Volkswagen a línguas ameaçadas". In: Público, edition of 17.08.2009, 22.
