= Minde, Portugal =

Minde
- Civil parish
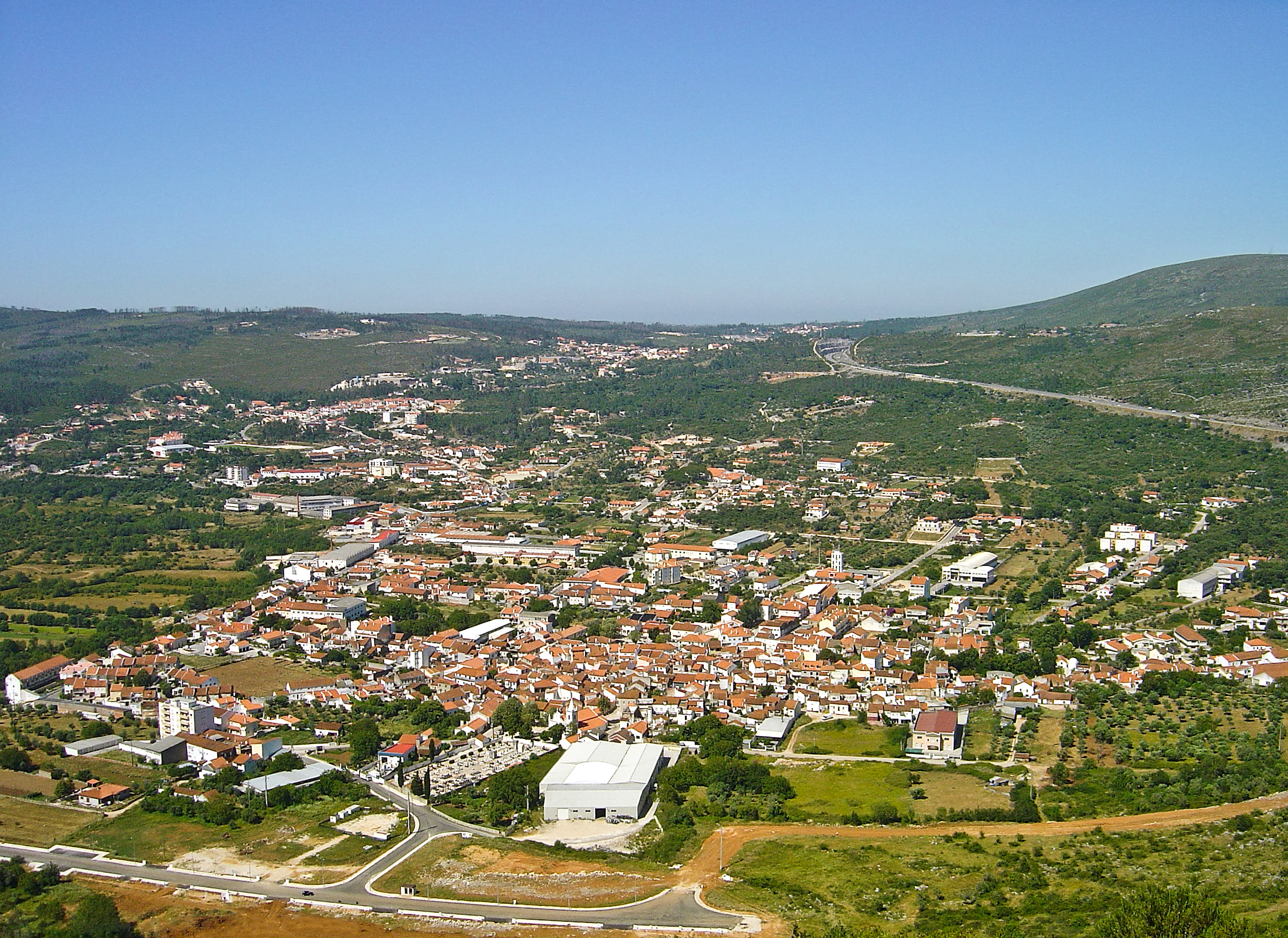

- Coat of arms

- Location in Portugal
- Coordinates: 39.517°N 8.683°W
- Country: Portugal
- Region: Oeste e Vale do Tejo
- Intermunic. comm.: Médio Tejo
- District: Santarém
- Municipality: Alcanena

Area
  - Total: 21.14 km^{2} (8.16 sq mi)

Population (2011)
  - Total: 3,293
  - Density: 155.8/km^{2} (403.4/sq mi)
- Time zone: UTC+00:00 (WET)
  - Summer (DST): UTC+01:00 (WEST)

Minde (Ninhou in the Minderico language) is a town and freguesia (civil parish) of Alcanena Municipality, in the District of Santarém, in Portugal. The population of the entire civil parish in 2011 was 3,293, in an area of 21.14 km² (Censos 2011). Minde is known as the place of origin of the Minderico, a sociolect or argot spoken by traders. The civil parish is located in a landscape of intensive karst. People who originate from or live in Minde are informally known as Minderico (said to have been created as a variation of Mindense (which is also correct) because, as a result of the regional development of the clothing industry, the people of Minde were considered to be wealthy (rico in Portuguese, thus Minderico). The formal and ever-used form of Minderico is Mindense.

== Geography ==
Minde is located in a landscape of intensive karst in an area of central mainland Portugal. It was part of the historical province Ribatejo. The town proper borders a karst basin. In the summer the polje is fertile fields, in winter, in case of heavy rain, a temporary lake. Minde is part of the Médio Tejo region in central Portugal.

=== Climate ===
Climate data for Minde, altitude: 222 m (728 ft)
Month	Jan	Feb	Mar	Apr	May	Jun	Jul	Aug	Sep	Oct	Nov	Dec	Year
Average rainfall mm (inches)	131.7 (5.19)	101.4 (3.99)	77.2 (3.04)	94.3 (3.71)	74.8 (2.94)	29.3 (1.15)	7.0 (0.28)	10.6 (0.42)	47.7 (1.88)	129.4 (5.09)	139.4 (5.49)	152.0 (5.98)	994.8 (39.16)
Source: Portuguese Environmental Agency

== History ==
Minde was first mentioned in official records in the year 1165, in a letter written by Afonso I of Portugal, where he established a hostel in what is now modern-day Minde.

In 1892, Minde became part of the Torres Novas município, leaving Porto de Mós. In 1914, the Alcanena município is founded, and, since then, Minde is part of it.

== Notable people ==
- Isaac Achega, drummer
- Louis Anjos, chef
- Adelaide Ferreira (born 1 January 1959 in Minde, Alcanena), singer
- Mila Ferreira, singer and model
- Tiago Guedes, choreographer
- Alfredo Roque Gameiro (4 April 1864, Minde - 15 August 1935, Lisbon), painter and graphic artist who specialized in watercolors.

== Gallery ==
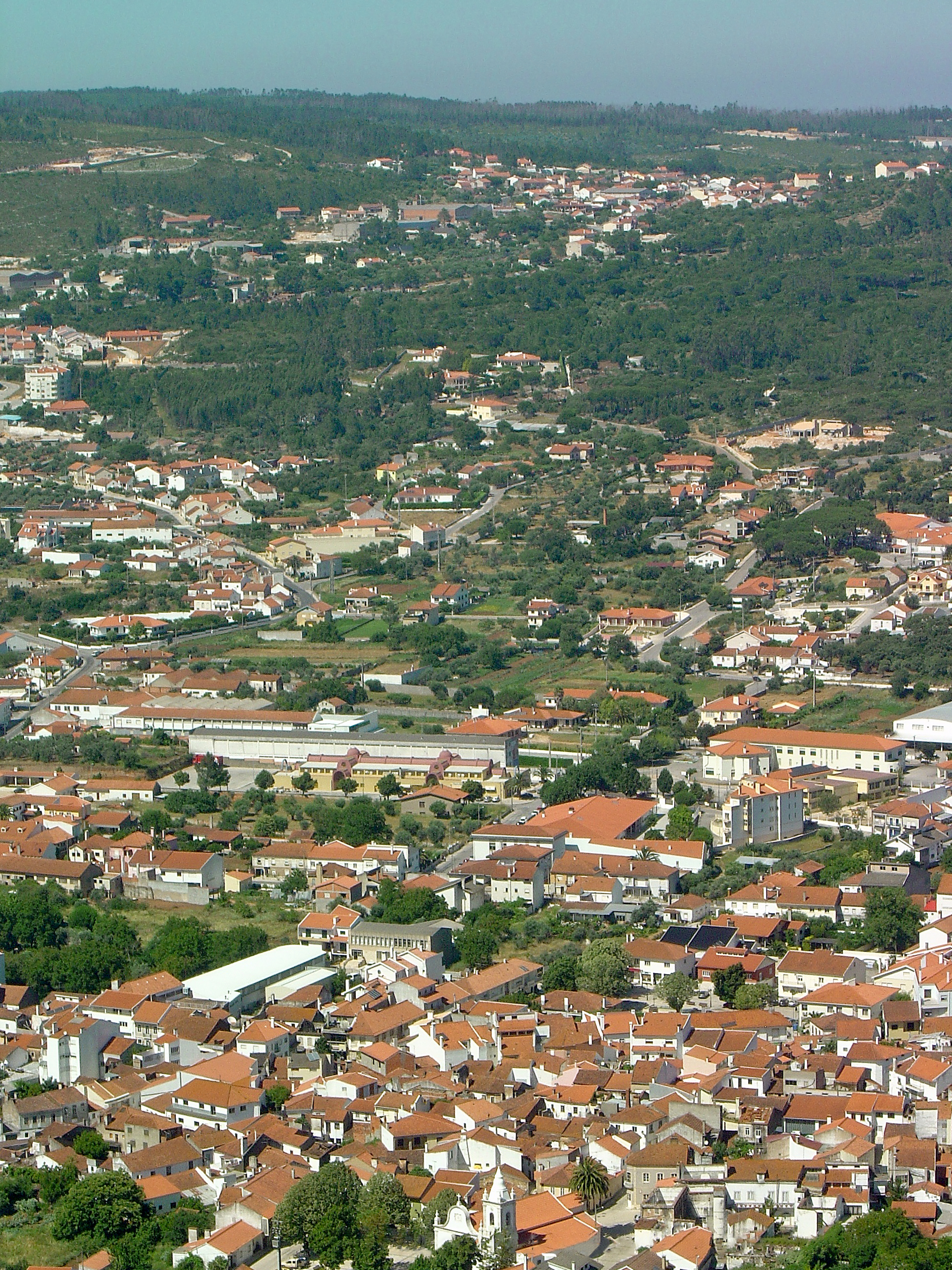
A view of Minde.

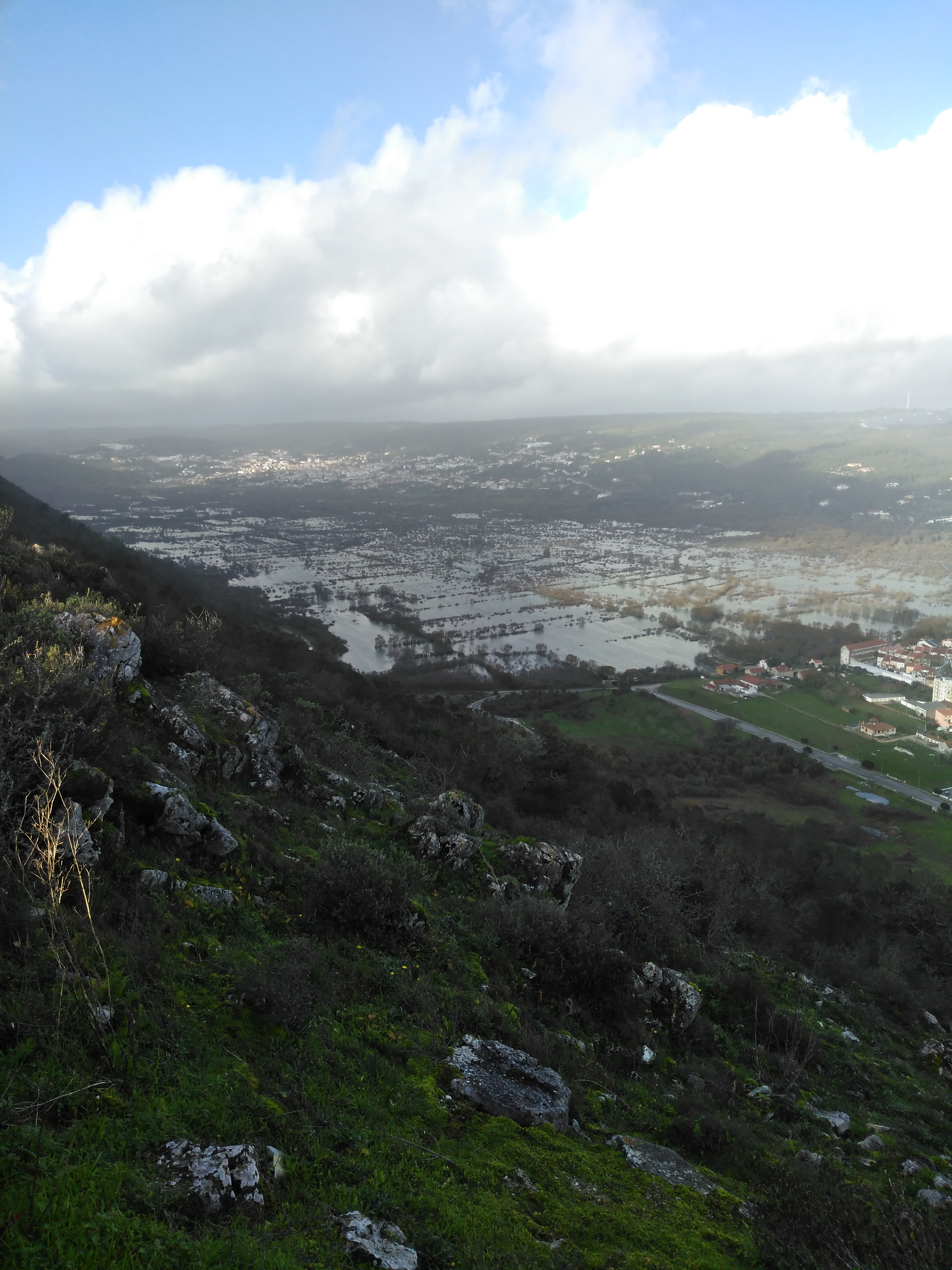
Karst basin in Minde, flooded by a temporary lake.

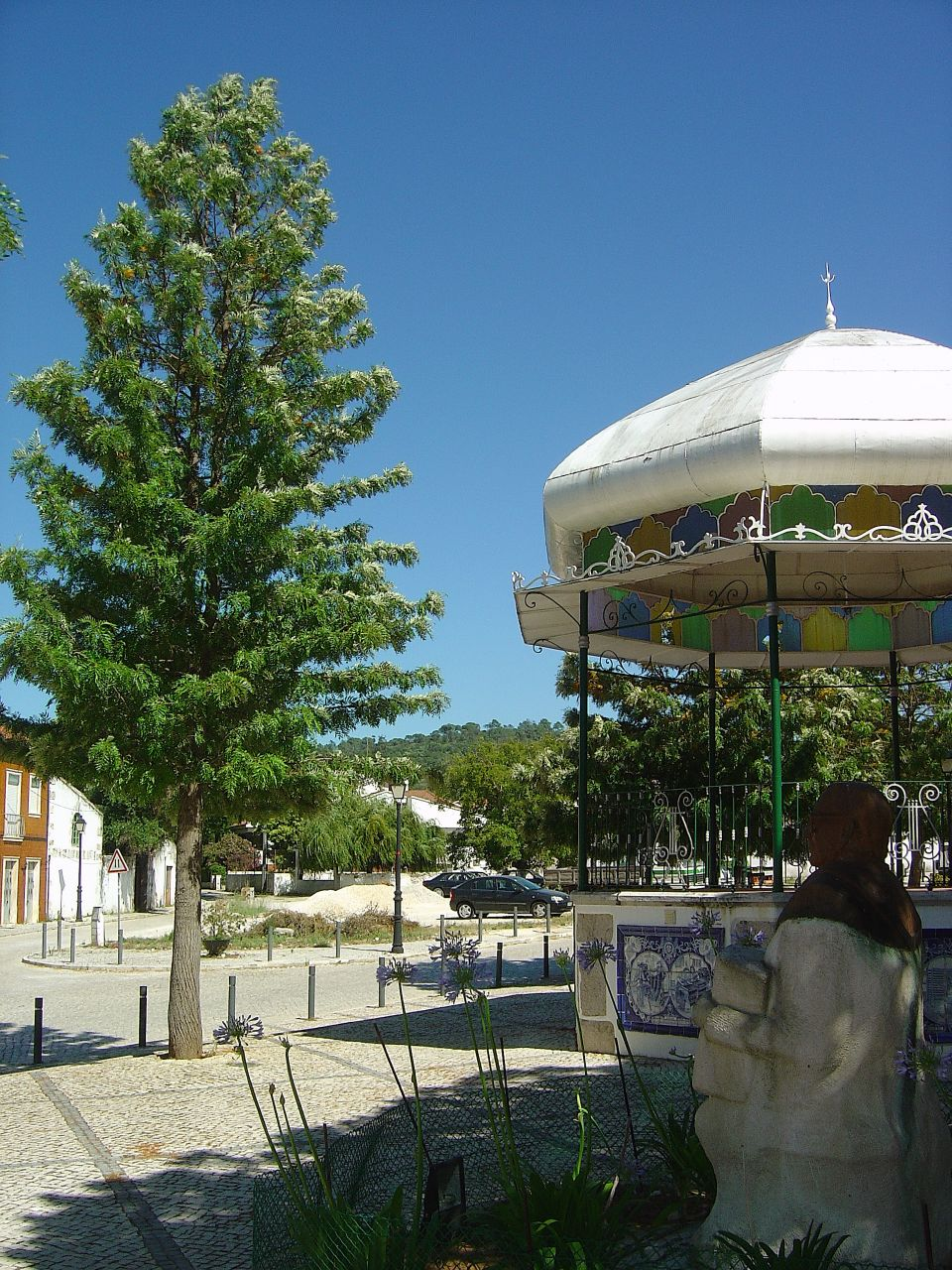
Bandstand in Minde.
