= El Real de San Vicente =

- Municipality
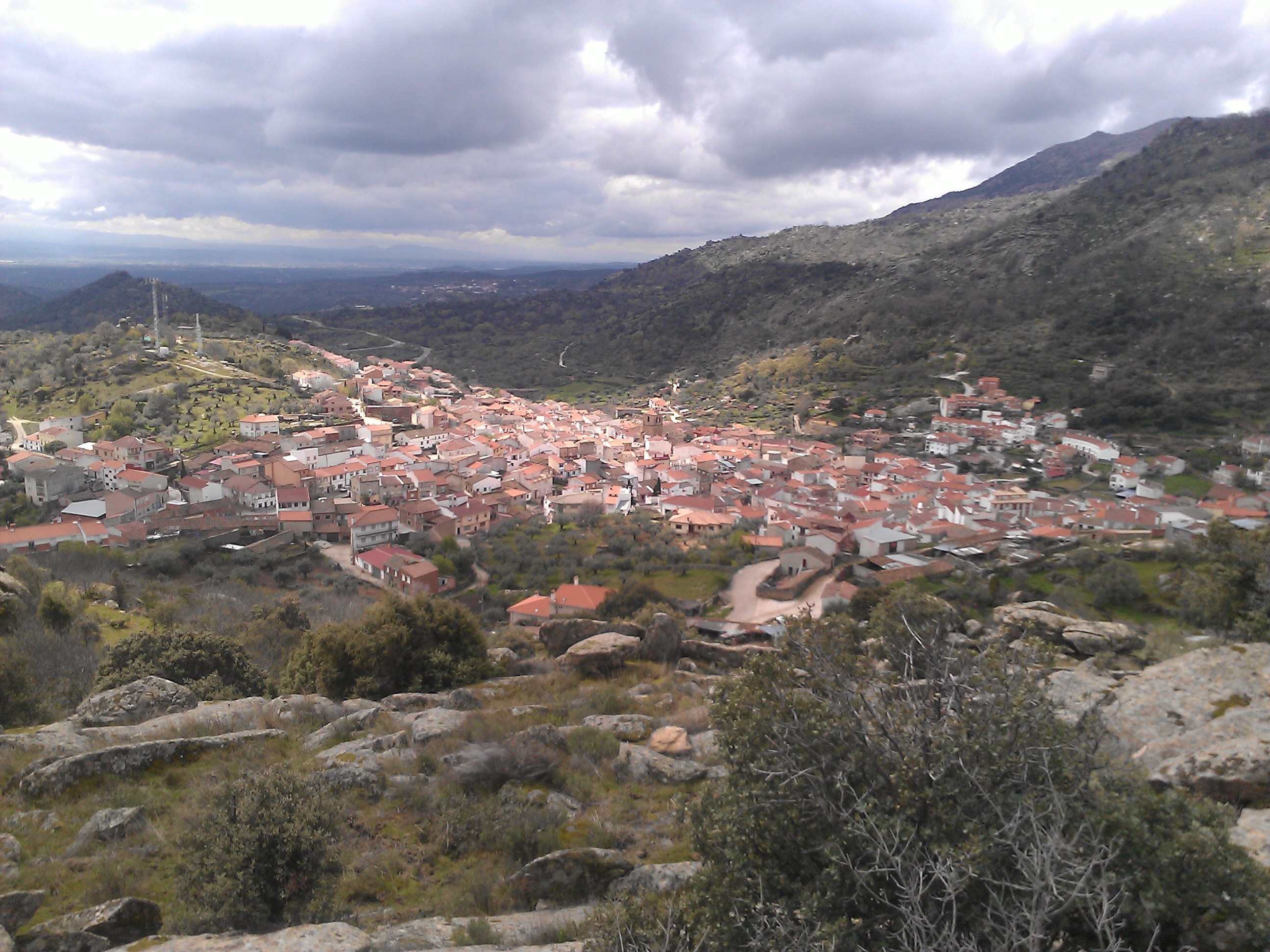
- View of the town

- Coat of arms
- Interactive map of El Real de San Vicente
- Location within Castilla–La Mancha Location within Spain
- Coordinates: 40°08′N 4°41′W
- Country: Spain
- Autonomous community: Castilla–La Mancha
- Province: Toledo

Area
  - Total: 54 km^{2} (21 sq mi)
- Elevation: 800 m (2,600 ft)

Population (2025-01-01)
  - Total: 966
  - Density: 18/km^{2} (46/sq mi)
- Time zone: UTC+1 (CET)
  - Summer (DST): UTC+2 (CEST)

El Real de San Vicente is a municipality of Spain belonging to the province of Toledo, Castilla–La Mancha. According to the 2006 census (INE), the municipality has a population of 1050 inhabitants.

== Geography ==
The town is located in the Sierra de San Vicente, a mountain range in between the Tagus and the Tiétar displaying a landscape characterised by granite outcrops and dehesas of Quercus rotundifolia and Quercus faginea.

== History ==
Early instances of human occupation of the territory in the municipality include the site of Cerro del Oso, about one kilometer to the northeast of the village. It featured Iron Age occupation as a fortified hilltop settlement (castro) and earlier proposed phases of occupation perhaps tracing back to the Chalcolithic–Early Bronze age. The onset of the Roman world brought the end of many hilltop settlements.

Founded not later than 1400, El Real de San Vicente obtained the privilege of township in 1631. The road connecting Castillo de Bayuela with El Real de San Vicente was built in 1929. Phone service became available in 1955.
