= Harpalus wohlberedti =

Scientific classification
- Kingdom: Animalia
- Phylum: Arthropoda
- Class: Insecta
- Order: Coleoptera
- Suborder: Adephaga
- Family: Carabidae
- Genus: Harpalus
- Species: H. wohlberedti

Binomial name
- Harpalus wohlberedti Emden & Schauberger, 1932

Species of beetle

Harpalus wohlberedti is a species of ground beetle in the subfamily Harpalinae. It was described by Emden & Schauberger in 1932. According to a study in 2012, it is most commonly found in Holm Oak forests.
