= Holm oak =

Holm oak may refer to:

- Quercus ilex, tree native to South and Southeast Europe and parts of France
- Quercus rotundifolia, tree native to the Iberian Peninsula and Northwest Africa
- Quercus agrifolia, tree native to the Southwestern United States and Northern Mexico
