= Dehesa =

Multifunctional agro-sylvo-pastoral system

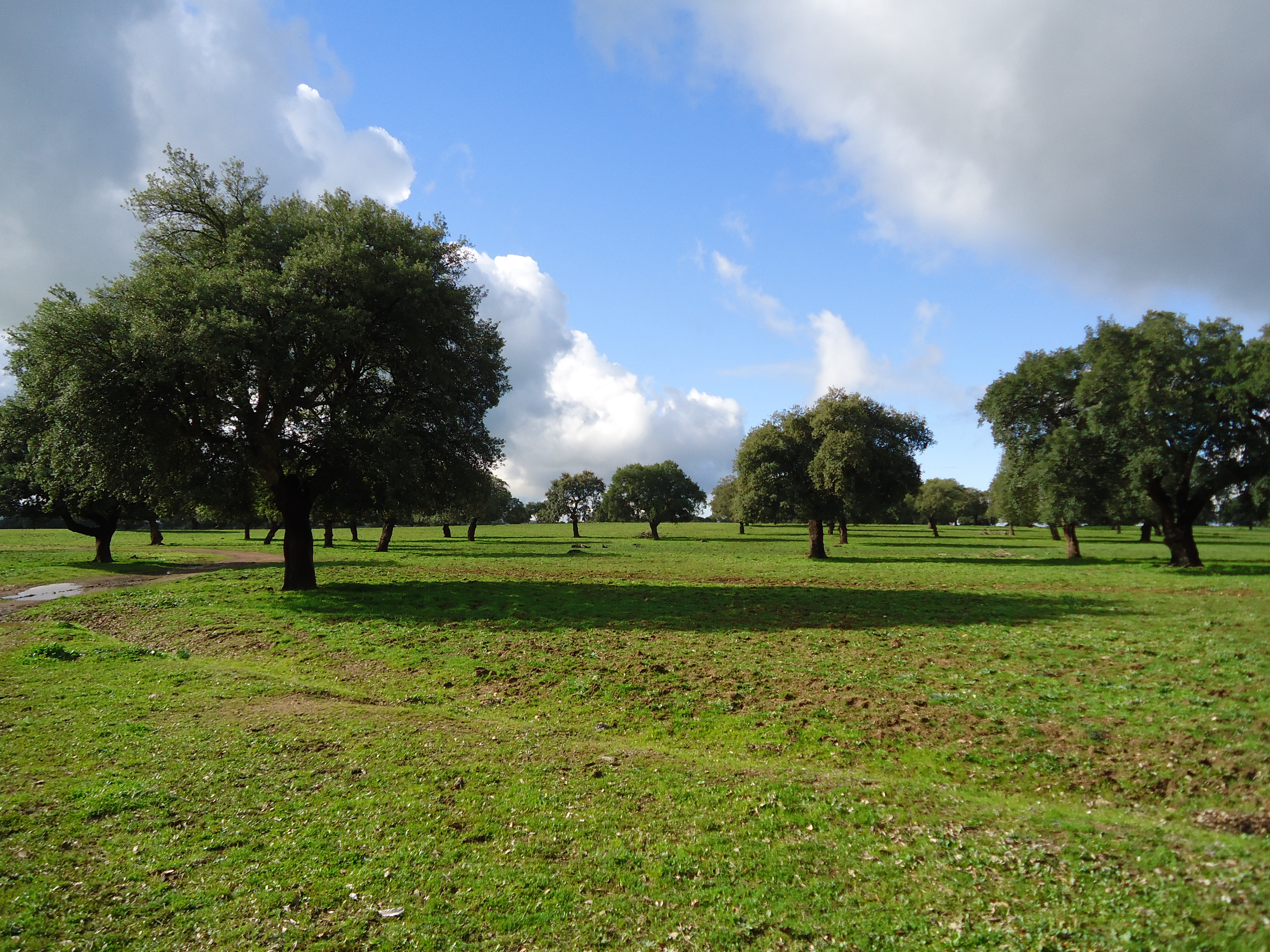
A dehesa in Badajoz, southwest Spain

A dehesa (Spanish pronunciation: [de'esa]) is a multifunctional, agrosylvopastoral system (a type of agroforestry) and cultural landscape of southern and central Spain and southern Portugal; in Portugal, it is known as a montado. Its name comes from the Latin defensa (fenced), referring to land that was fenced and usually destined for pasture. Dehesas may be private or communal property (usually belonging to the municipality). Used primarily for grazing, they produce a variety of products, including non-timber forest products such as wild game, mushrooms, honey, cork, and firewood. They are also used to raise the Spanish fighting bull and the source of jamón ibérico, the Iberian pig. The main tree component is oaks, usually ballota (Quercus rotundifolia) and cork (Quercus suber). Other oaks, including the Pyrenean oak (Quercus pyrenaica) and the Portuguese oak (Quercus faginea), may be used to form dehesa, the species utilized depending on geographical location and elevation. Dehesa is an anthropogenic system that provides not only a variety of foods, but also wildlife habitat for endangered species such as the Spanish imperial eagle.

== Ecology ==
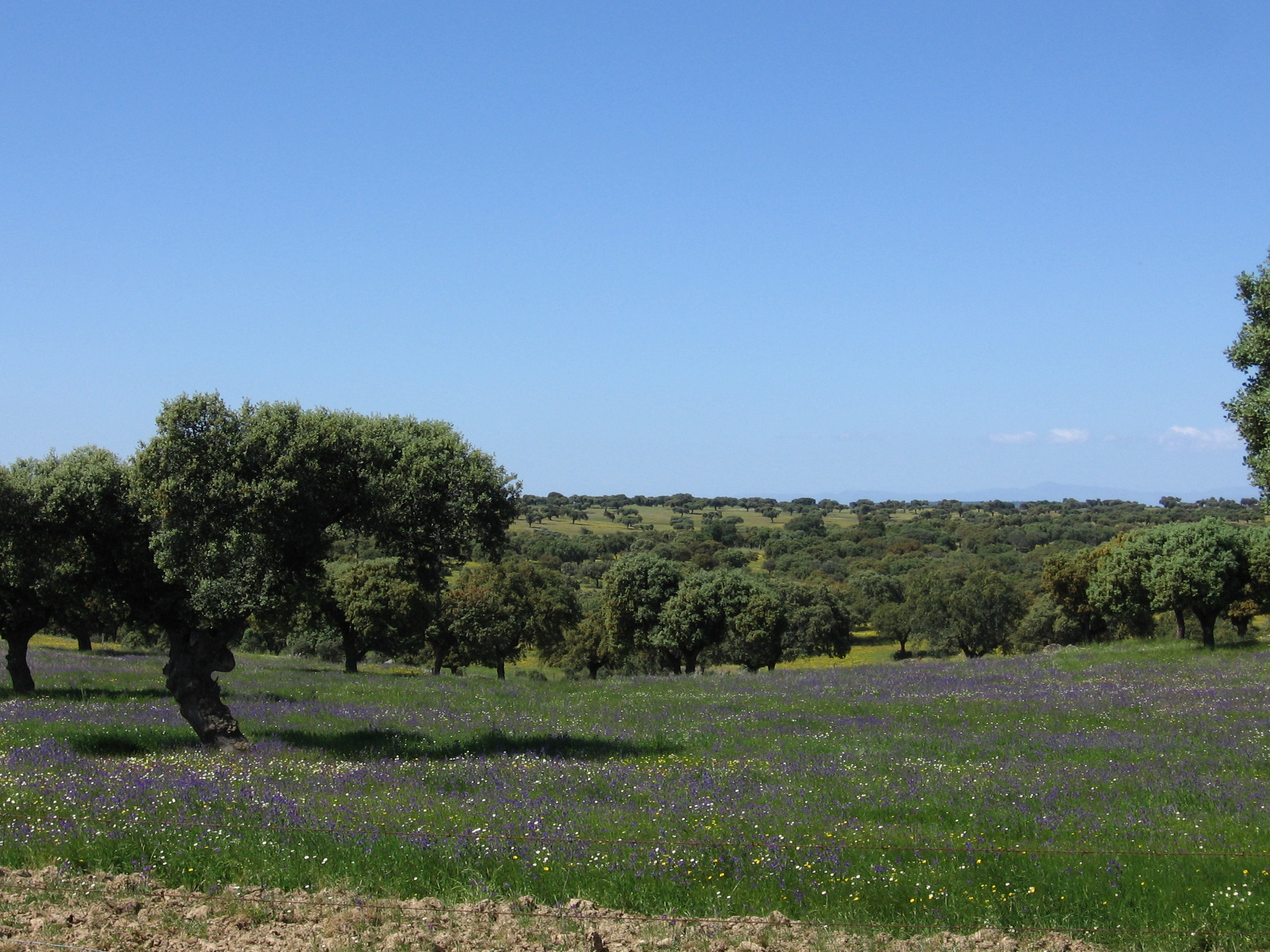
Dehesa in Extremadura, Spain

The dehesa is derived from the Mediterranean forest ecosystem, consisting of grassland featuring herbaceous species, used for grazing cattle, goats, and sheep, and tree species belonging to the genus Quercus (oak), such as the ballota oak (Quercus rotundifolia), although other tree species such as beech and pine trees may also be present. Oaks are protected and pruned to produce acorns, which the famous black Iberian pigs feed on in the autumn during the montanera. Ham produced from Iberian pigs fattened with acorns and air-dried at high elevations is known as Jamón ibérico ("presunto ibérico", or "pata negra" in Portuguese), and sells for premium prices, especially if only acorns have been used for fattening.

In a typical dehesa, oaks are managed to persist for about 250 years. If cork oaks are present, the cork is harvested about every 9 to 12 years, depending on the productivity of the site. The understory is usually cleared every 7 to 10 years to prevent the takeover of the woodland by shrubs of the rock rose family (Cistaceae), often referred to as "jara" (Spanish) or "esteva" (Portuguese), or by oak seedlings. Oaks are spaced to maximize overall productivity by balancing light for the grasses in the understory, water use in the soils, and acorn production for pigs and game.

The dehesa is in many ways similar to the California oak woodland, although the former is typically much more intensively managed.

== Importance and economic context ==
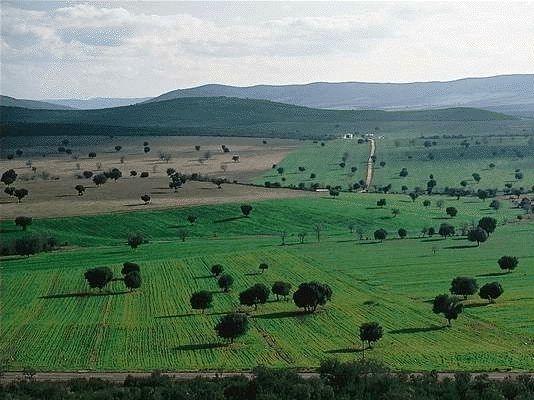
A dehesa in the Montes de Toledo

The dehesa system has great economic and social importance on the Iberian Peninsula because of both the large amount of land involved and its importance in maintaining rural population levels. The major source of income for dehesa owners is usually cork, a sustainable product that supports this ancient production system and old growth oaks.

== Extent ==
Dehesas cover nearly 20,000 square kilometers on the Iberian Peninsula, mainly in:

Portugal

- Alentejo
- Algarve

Spain

- Córdoba
- Extremadura
- Salamanca
- Sierra Morena
  - Sierra de Aracena
  - Sierra Norte de Sevilla

== See also ==
- Cabañeros National Park
- List of types of formally designated forests
- Oak savanna
- California oak woodland
- Satoyama
- Silvopasture
