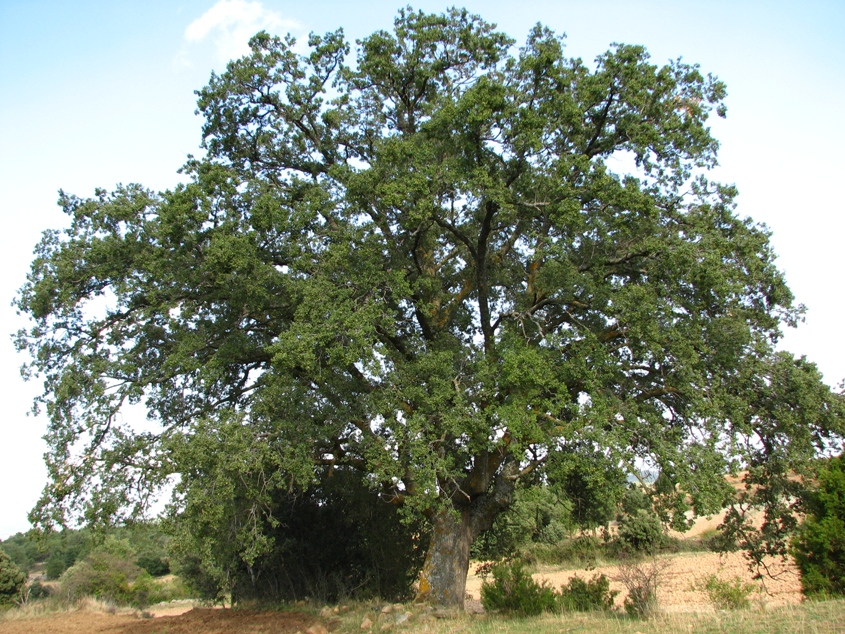

Conservation status
- Least Concern (IUCN 3.1)

Scientific classification
- Kingdom: Plantae
- Clade: Tracheophytes
- Clade: Angiosperms
- Clade: Eudicots
- Clade: Rosids
- Order: Fagales
- Family: Fagaceae
- Genus: Quercus
- Subgenus: Quercus subg. Quercus
- Section: Quercus sect. Quercus
- Species: Q. faginea

Binomial name
- Quercus faginea Lam.
- Distribution map

Synonyms
- Quercus alpestris Boiss.; Quercus villariana A.Camus; Quercus tlemcenensis (A. DC.) Trab.

= Quercus faginea =

Portuguese oak

Species of oak tree

Quercus faginea, the Portuguese oak, is a species of oak native to the western Mediterranean region in the Iberian Peninsula. Similar trees in the Atlas Mountains of northwest Africa are usually included in this species, or sometimes treated as a distinct species, Quercus tlemcenensis. It occurs in mountains from sea level to 1,900 metres (6,200 feet) above sea level, and flourishes in a variety of soils and climates. Out of all the oak forests in the Iberian Peninsula, the southern populations of Portuguese oak were found to have the highest diversity and endemism of spider species.

== Description ==
Q. faginea is a medium-sized deciduous or semi-evergreen tree growing to 20 metres (66 feet) tall, with a trunk up to 80 centimetres (31 inches) in diameter, with grey-brown bark. The tree can live as long as 600 years. The leaves are 4–10 cm (1 1/2–4 in) long and 1.2–4 cm broad (rarely to 15 cm long and 5 cm broad), glossy dark green to gray-green above, and variably felted grey-white below; the margins have five to 12 pairs of irregular teeth. Leaf fall is typically in mid- to late winter. The flowers are catkins, produced between March and April, almost always before holm oak, which grows in similar areas. The acorns are oblong-ovoid, 2–2.5 cm long, maturing in 6 months to disperse in September or October.

The species commonly develops galls due to gall wasp activity; the galls are brown, 1–2 cm diameter, and have a spongy, cork-like interior.

The two subspecies are:

Image	Scientific name	Description	Distribution
	subsp. faginea	Rarely exceeds 15 meters in height, smaller, greener, dentate-serrate leaves, shorter catkins (2–4 cm), distributed through more continental climates around 500-1500 m altitude. Predominant subspecies in Spain.	Native to the Iberian Peninsula
	subsp. broteroi (Cout.) A.Camus (syn. Q. tlemcenensis)	Can reach up to 20 m in height, larger, densely tomentous, ashen, crenate-dentate leaves and longer catkins (4-7.5 cm), distributed alongside rivers and streams, slopes and valleys up to 700 m altitude. Predominant subspecies in Portugal.	Native mainly to Northwest Africa and the Southwest of the Iberian Peninsula

Portuguese oak also hybridises readily with other related oaks such as Algerian oak (Q. canariensis), downy oak (Q. pubescens), and Pyrenean oak (Q. pyrenaica) (producing the hybrids Q. × tlemcenensis, Q. × subpyrenaica and Q. × numantina, respectively) which can make identification difficult.

The specific name faginea refers to the superficial resemblance of the leaves to those of the beech (Fagus).

== Uses ==
The wood has been used traditionally as firewood and as timber for construction (beams and posts). The acorns, like those of the holm oak or cork oak, are an important food for free-range black Iberian pigs reared for jamón ibérico production. It is also occasionally planted as an ornamental tree.

== Gallery ==
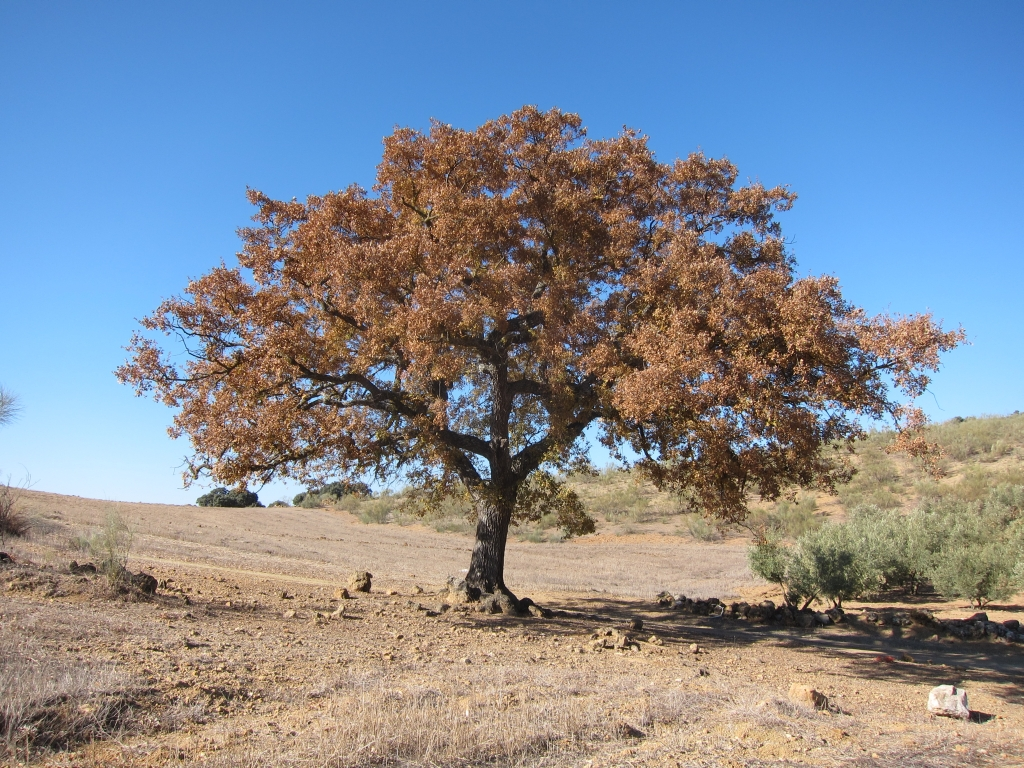
Quercus faginea in wintertime

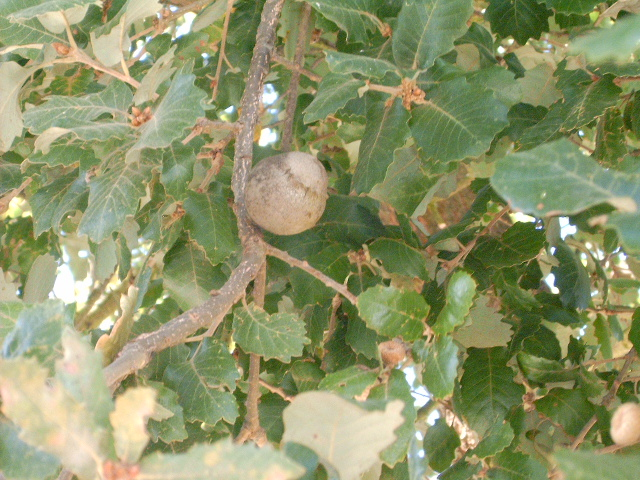
Quercus faginea subsp. broteroi
