= Silvopasture =

Agricultural practice of grazing animals in woodland

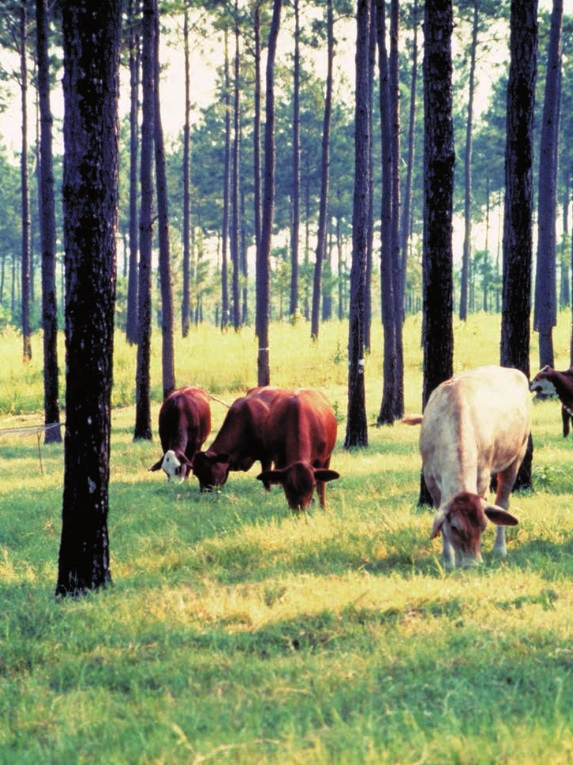
Silvopasture integrates livestock, forage, and trees. (photo: USDA NAC)

Silvopasture (silva is forest in Latin) or wood pasture is the practice of integrating trees, forage, and the grazing of domesticated animals in a mutually beneficial way. It utilizes the principles of managed grazing, and it is one of several distinct forms of agroforestry. If done correctly, silvopastures can count as nature-based solutions to climate change.

Properly managed silvopasture (grazed woodland) can increase overall productivity and long-term income due to the simultaneous production of tree crops, forage, and livestock. It can provide environmental benefits, and has been practiced in many parts of the world for centuries.

== Benefits ==
=== Potential for climate change adaptation ===
Climate change adaptation has garnered more importance in UNFCCC negotiations in the 2020s as opposed to previous strategies, when mitigation was given more focus. Silvopasture systems which integrate trees and other woody plants along with crops, forage and livestock are a highly sustainable strategy that has huge adaptive capacity, besides its mitigation potential. Open pasture systems, on the other hand, which is often a consequence of widespread deforestation can exacerbate issues such as reduced water availability and nutrient imbalances in soils, leading to negative effects on ecosystems, local climates, and communities—challenges that are further intensified by climate change.

Silvopasture systems influence microclimatic conditions, offering advantages over open pastures and a suitable ‘middle ground’ solution compared to forests in the context of climate change adaptation. By retaining partial tree cover, silvopastures create a more moderated environment that helps mitigate temperature extremes and optimize soil conditions. This offers less stressful conditions for the grazers as compared to the open pastures improving its feed and water intake, reproductive health, milk yields, fitness, and longevity.

The integration of trees in silvopastures provide shade, which reduces the intensity of photosynthetically active radiation (PAR) compared to open pastures, while still allowing more light than dense forests. This balance supports diverse plant growth and improved forage quality. One study measured air temperatures near the soil surface (0.25 m) to be consistently cooler in silvopastures than in open pastures, with reductions of up to 7%, while soil temperatures at depths of 5–10 cm are also significantly lower in silvopastoral systems compared to open pastures.

Silvopastures moderate soil moisture levels, with trees contributing to better water retention in some seasons through shading, less wind and reduced evaporation. Studies found that during winter and spring, soil moisture levels in silvopastures are slightly lower than forests but higher than open pastures, while in summer, they provide a balance, preventing excessive drying as seen in open pastures.

These microclimatic adaptations—cooler temperatures, moderated light levels, and improved soil moisture—enhance the resilience of silvopastures to climate stressors such as heatwaves and droughts, which in turn leads to a more robust agricultural system.

Grazing controls understory vegetation and reduces the accumulation of fuel biomass, lowering the risk of forest fires. This leads to the maintenance of profitability and biodiversity and reduction / avoidance of carbon release due to fire when compared to an open pasture and forest. This problem is of particular importance in fire-prone regions like Southern Europe.

A study with a focus on the US suggests that welfare of cows benefit from a Silvopasture ecosystem, as they are shown to have improvement in physiological response to heat stress, increased grazing time and decreased standing time (resting and ruminanting) when compared to cows in the conventional pasture grazing system. This means that a silvopasture system allows livestock to better adapt to climate change.

Besides providing better ecosystem services like water quality and wildlife habitat, silvopasture systems provide farmers and producers with diversified income streams from timber, forage, and livestock products. This enhances resilience to market fluctuations and climate variability - which is enhanced by climate change - making the system highly attractive to smaller or resource-limited producers.

=== Climate change mitigation ===
Silvopastoral systems act as carbon sinks that sequester more carbon than monoculture forests or pastures with similar density. Their reduced reliance on machinery also lowers greenhouse gas emissions, making them more sustainable than traditional land-use systems. In contrast, open pastures without tree cover tend to emit more greenhouse gases due to higher soil exposure and less climate buffering.

Studies show that carbon uptake (negative emissions) is lowest in open pastures, intermediate in silvopastures, and highest in reference forests. This pattern is consistent across systems like tree alley-cropping and orchard-hay systems. Open pastures have higher CO_{2} fluxes due to factors like soil respiration and warmer temperatures. Removing canopy trees in open pastures further increases these fluxes by reducing evapotranspiration and increasing soil moisture.

Silvopastures also help retain more soil carbon than open pastures. While converting forests to pastures initially increases soil carbon, this gain is short-lived due to higher temperatures and faster decomposition. After a few years, soil carbon in open pastures matches that of forests. Silvopastures, with their mix of trees and pastures, may help maintain soil carbon over time, although significant changes often take decades to occur.

Additionally, converting forests to open pastures raises soil nitrogen levels and decreases the carbon-to-nitrogen ratio. While silvopastures show more balanced nitrogen levels, open pastures can increase nitrous oxide (N_{2}O) emissions, a potent greenhouse gas. Overall, silvopastures provide dual climate benefits: they sequester more carbon and reduce harmful nitrogen emissions, making them an effective strategy for climate resilience.

=== Other benefits ===
Silvopasture systems create diverse habitats, supporting biodiversity and ecosystem resilience. By preserving native plants, they help local wildlife and maintain traditional agroforestry knowledge. These systems attract pollinators and beneficial insects, improving crop productivity and ecosystem health. Proper selection of diverse tree and forage species is key to enhancing biodiversity both above and below ground.

Incorporating a mix of native tree species in silvopastures not only boosts economic viability but also increases biodiversity, ensuring the success and productivity of the system. Trees offer various benefits like providing forage, improving soil health, offering timber, aiding in erosion control, and supporting livestock health. When selecting trees, it's essential to choose species that complement grazing activities. Fast-growing species like black locust, willow, and mulberry are ideal as they integrate well with grazing. Additionally, indigenous tree species can attract plenty of insect species, which in turn will lead to more bird species, hence enhancing biodiversity and making the natural ecosystem more resilient. Livestock can also consume unharvested fruits, helping to control pests and diseases.

Silvopastoral systems can yield better forage during droughts due to the adapted microclimate. Forage species are carefully chosen based on soil type, climate, grazing tolerance, shade tolerance and attraction to certain species. Shade-tolerant grasses like bahiagrass, bermudagrass, tall fescue, orchardgrass, and ryegrass, along with legumes such as subterranean clover and Sericea lespedeza, are commonly used in silvopastures. These species ensure optimized productivity, livestock nutrition, and ecosystem resilience.

== Implementation challenges ==
While silvopasture has great potential for climate change mitigation, adaptation, and sustainable agriculture, it requires proper planning, financial support, and technical knowledge. In the paper "Thinning forests or planting fields? Producer preferences for establishing silvopasture", published in 2021, the authors conducted a study of Silvopasture establishment preferences among livestock producers surveyed in Virginia (US). The survey indicated that only 8% were interested in planting trees (48% were very uninterested), while about 25% were very interested in thinning woodlands for silvopastures. Forfeited pasture was a constraint for planting for about half (48%) of respondents, while 27% considered thinning a means to expand pasture acres. Some of the most common challenges and barriers to silvopasture adoption include policy and regulatory hurdles, land tenure, lack of knowledge and awareness, economic constraint and cultural change.

=== Knowledge ===
A primary barrier to wider adoption of silvopasture systems is the limited knowledge and awareness among farmers and landowners of alternative agroforestry practices. Farmers need to be equipped with knowledge of tree-livestock interactions, pasture rotation, and soil health management for a successful implementation of a silvopasture. Livestock can trample or overgraze young trees and requires protective measures like fencing or controlled grazing. Trees may also compete with grasses for light, water, and nutrients, potentially reducing pasture productivity if not managed properly. Choosing the wrong tree species could result in slower growth, provide poor shade distribution, and leave toxic effects on livestock. Additionally, fire risks can be a concern in silvopastoral systems, particularly in dry climates where trees and accumulated biomass may increase flammability. Without proper firebreaks, species selection, and management strategies, silvopasture could inadvertently contribute to wildfire hazards rather than mitigating them.

To overcome these challenges, well-structured education and extension programs are essential to provide farmers with the necessary knowledge and technical support. Training initiatives, demonstration farms, and knowledge-sharing networks could help bridge the gap, ensuring that farmers can confidently implement silvopasture systems in a way that maximizes productivity while mitigating risks.

=== Economic ===
Establishing silvopastures requires substantial upfront investment in tree planting, fencing, and rotational grazing systems. Generally, silvopastures can be implemented in two primary ways: by introducing trees into existing pastures or by integrating pastures into woodland. Planting trees in pastures requires protecting young trees from livestock, years of waiting for productivity, and potentially restricting future land use. Conversely, converting woodlands into silvopastures involves thinning trees to increase light infiltration, which can be labor-intensive, require heavy machinery, and necessitate a strategy for managing felled trees. Thinned woodlands may also experience a surge in weeds and seedlings that must be controlled to establish pasture forage, posing additional challenges. Unlike conventional farms that generate annual profits, both aformentioned strategies take time to become financially viable. Studies indicate that agroforestry systems, including silvopastures, typically take 3–6 years to generate returns, leading to a delayed return on investment (ROI). Furthermore, silvopasture systems often require more labor and specialized knowledge than conventional farming, increasing costs for training and implementation.

While price fluctuations affect all agricultural systems, diversified revenue streams in silvopastures—such as timber, livestock, and forage—can provide greater resilience against market volatility. However, it remains unclear whether silvopastures consistently outperforms conventional monoculture farms in profitability.

=== Policy ===
Despite the recognized benefits of silvopastoral systems, several policy-related limitations create barriers for a successful implementation. One major challenge is the lack of binding international agreements. International agreements such as Agenda 21, a voluntary UN action plan for sustainable development adopted at the Rio Conference in 1992, recognize the potential role of silvopastoralism in sustainable land management. However, they remain largely non-binding. Consequently, at the national level, policy incentives and institutional support for silvopastoral systems are often lacking as many governments prioritize conventional agricultural systems. For example, a study from 2024 found that silvopasture producers in California primarily self-funded their systems, supplementing with various limited sources. However, the lack of clear funding mechanism constrained the scale of their implementation.

Furthermore, some policies actively discourage the integration of trees on farmland. Additionally, zoning regulations may classify silvopasture land as agricultural or forestry, which can ultimately restrict eligibility for subsidies or land-use incentives.

In some regions, there are unclear or restrictive land ownerships laws. This uncertainty around land tenure discourages farmers from committing to silvopasture as the systems requires long-term management.

== History ==
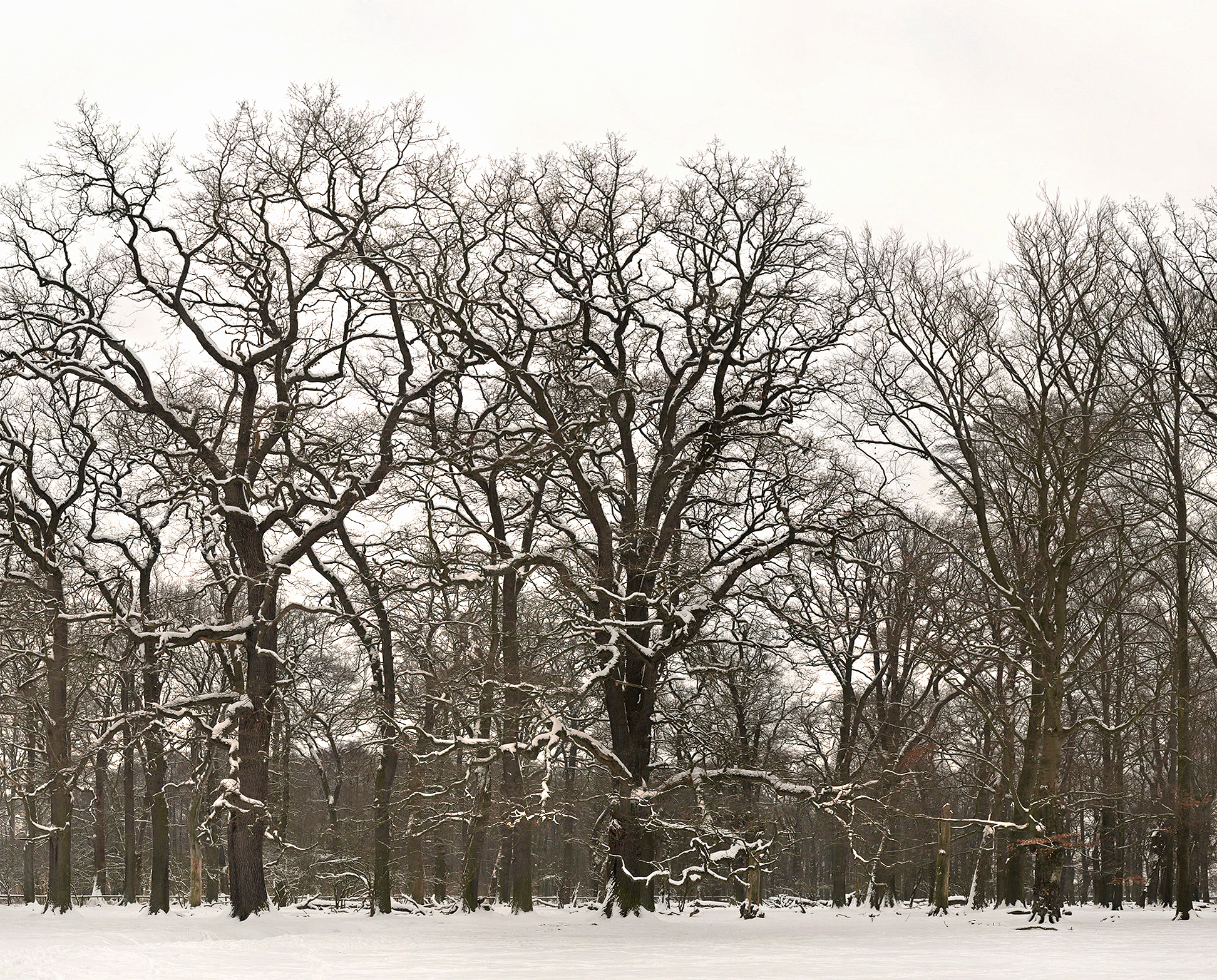
Wood pasture in winter in the Wisentgehege Springe game park near Springe, Hanover, Germany

According to the wood-pasture hypothesis, open, grazed woodlands of some form or another would have been part of the original European wildwoods even before they were used by humans. Fruit and nut and silvopasture systems covered large portions of central Europe until the 20th century, and are still widespread in some areas. Wood pasture, one of the oldest land-use practices in human history, is a historical European land management system in which open woodland provided shelter and forage for grazing animals, particularly sheep and cattle, as well as woodland products such as timber for construction and fuel, coppiced stems for wattle and charcoal making and pollarded poles. Since Roman times, pigs have been released into beech and oak woodlands to feed on the acorn and beech mast, and into fruit orchards to eat fallen fruit.

== United Kingdom ==
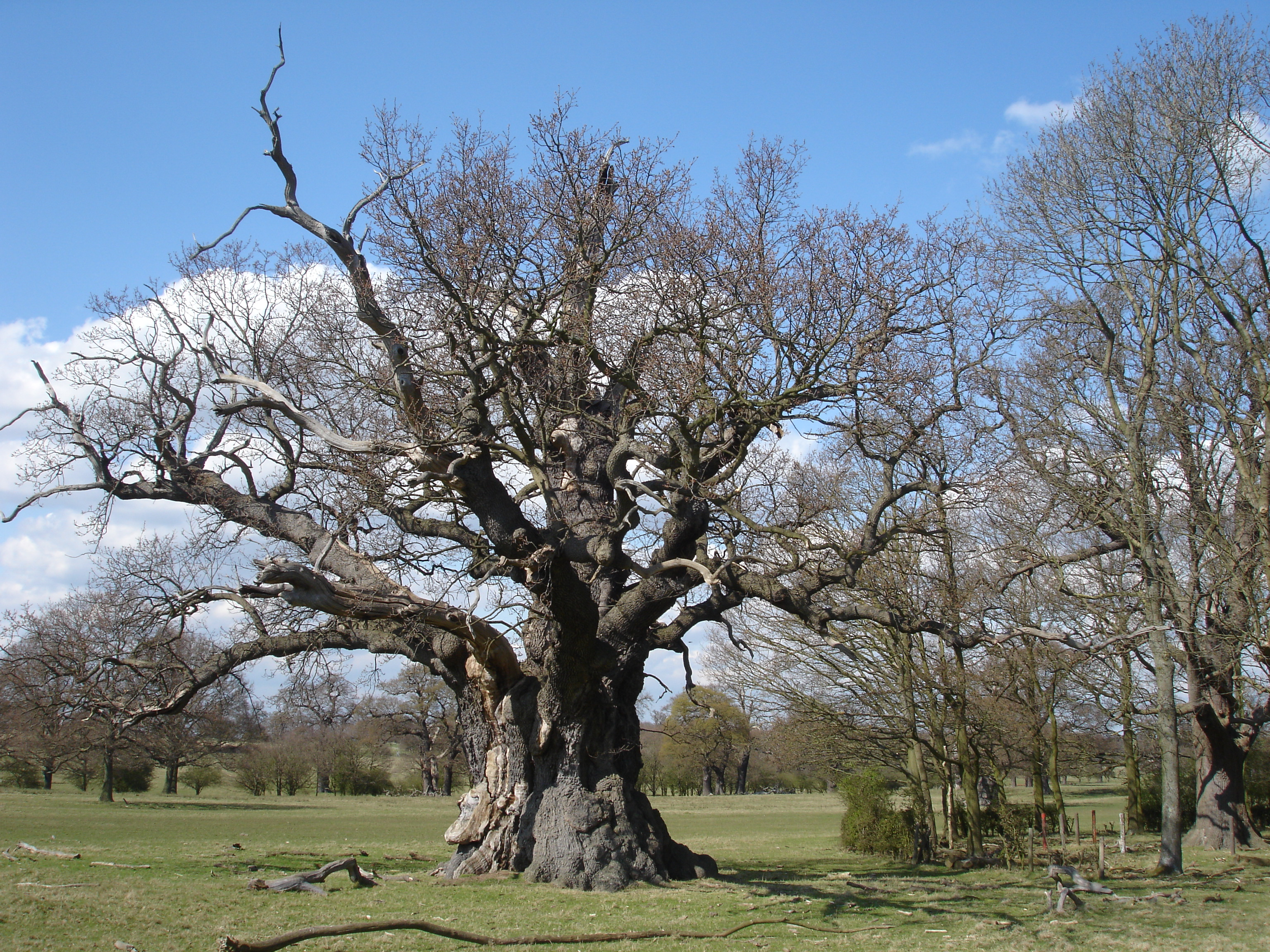
Veteran pollard oak, a sign of ancient wood pasture at Windsor

Tree species and planting densities are studied over a range of sites at The Silvopastoral National Network Experiment. Natural England's Environmental Stewardship scheme defines Wood Pasture, in the Farm Environmental Plan booklet, as a structure of open grown or high-forest in a matrix of grazed-grassland, heathland, and/or woodland floras.

Their experience shows sheep use the trees for shelter from wind. This could provide significant animal-welfare benefits. However, 'sheep time' close to trees results in soil compaction, with the greatest compaction after trees are planted at very low densities. Some botanists recommend trees be planted at no less than 400 per hectare to ensure good establishment.

Evidence of old wood-pasture management is detectable in many of the ancient woodlands of Scotland, such as Rassal ashwood in Ross-shire, and at Glen Finglas in the Trossachs. The Dalkeith Old Wood, belonging to the Duke of Buccleuch, cattle grazing beneath ancient oak, is designated as a Site of Special Scientific Interest (SSSI) (ASSI).

Epping Forest is one of the principal remnants of wood pasture in England. Here, the grazing of cattle was combined with the pollarding of trees for fuel, both for domestic consumption and for sale. This system continued in the parish of Loughton until being banned in 1879. The town's public hall, built with compensation money for the ending of the custom, is called the Lopping Hall in memory of the practice. Controlled cattle grazing and limited pollarding are still carried out by the conservators.

== United States ==
Silvopastures are the most viable and prominent agroforestry practice in the United States. In the southeastern US, longleaf pine/wiregrass restoration projects have trialled the effects on both economics and ecology of grazing cattle among the trees. This fire-resistant tree species originally grew at low density so that understory plants were available to browsing animals. The region was used as silvopastures by Spanish settlers from the sixteenth century, and this use continued into the early twentieth century, along with felling trees for timber. By the 1920s, most of the longleaf pine which once dominated around 92 million acres (about 37 million hectares) of ground between the states of Texas and Virginia had been cut down by European settlers. Removal of the trees, and loss of their associated ecosystem, led to significant soil erosion as well as replacement with dense commercial tree plantations and open agricultural fields. There has been continuing interest in silvopastures in the residual longleaf pine forests and land restoration projects, with evidence that the multiple income streams of timber and cattle are economically advantageous, along with wildlife restoration benefits. The legal protection of some species (e.g. red-cockaded woodpecker) that can be found in this habitat means that landowners may be able to add financial compensation as a further source of income.

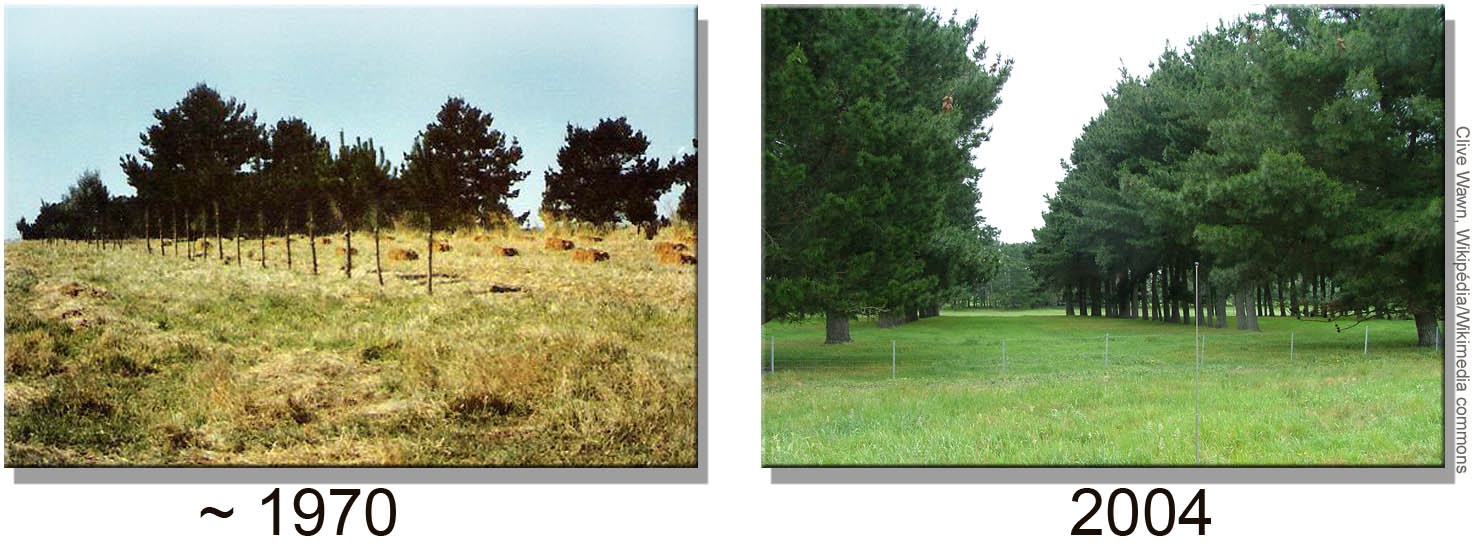
Silvopasture over the years

== See also ==
- Browsing (herbivory)
- Dehesa
- Field
- Meadow
- Transhumance
- Environmental impact of cattle
