= Jabugo =

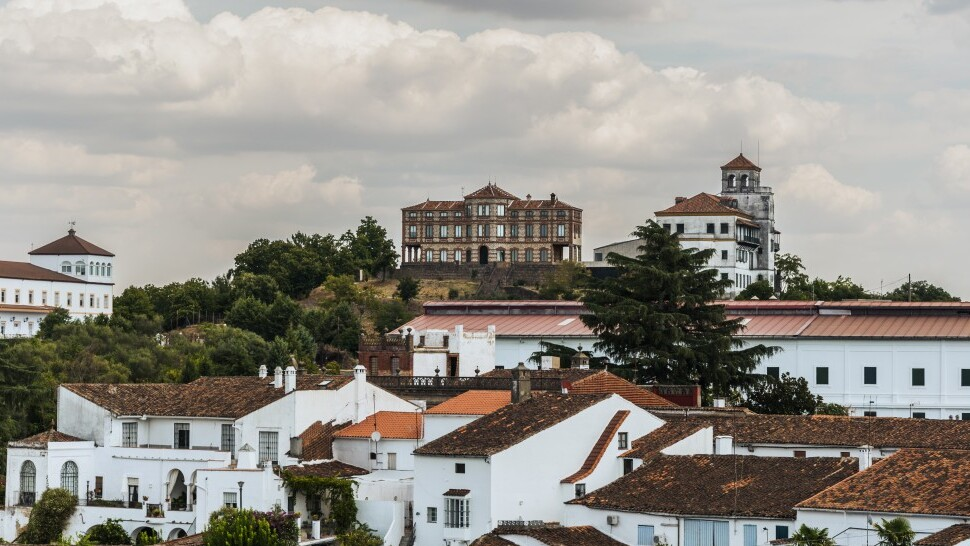

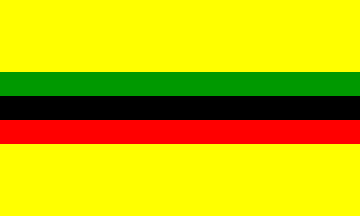
- Flag Coat of arms

- Location of Jabugo in Spain
- Coordinates: 37°55′N 6°44′W
- Country: Spain
- Autonomous community: Andalusia
- Province: Huelva

Area
  - Total: 25 km^{2} (9.7 sq mi)
- Elevation: 658 m (2,159 ft)

Population (2025-01-01)
  - Total: 2,183
  - Density: 87/km^{2} (230/sq mi)
- Time zone: UTC+1 (CET)
  - Summer (DST): UTC+2 (CEST)
- Website: http://www.jabugo.es/

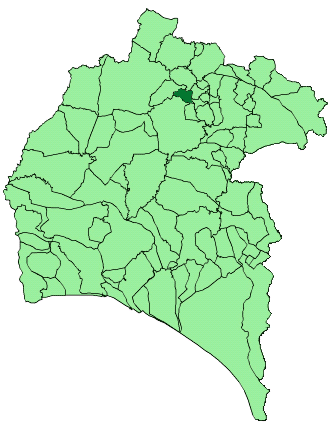
Map of Jabugo, Huelva

Jabugo (Spanish pronunciation: [xaˈβuɣo]) is a town and municipality located in the province of Huelva, Spain. According to the 2025 municipal register, it has a population of 2,183 inhabitants. The region is known for its signature ham, Jamón ibérico.

== See also ==
- List of municipalities in Huelva
