= Black Iberian pig =

Breed of pig

Iberian pig
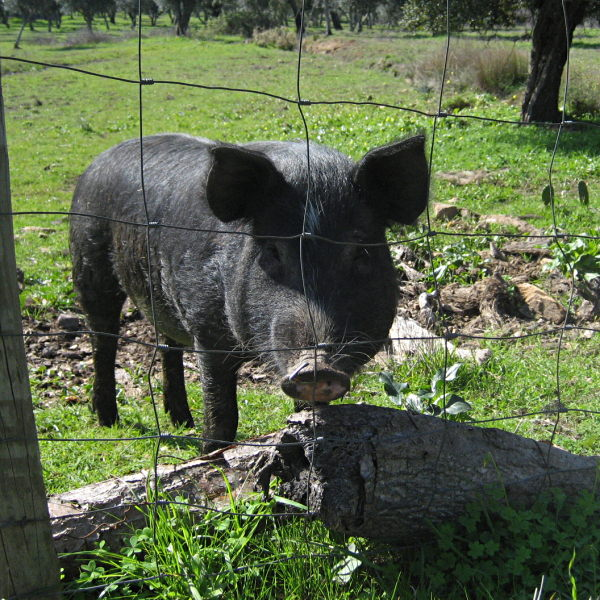
- Black pig being raised in the countryside near Évora, Alentejo, Portugal
- Country of origin: Iberian Peninsula

Traits

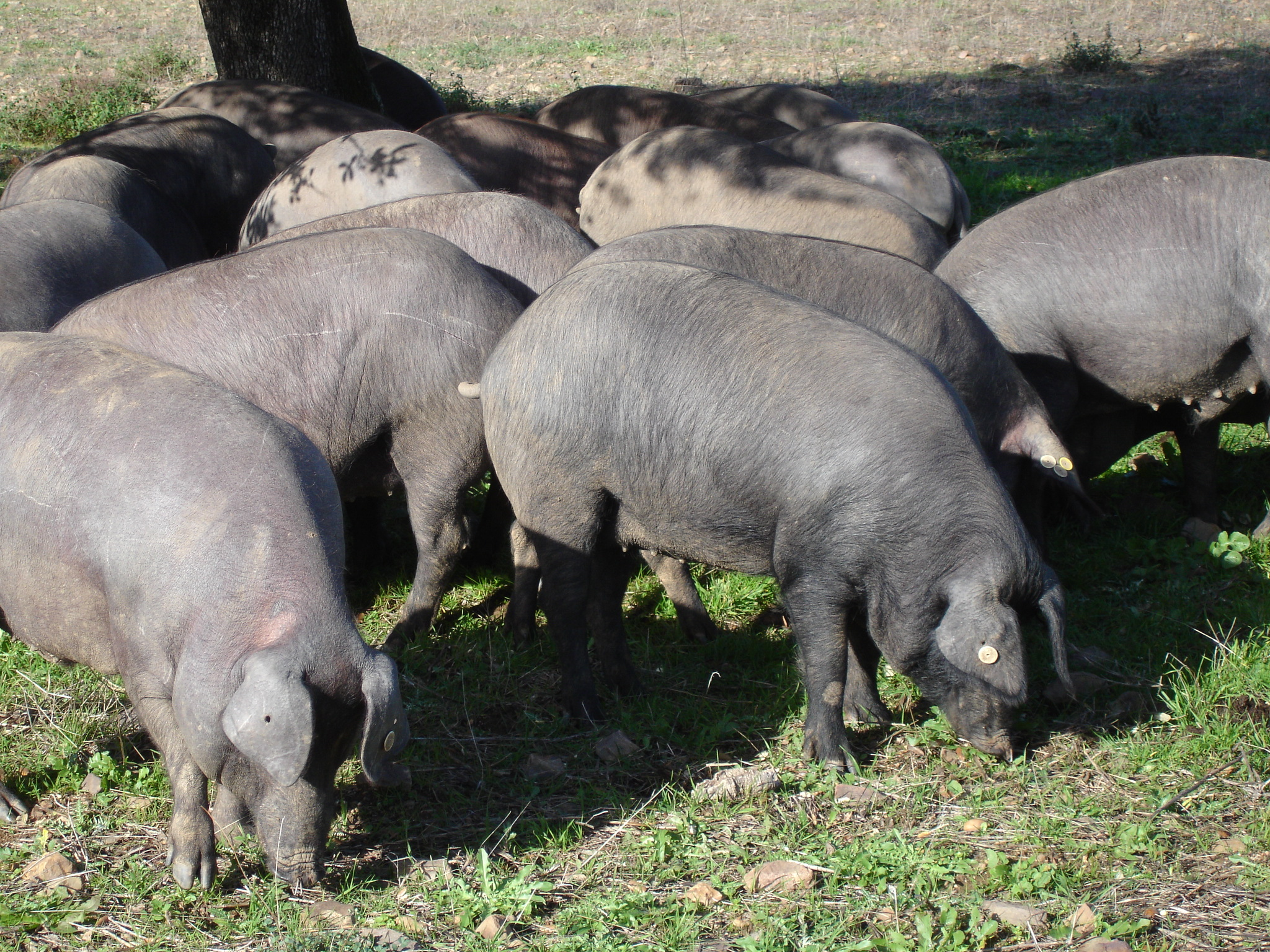
Iberian pigs in Extremadura, Spain

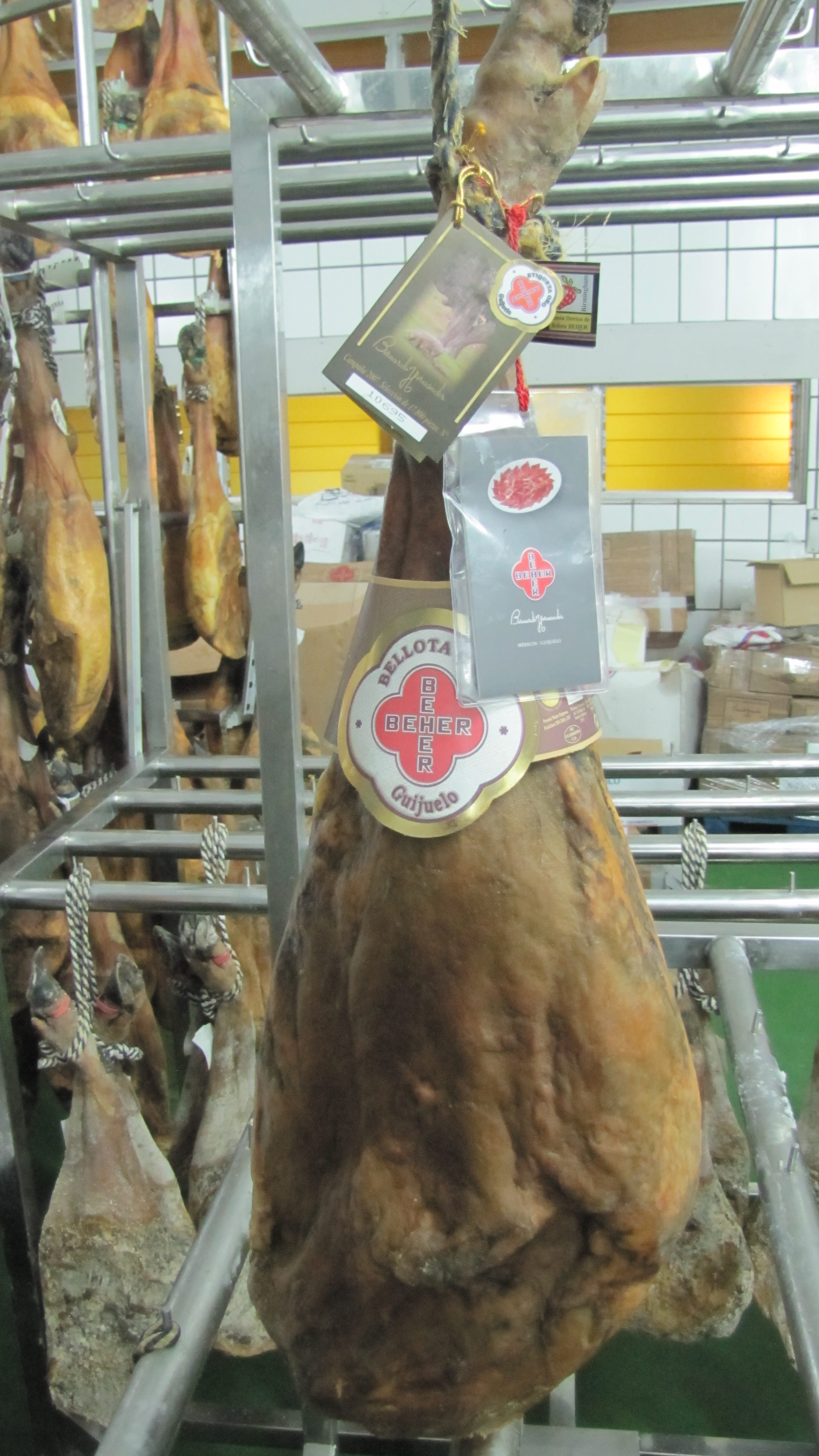
Jamón Ibérico, BEHER "Bellota Oro", was selected as "best ham in the world" in IFFA Delicat 2007, 2010 and 2013.

The Iberian pig, also known in Portugal as the Alentejo Pig, is a traditional breed of the domestic pig (Sus scrofa domesticus) that is native to the Iberian Peninsula. The Iberian pig, whose origins can probably be traced back to the Neolithic, when animal domestication started, is currently found in herds clustered in Spain and the central and southern part of Portugal.

The production of Iberian pig is deeply rooted to the Mediterranean ecosystem. It is a rare example in world swine production where the pig contributes so decisively to the preservation of the ecosystem. The Iberian breed is currently one of the few examples of a domesticated breed which has adapted to a pastoral setting where the land is particularly rich in natural resources, in this case acorns from the holm oak, gall oak and cork oak.

The numbers of the Iberian breed have been drastically reduced since 1960 due to several factors such as the outbreak of African swine fever and the lowered value of animal fats. In the past few years, however, the production of pigs of the Iberian type has increased to satisfy a renewed demand for top-quality meat and cured products. At the same time, breed specialisation has led to the disappearance of some ancestral varieties.

This traditional breed exhibits a good appetite and propensity to obesity, including a great capacity to accumulate intramuscular and epidermal fat. The high intramuscular fat is what produces the typical marbling; this, together with traditional feeding based on acorns, is what makes its ham taste so special. Iberian pigs are interesting from a human biomedical perspective because they present high feed intake and propensity to obesity, compatible with high values of serum leptin.

The Iberian pig can be either red or dark in colour, if black ranging from dark to grey, with little or no hair and a lean body, thus giving rise to the familiar name pata negra, or "black hoof". In traditional management, animals ranged freely in sparse oak forest (dehesa in Spain, montado in Portugal), they are constantly moving around and therefore burn more calories than confined pigs. This, in turn, produces the fine bones typical of this kind of jamón ibérico.

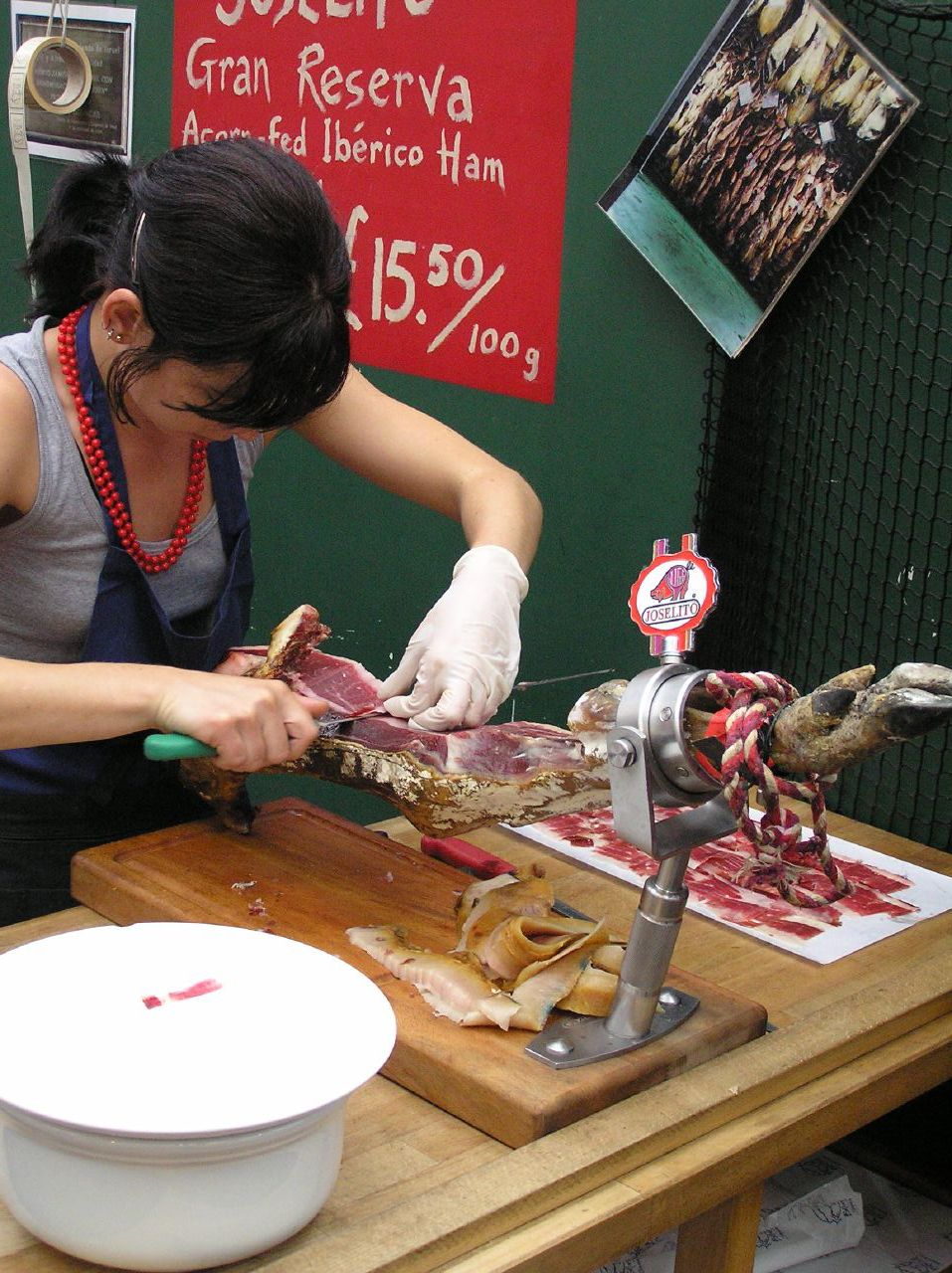
The ham known as Jamón Ibérico in Spain and Presunto de Porco Preto in Portugal, is an Iberian (Spanish/Portuguese) delicacy made from the acorn-fed black Iberian pig.

At least a hectare of healthy dehesa is needed to raise a single pig, and since the trees may be several hundred years old, the prospects for reforesting lost dehesa are slim at best. True dehesa is a richly diverse habitat with four different types of oak that are crucial in the production of prime-quality ham. The bulk of the acorn harvest comes from the holm oak (Quercus rotundifolia) from November to February, but the season would be too short without the earlier harvests of Pyrenean oak (Quercus pyrenaica) and Portuguese or gall oak (Quercus lusitanica), and the late cork oak (Quercus suber) season, which between them extend the acorn-production period from September almost to April.

== See also ==
- Presunto
- List of pig breeds
