= Jamón ibérico =

Type of cured pork leg product

Jamón ibérico Presunto ibérico
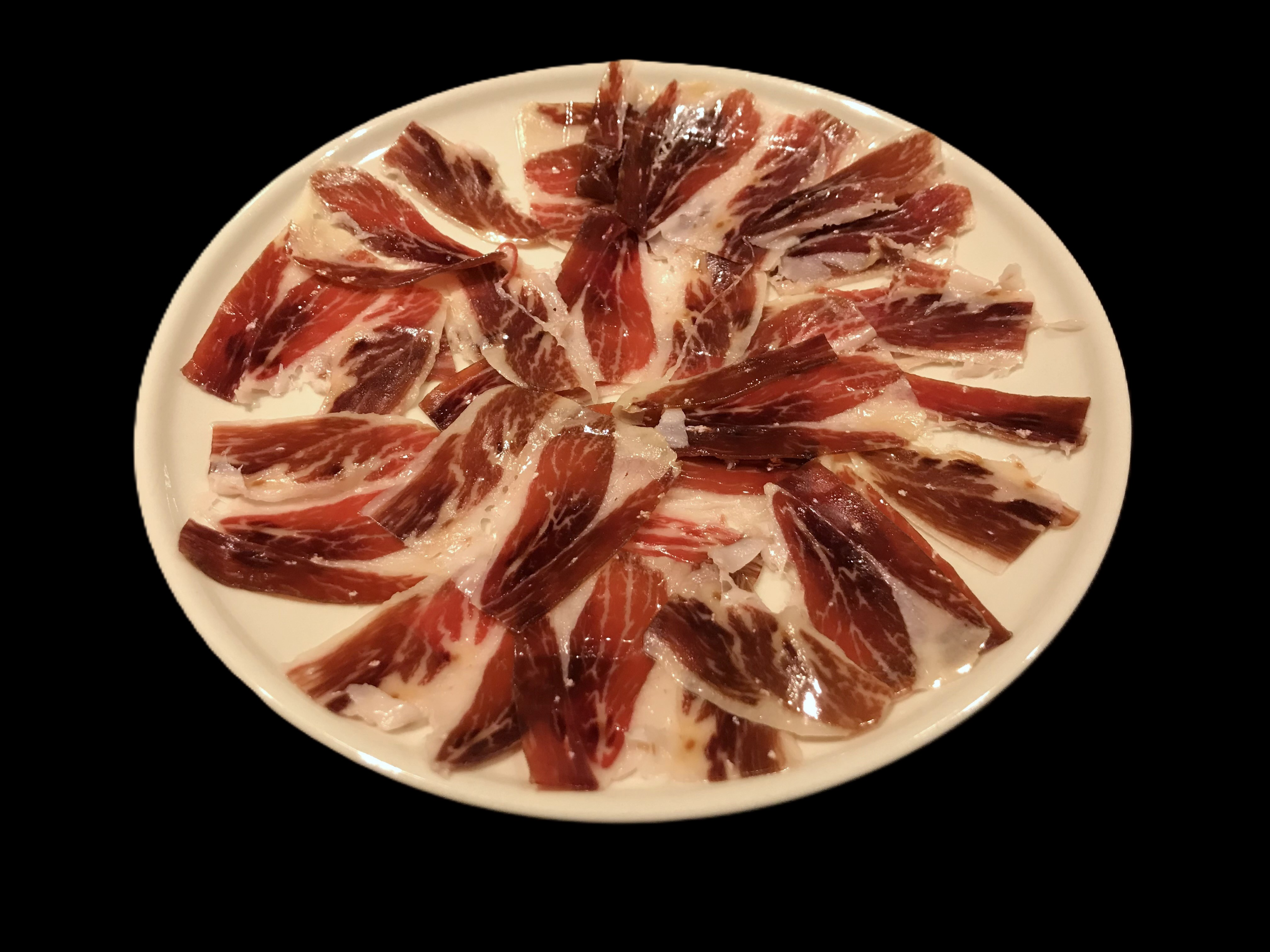
- A plate of jamón ibérico de bellota
- Alternative names: Pata negra, Jabugo
- Place of origin: Iberian Peninsula: Portugal; Spain
- Main ingredients: Ham
- Variations: Jamón serrano Presunto de Barrancos

Jamón ibérico (Spanish: [xaˈmon iˈβeɾiko]; Spanish for "Iberian ham"), known in Portuguese as presunto ibérico (Portuguese: [pɾɨˈzũtu iˈβɛɾiku]), is a variety of jamón or presunto, a type of cured leg of pork (primarily Black Iberian pigs) produced in Spain and Portugal, in the Iberian Peninsula. It is considered a staple of both Portuguese cuisine and Spanish cuisine.

== Description ==
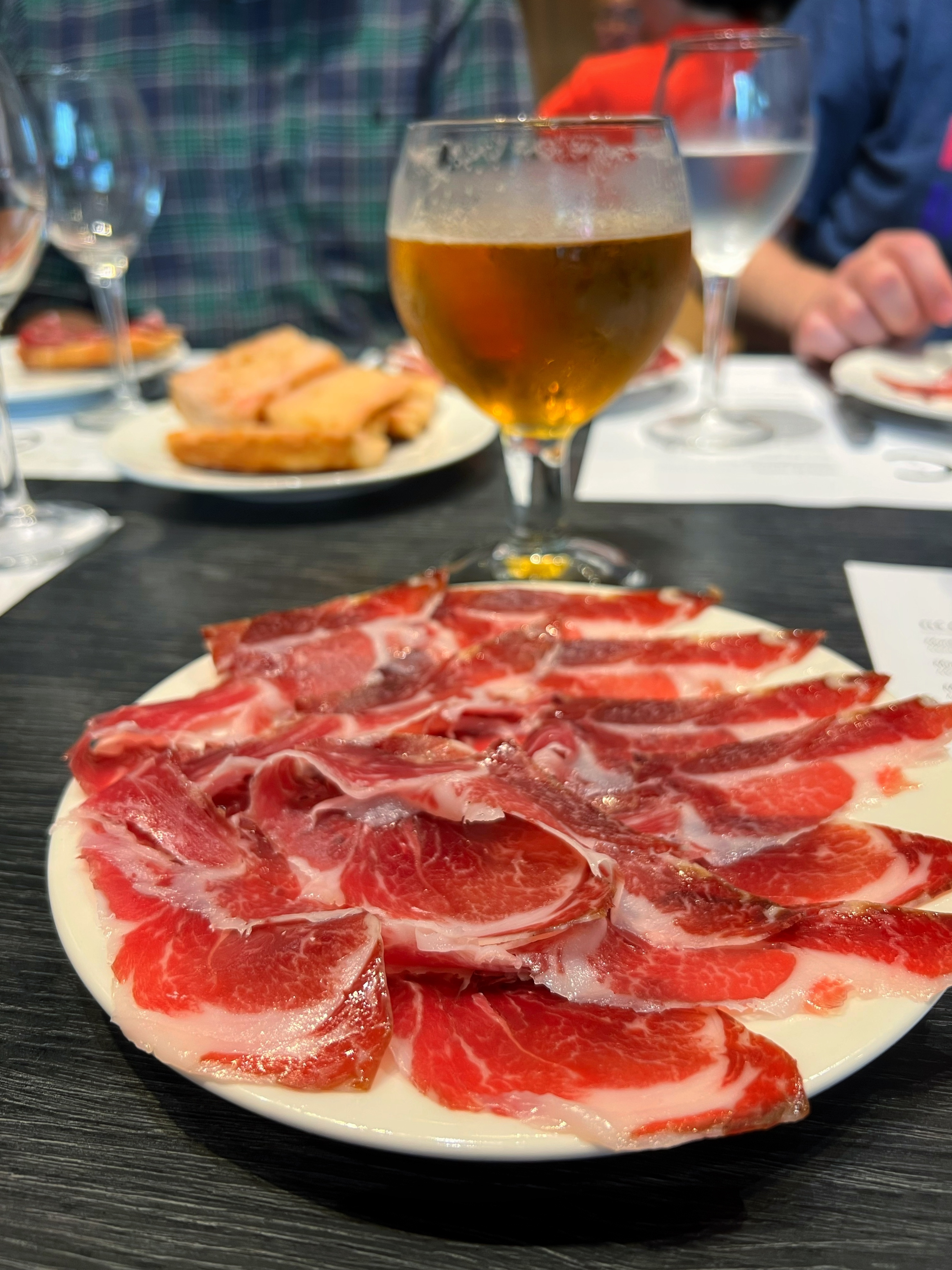
Platter of jamón ibérico with beer and pan con tomate

According to Spain's denominación de origen rules and current regulations on jamón, the dry-cured jamón ibérico must be made from either pure breed Black Iberian pigs or cross-bred pigs at least 50% Black Iberian mixed only with Duroc pigs, the same restriction as required to keep official ibérico denomination on any Spanish pork meat product.

Jamón ibérico, especially the one labeled de bellota, has a smooth texture, rich, savoury taste, and regular marbling. The fat content is relatively high compared to jamón serrano.

== Production ==
=== Location ===
The black Iberian pig lives primarily in the central and southwestern region of the Iberian Peninsula, which includes both Portugal and Spain. In Spain, the black Iberian pig is typically found in the provinces of Huelva, Córdoba, Cáceres, Badajoz, Salamanca, Ciudad Real, and Seville. In Portugal, the central and southern regions have an abundance of this breed, with a predilection for the Alentejo region. In Portugal, the black Iberian pig is commonly referred to as porco preto ibérico or porco alentejano. The black Iberian pig is ingrained in the local Portuguese culture and tradition, with annual festivals in their honor, such as the Feira do Porco Preto, an annual festival in the region of Ourique.

=== Process ===
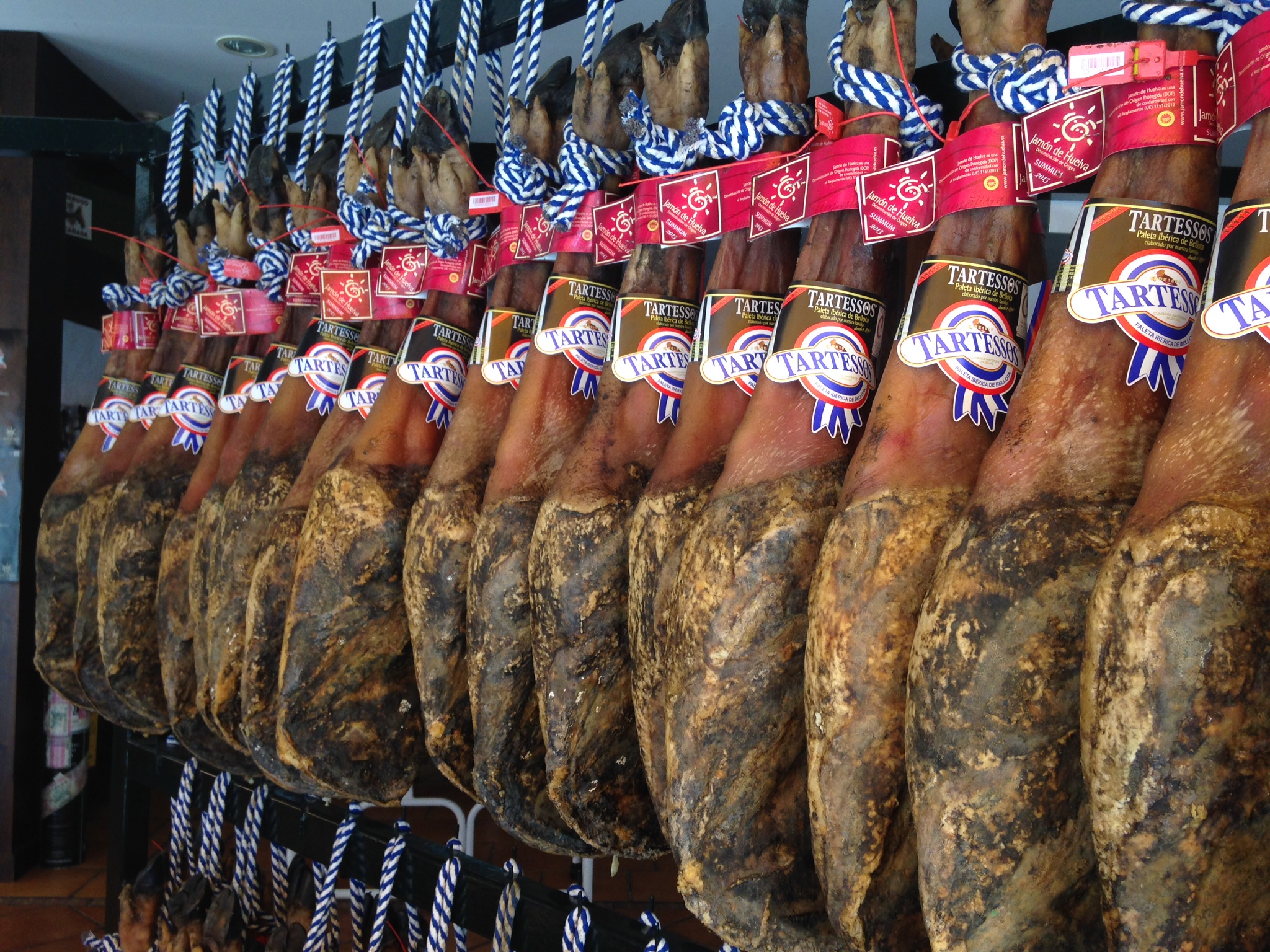
Jamón ibérico de Jabugo

Immediately after weaning, the piglets are fattened on barley and maize for several weeks. The pigs are then allowed to roam in pasture and oak groves known as dehesa to feed naturally on grass, herbs, acorns, chestnuts, and roots, until the slaughtering time approaches. At that point, the diet may be strictly limited to chestnuts or acorns for the best-quality jamón ibérico, or maybe a mix of acorns and commercial feed for lesser qualities.

The hams from the slaughtered pigs are salted and left to begin drying for two weeks, after which they are rinsed and left to dry for another four to six weeks. The curing process then takes at least twelve months, although some producers cure their jamones ibéricos for up to 48 months. During the curing process the meat is dried in salt, which helps to prevent the build-up of harmful organisms, and then is hung to be exposed to the elements, producing an exterior layer of mold which helps to protect the meat inside.

=== Preservation and storage ===
Normally, jamón is sold either sliced and vacuum-packed or as a whole leg. Vacuum-packed jamón may last up to 100 days at room temperature because the packaging seals out oxygen and slows the aging process. A whole leg does not last as long. If the jamón is regularly cut and covered with clingfilm or cheesecloth, an opened leg may last for three months.

Freezing is not recommended, since it damages the fibers in jamón and alters flavours.

== Commercial grading and labeling ==
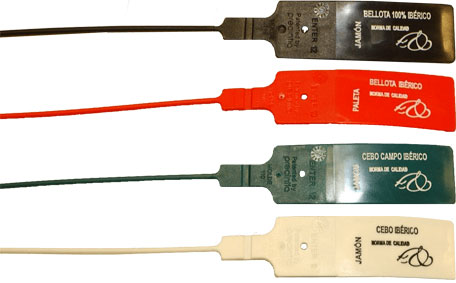
Regulatory ibérico tags, in order of quality

The hams are labeled according to the pigs' diet and the percentage of the pigs' Iberian ancestry, with an acorn diet and pure-bred Iberians being most desirable. The current labeling system, based on a series of color-coded labels, was phased in starting in January 2014.

- The finest grade is called jamón ibérico de bellota (acorn). This ham is from free-range pigs that roam oak forests (called dehesas) along the border between Spain and Portugal and eat only acorns during this last period. The exercise and diet have a significant effect on the flavor of the meat; the ham is cured for 36 months. This grade is subdivided into:
  - Black-label – jamón 100% ibérico de bellota, produced from pure-bred Iberian pigs
  - Red-label – jamón ibérico de bellota, produced from free-range pigs that are not pure-bred. The percentage of Iberian ancestry in the animal must be specified on the label. It can be either 75% or 50% pure ibérico pig breed.
- The next grade is Green label – jamón ibérico cebo de campo. This ham is from pigs that are pastured and fed a combination of acorns and grain. It can be either 100%, 75% or 50% pure ibérico pig breed.
- The fourth type is White label – jamón ibérico de cebo, or simply, jamón ibérico. This ham is from pigs that are fed only grain. The ham is cured for 24 months. It can be either 100%, 75% or 50% pure ibérico pig breed.

Some notes:

- As of 2014, the term pata negra refers exclusively to the black-label grade jamón ibérico.
- The word puro (pure, referring to the breed) can be added to the previous qualities when both the father and mother of the slaughtered animal are of pure breed and duly registered on the pedigree books held by official breeders.
- Images of acorns and dehesas on product labels are restricted to hams that qualify as bellota.
- The current labeling system also applies to paleta (front legs, with jamón coming from the hind leg) and caña de lomo (loin) cuts from Iberian pigs.

=== Pata negra ===
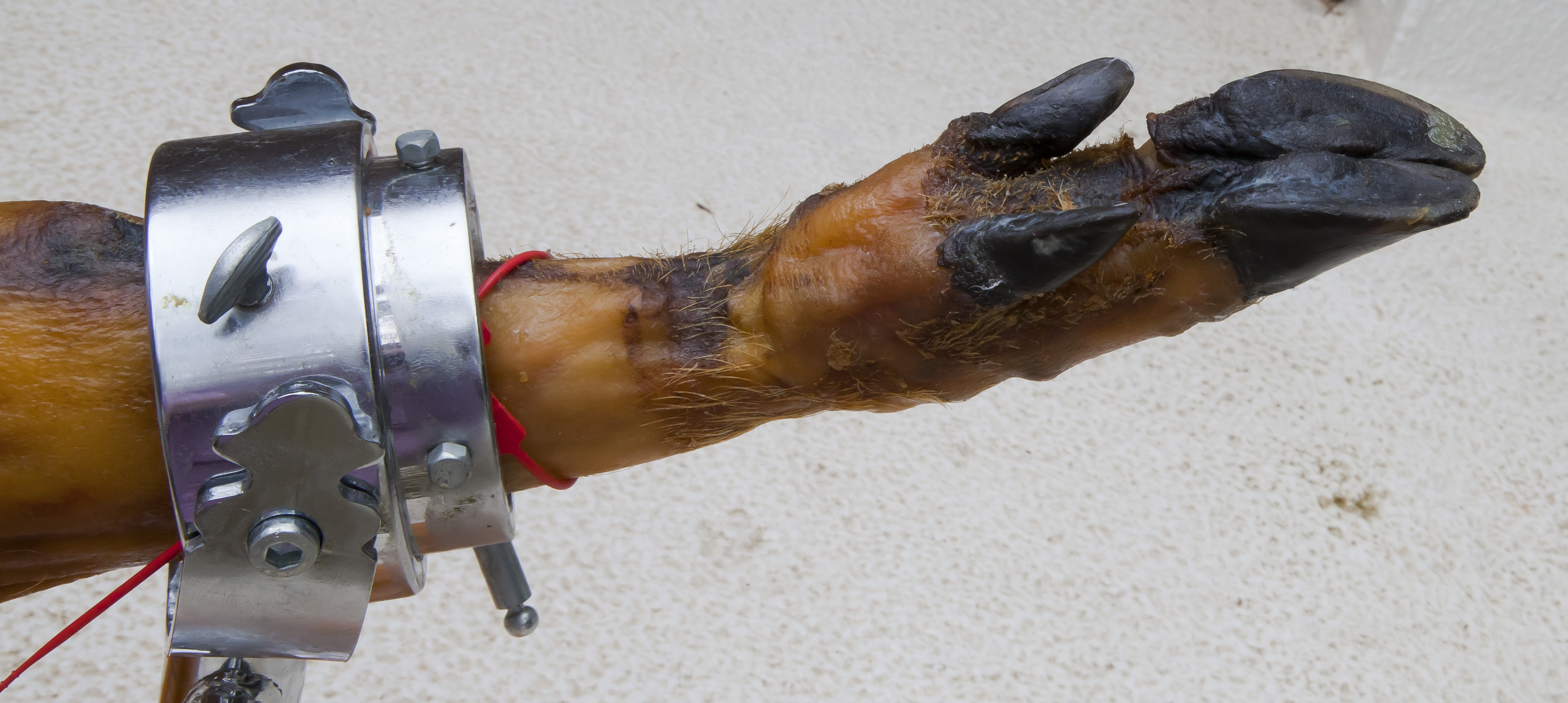
Presunto pata negra, Setúbal

Meaning literally 'black foot or paw', pata negra is a commercial label for jamón ibérico. In colloquial Spanish and popular culture, it is used as a superlative or synonym of the best.

It referred to the color of the pigs' hoof, which are white or fair-colored in most traditional and commercial pork breeds in Spain, but always black in the Black Iberian breed.

The term used to be liberally applied in both Spanish and Portuguese, leading to quality and markets disputes, since the term was used interchangeably both as "great quality jamón" (of any breed) and ibérico jamón (of any quality). Alongside reputable pata negra producers, there were plenty of dubious producers using the term in their labeling.

Jamón has also been sold unlabeled in small towns and unpretentious establishments all around rural Spain. While, as a general rule, a black hoof should indicate an ibérico ham, the ancestry could be exceedingly cross-bred or untraceable, and also there were cases of ham sourced from rare breeds with dark hoofs, and even manually darkened hoofs.

Modern regulations allow the use of the wording pata negra only for black label jamón sourced from acorn-fed pure-bred Black Iberian pork.

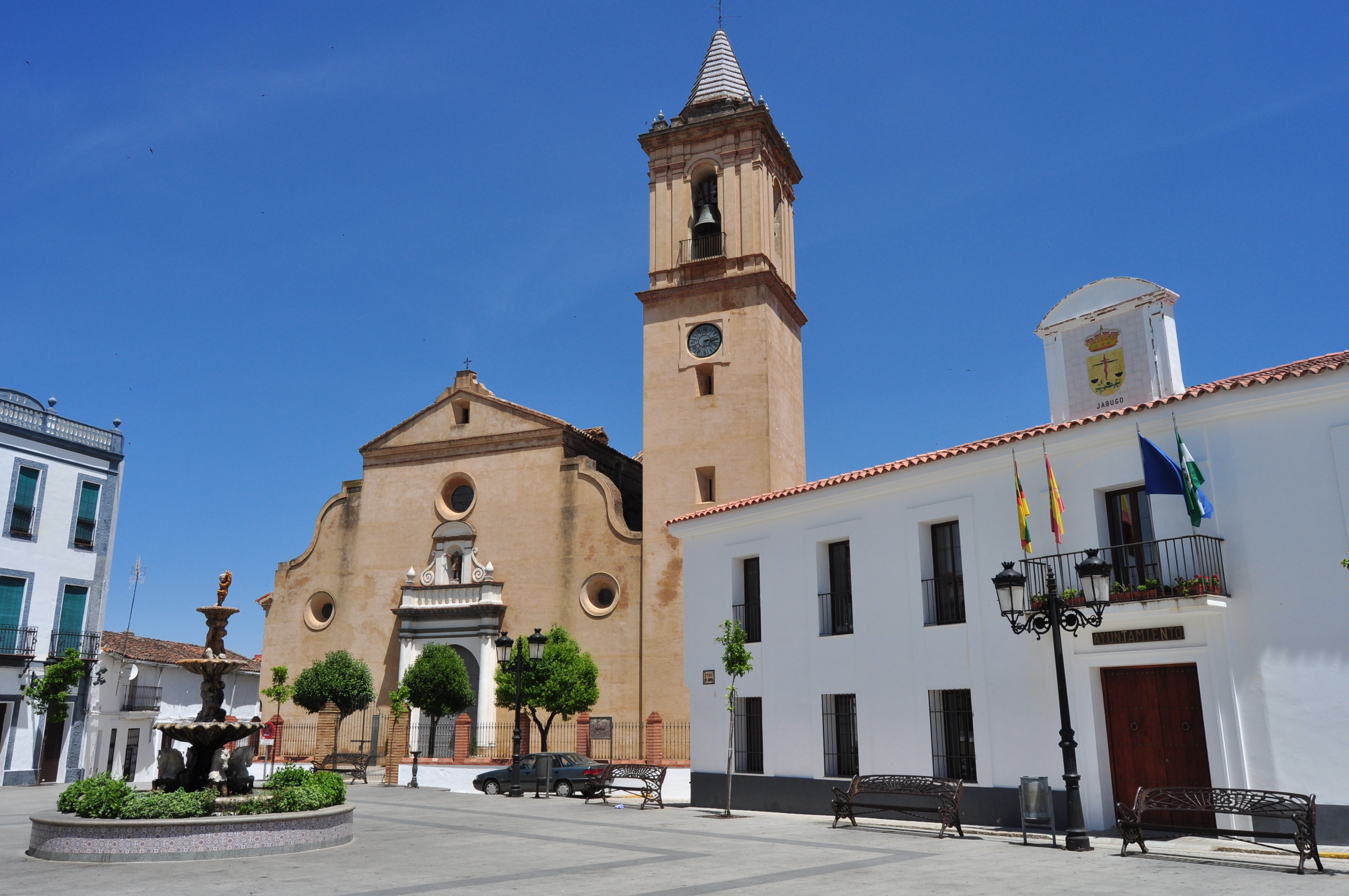
The locality of Jabugo is entirely dedicated to jamón production.

== Notable producers and protected designations ==
Notable producers of Ibérico are recognized by both the regulatory bodies of Spain, and the European Union. Their designations are legally protected. Some of them include:

- DOP Guijuelo – pigs of this denomination are typically raised on the foothills of the sierras of Gredos and Béjar, within the autonomous communities of Castile and León and Extremadura, as well as in Andalusia and Castile-La Mancha. The protected zone is constituted by 77 municipalities of the southeast of the province of Salamanca, the head town being Guijuelo itself. 60% of the production of jamón ibérico belongs to the DO Jamón de Guijuelo.
- DOP Jabugo, province of Huelva – jamón cured in the Sierra de Aracena and Picos de Aroche Natural Park, in the towns of Cumbres Mayores, Cortegana, Jabugo, Encinasola, Galaroza, etc., which make up the production zone of the denominación de origen protegida Jabugo. The entire town of Jabugo is devoted to the production of jamón ibérico, the town's main square being called La plaza del Jamón.
- DOP Dehesa de Extremadura – the production area is located in the pastures of cork oaks and evergreen oaks in the province of Cáceres and the province of Badajoz. Of the total dehesa area of the peninsula, Extremadura has about one million hectares.
- DOP Los Pedroches, province of Córdoba – the external shape is elongated, stylized, profiled by the so-called cut in V. Keep the leg and the hoof for easy identification. Characteristic color of the rose to the red-purple and appearance to the cut with infiltrated fat in the muscular mass.

== Consumption and popularity ==
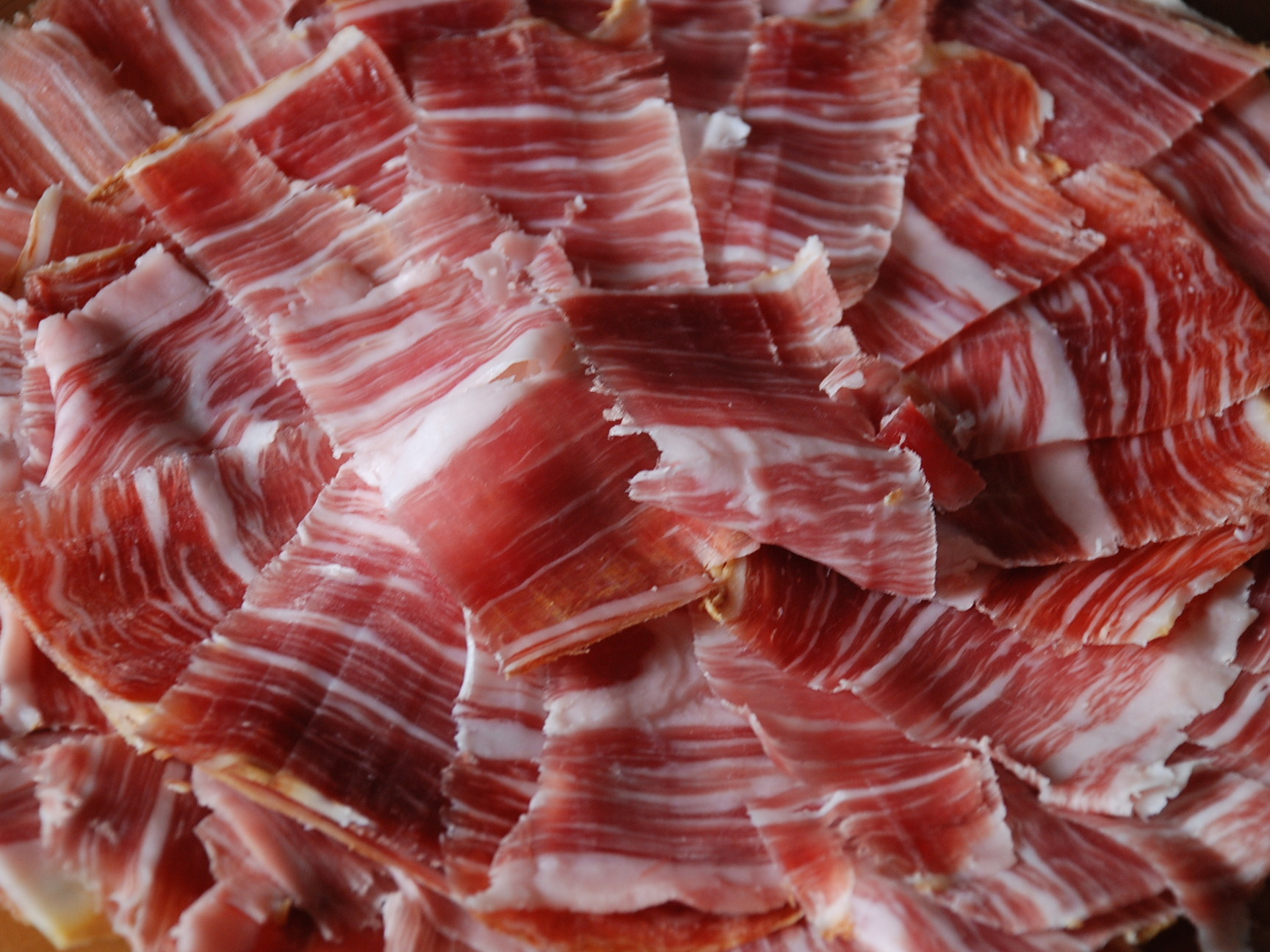
Jamón de Guijuelo

Ibérico encompasses some of the most expensive ham produced in the world, and its fatty marbled texture has made it very popular as a delicacy, with a hard-to-fulfill global demand comparable to that of Kobe beef.

Around 13,000 metric tons (14,000 short tons) of jamón ibérico and associated by-products were consumed in Spain in 2017, leading to an estimated 4 billion euros in retail sales. The demand keeps growing while the availability is stagnated, as the production is maxing out to ensure quality. This is leading to a rise in the price of jamón ibérico, which is expected to double between 2017 and 2021. However, in 2020, sales in Spain fell 35–40% because of the COVID-19 pandemic in Spain. Bars and restaurants, one of the outlets for the product, were closed or restricted. Wedding celebrations also were postponed or had minimal attendance. Since jamón takes years from slaughter to sale, producers had to lower prices or go online to clear their stocks.

Since jamón ibérico production and export is limited, the buyer should beware and not fall victim to retail or wholesale bait-and-switch or similar tactics seen in olive oil export fraud, since it has been estimated that a sizable portion of both local market and exports are not actually ibérico.

=== Availability in the United States ===
Prior to 2005, only pork raised and slaughtered outside Spain was allowed to be processed in Spain for export to the United States, due to fear of swine fever. In 2005, the first slaughterhouse in Spain was approved by the US Department of Agriculture to produce ibérico products for export to the US.

The first jamones ibéricos were released for sale in the US in December 2007, with the bellota ones following in July 2008.

== See also ==
Media related to Iberico ham at Wikimedia Commons

- Spanish cuisine
- Portuguese cuisine
- List of hams
- List of dried foods
- Curing (food preservation)
- Jamón serrano
