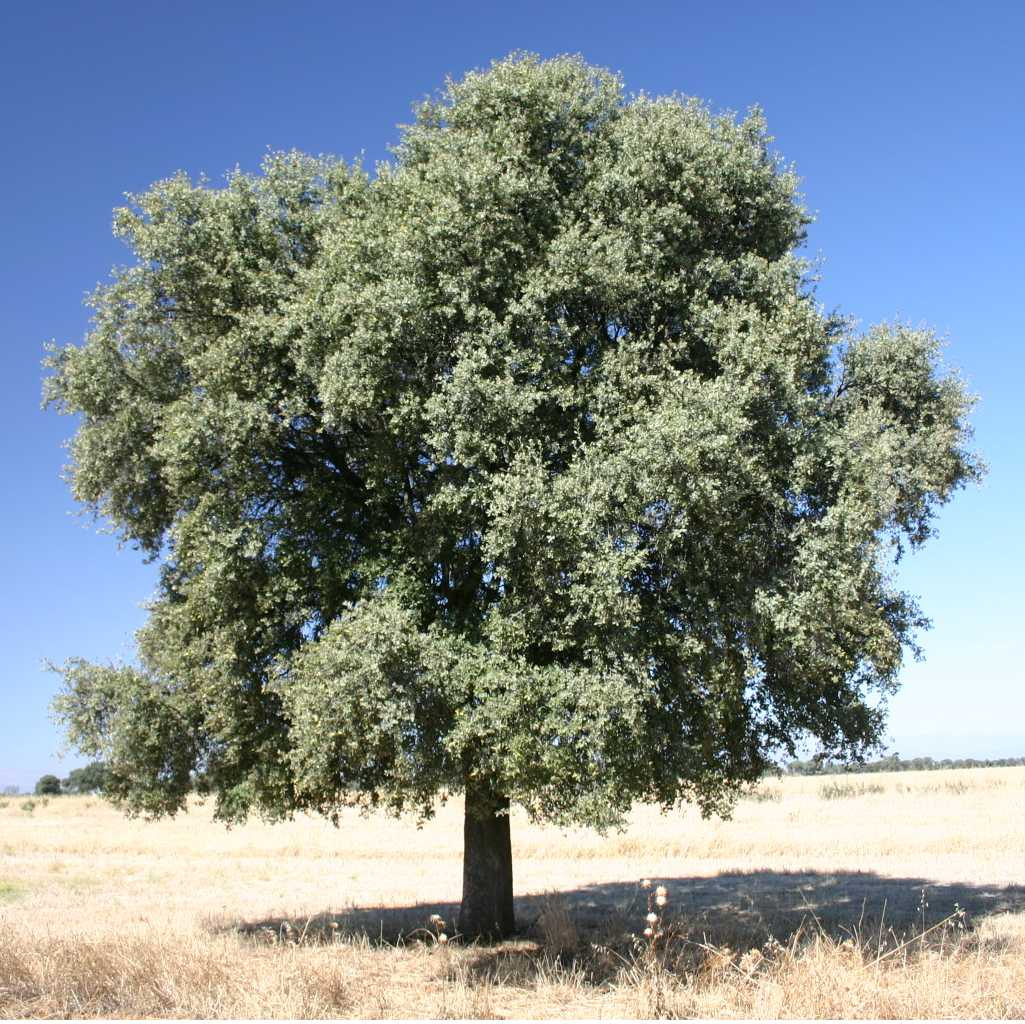

Conservation status
- Least Concern (IUCN 3.1)

Scientific classification
- Kingdom: Plantae
- Clade: Tracheophytes
- Clade: Angiosperms
- Clade: Eudicots
- Clade: Rosids
- Order: Fagales
- Family: Fagaceae
- Genus: Quercus
- Subgenus: Quercus subg. Cerris
- Section: Quercus sect. Ilex
- Species: Q. rotundifolia

Binomial name
- Quercus rotundifolia Lam.
- Species' distribution: Q. rotundifolia (pink), Q. ilex (green)

Synonyms
- Quercus ilex L. subsp. ballota (Desf.) Samp.; Quercus ilex subsp. rotundifolia (Lam.) O.Schwarz ex Tab.Morais

= Quercus rotundifolia =

Species of oak tree

The Iberian holm oak (Quercus rotundifolia) is an evergreen oak native to the western Mediterranean region, with the majority of the population in the Iberian Peninsula and minor populations in Northwest Africa. The species was first described by Jean-Baptiste Lamarck in 1785. It is the typical species of the Iberian dehesa or montado, where its sweet-astringent acorns are a source of food for livestock, particularly the Iberian pig. Its acorns have also been used for human nourishment since the Neolithic era (7,000 BC). It is placed in section Ilex. Some authors described it as a subspecies of Quercus ilex.

== Description ==
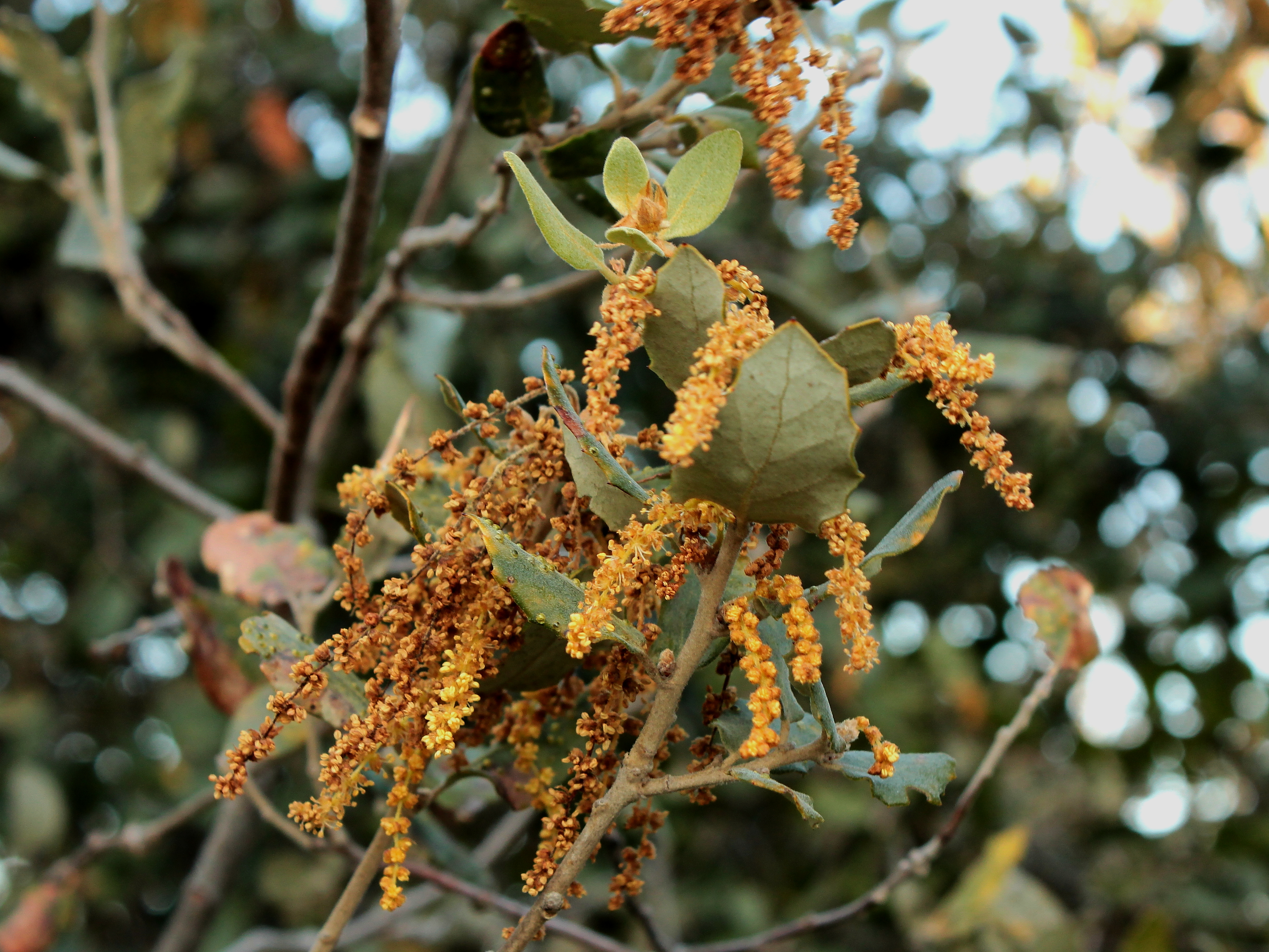
Inflorescence

Quercus rotundifolia is a medium to large tree, usually 8–12 m (26–39 ft) in height, but can reach up to 15 m (49 ft) with a large, dense, rounded canopy. It has small, leathery, dark-green leaves with a glaucous, densely pubescent underside usually suborbicular to elliptical or lanceolate and are generally spiny to dentate on a younger tree. It has a semi-hemispheric cupule.

It flowers from February to April. Seedlings will start flowering at about eight years old, but they will not start producing acorns until 15 to 20 years old, although trees in humid, good quality soils can start production as early as 10 years. The acorns ripen in autumn, about six months after pollination.

It is a resilient tree that can survive temperatures below −20 °C (−4 °F), and that on occasion reach 47 °C (117 °F).

As opposed to Quercus ilex, its acorns have a very low level of bitterness tannins and so are generally sweet and a good energy source for livestock.

== Distribution and habitat ==
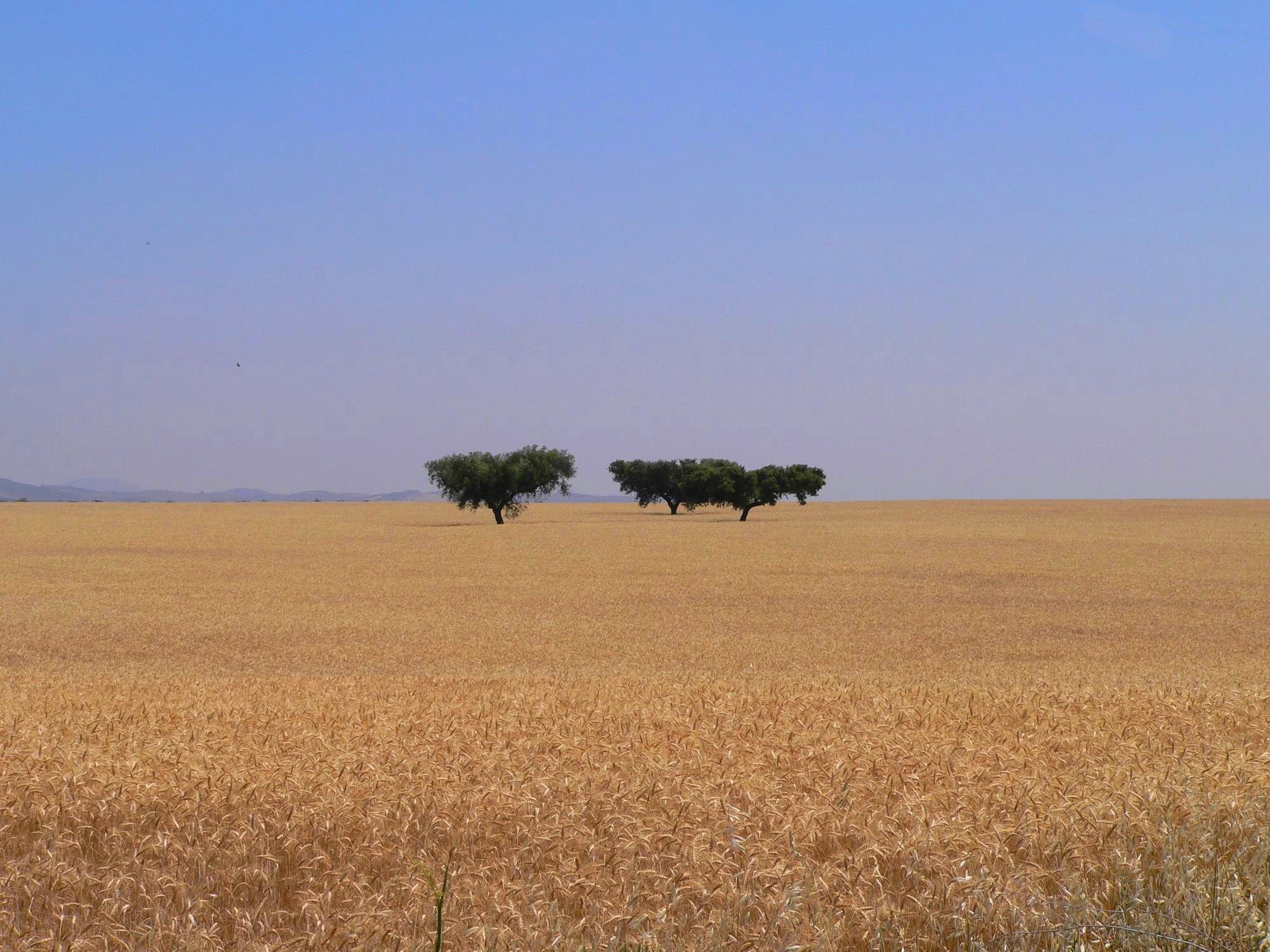
The tree is often seen on dehesa biomes typical of Alentejo (seen here) and Extremadura.

Quercus rotundifolia is native to most of the Iberian Peninsula (Portugal and Spain), but is also distributed throughout Morocco, especially in the Atlas Mountains, Algeria, Tunisia, southern France (Languedoc-Roussillon) and the Balearic Islands. It is present in continental, sub-continental or littoral Mediterranean areas but always in climatic conditions determined by a fairly hot and dry summer, which excludes the wet, oceanic influenced climate of Green Spain and northwest Portugal, but requires wet winters as the tree is absent from arid climates and those with no real wet months like southeast Spain. It grows in a variety of soils and is indifferent to variations in edaphic conditions, persisting in soils with pH from six to eight. The tree is also associated in Iberian holm oak/Atlas cedar forests of the Atlas Mountains. In Morocco, some of these mixed forests are habitat to the endangered Barbary macaque.

The tree inhabits dense oak forests, open oak forests and dehesa ecosystems, from sea level up to 1,900 m (6,200 ft) a.s.l. It can live in all altitudes in Portugal, switching with Quercus suber. The grasses and herbs beneath it support low-density mixed animal grazing during wetter season(s) and, when the grasses die down in summer, the acorns from the oak trees (at densities of 30 to 50 trees per hectare), plus oak foliage and some retained crops support the animals until the grasses return. It can tolerate frost and short periods of light snow.

== Threats ==
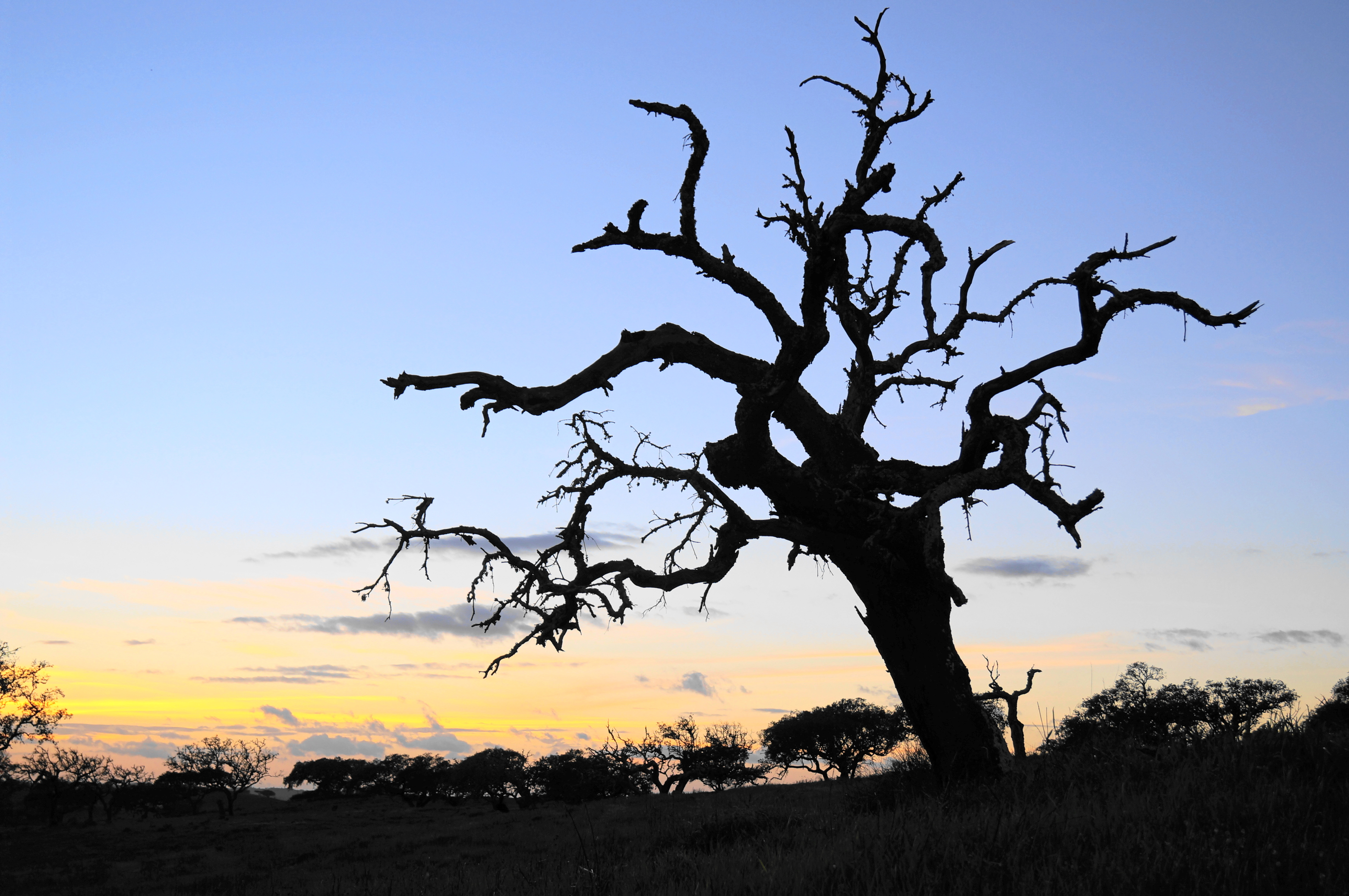
Dead Iberian holm oak, Mértola

The species is threatened by the destruction of its habitat for agriculture, vineyards and pine or eucalyptus plantations. Like other perennial oaks in the Iberian Peninsula, Quercus rotundifolia is also affected by Phytophthora cinnamomi which is becoming more dangerous due to the increased frequency and duration of droughts associated with climate change and, especially in Portugal, a decline for the taxa has been reported. The tree is also affected by wildfires, though it regenerates well from resprouts. The leaves are eaten by case moth caterpillars, but the tree is not particularly threatened by them. In New Zealand, the caterpillar of the puriri moth has also been observed to feed on the tree's bark. The tree is notably resistant to honey fungus.

The Iberian holm oak, along with the cork oak, is a protected tree by law in Portugal.

== Use ==
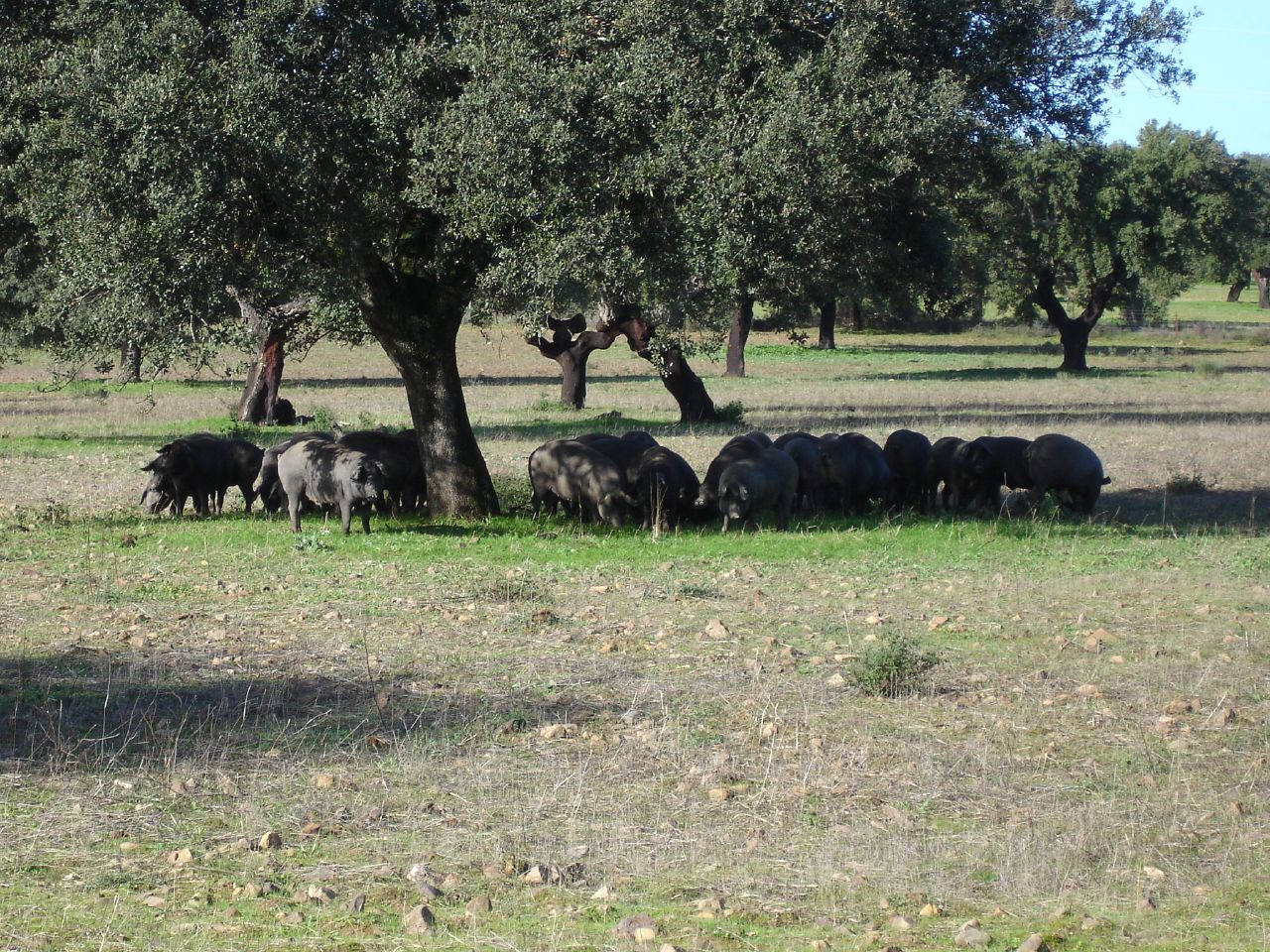
Black Iberian pigs foraging on Q. rotundifolia

The Iberian holm oak's wood is traditionally used to make charcoal. The acorns can be consumed both by animals and humans. The bark is rich in tannin components for traditional medicinal uses. Quercus rotundifolia is also used as a host plant for the production of both the black truffle (Tuber melanosporum) and the summer truffle (Tuber aestivum var aestivum).

The tree's acorns have been used by humans since the Neolithic era. The inhabitants of the southern Iberian Peninsula 9,000 years ago collected acorns of Q. rotundifolia in autumn (November), gently toasted them in order to preserve them, ground them in granite mills, and consumed the flour in soups or breads.

== Notable trees ==
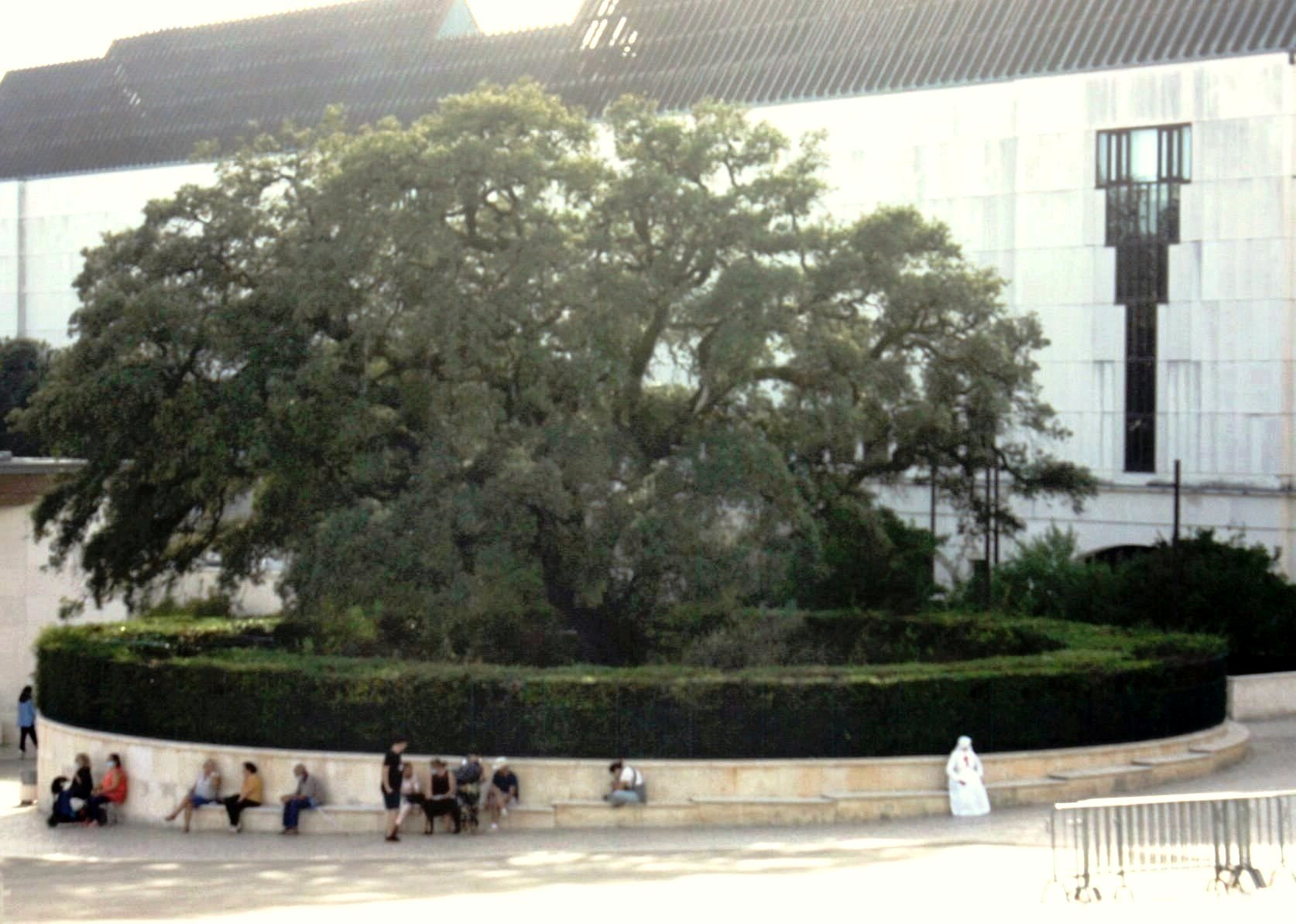
The Iberian holm oak in the Sanctuary of Fátima is a tree of public interest in Portugal.

An apparition of the Blessed Virgin Mary over a Quercus rotundifolia was reported by Francisco and Jacinta Marto and Lúcia dos Santos at Fátima in 1916 and 1917. The small tree has since disappeared and its pieces are now relics, but other Quercus rotundifolia near the site persist, one of them being a tree of public interest.

== Gallery ==
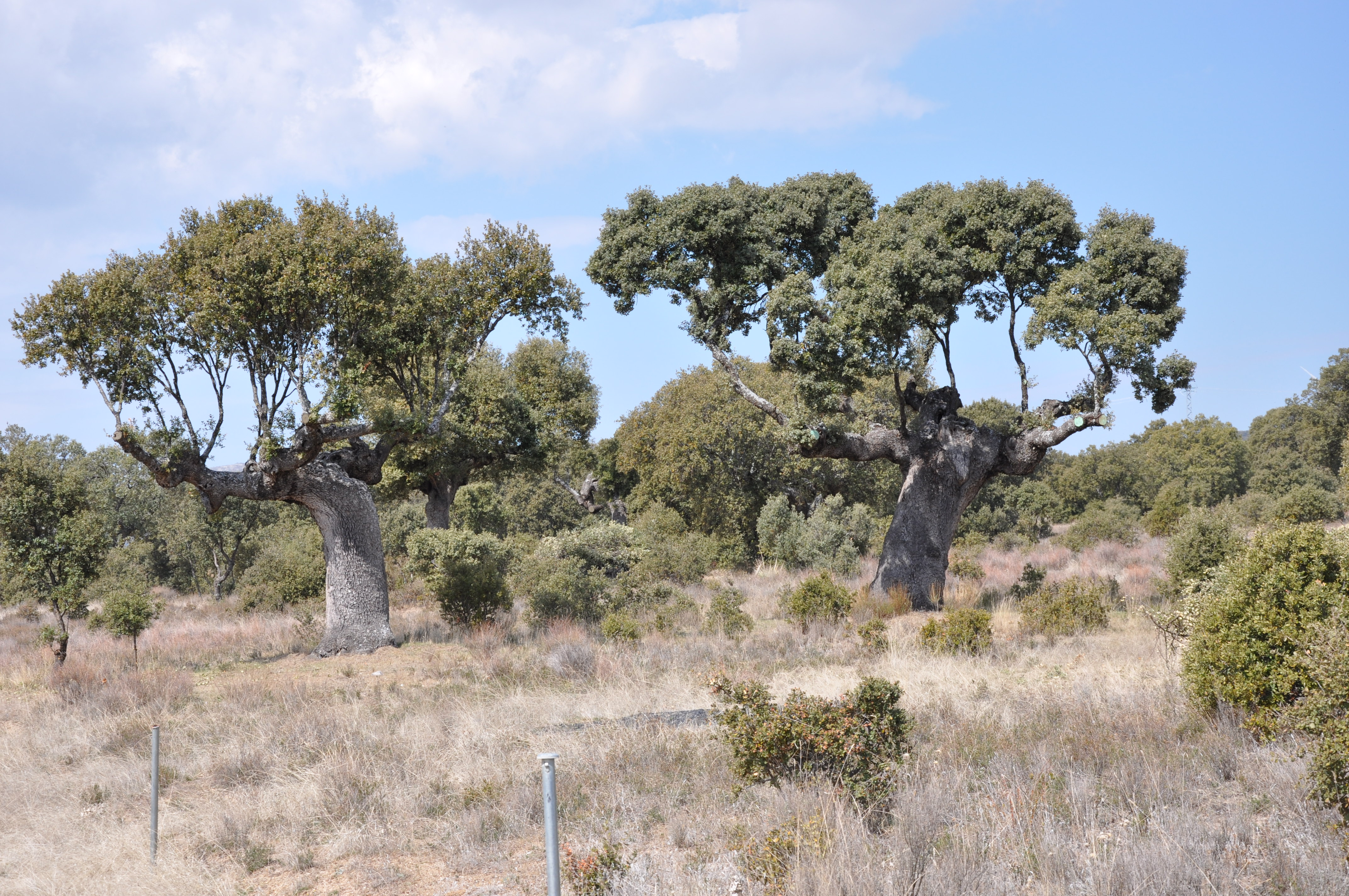
Large oaks in La Torre

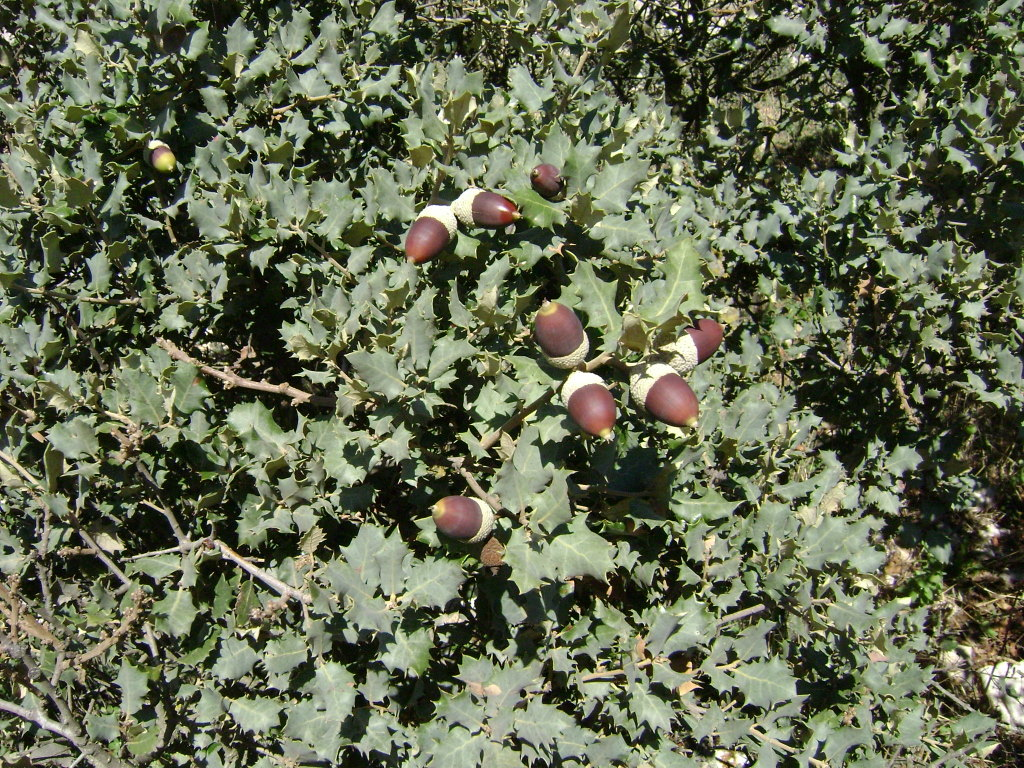
Acorns

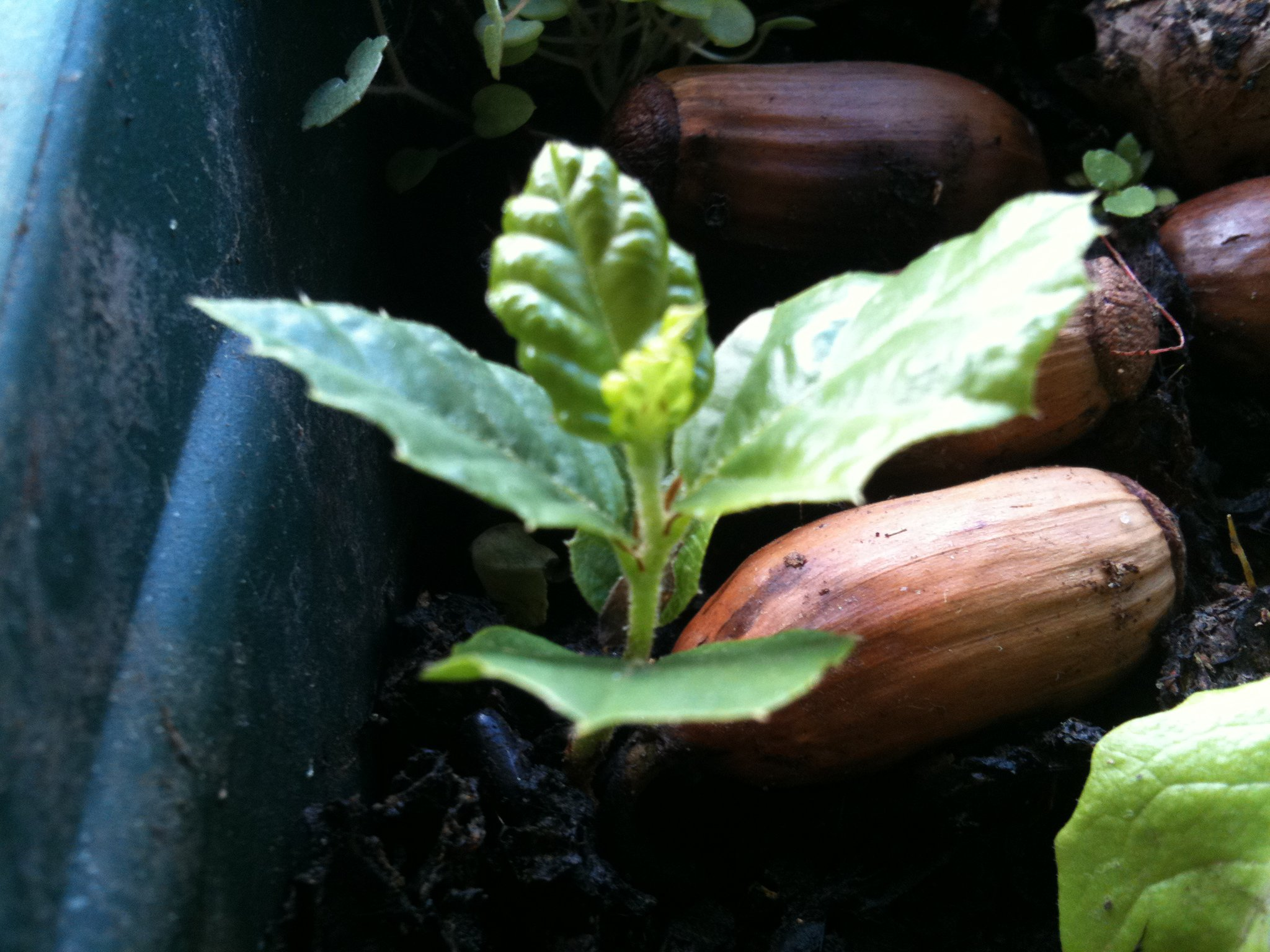
Q. rotundifolia germinating

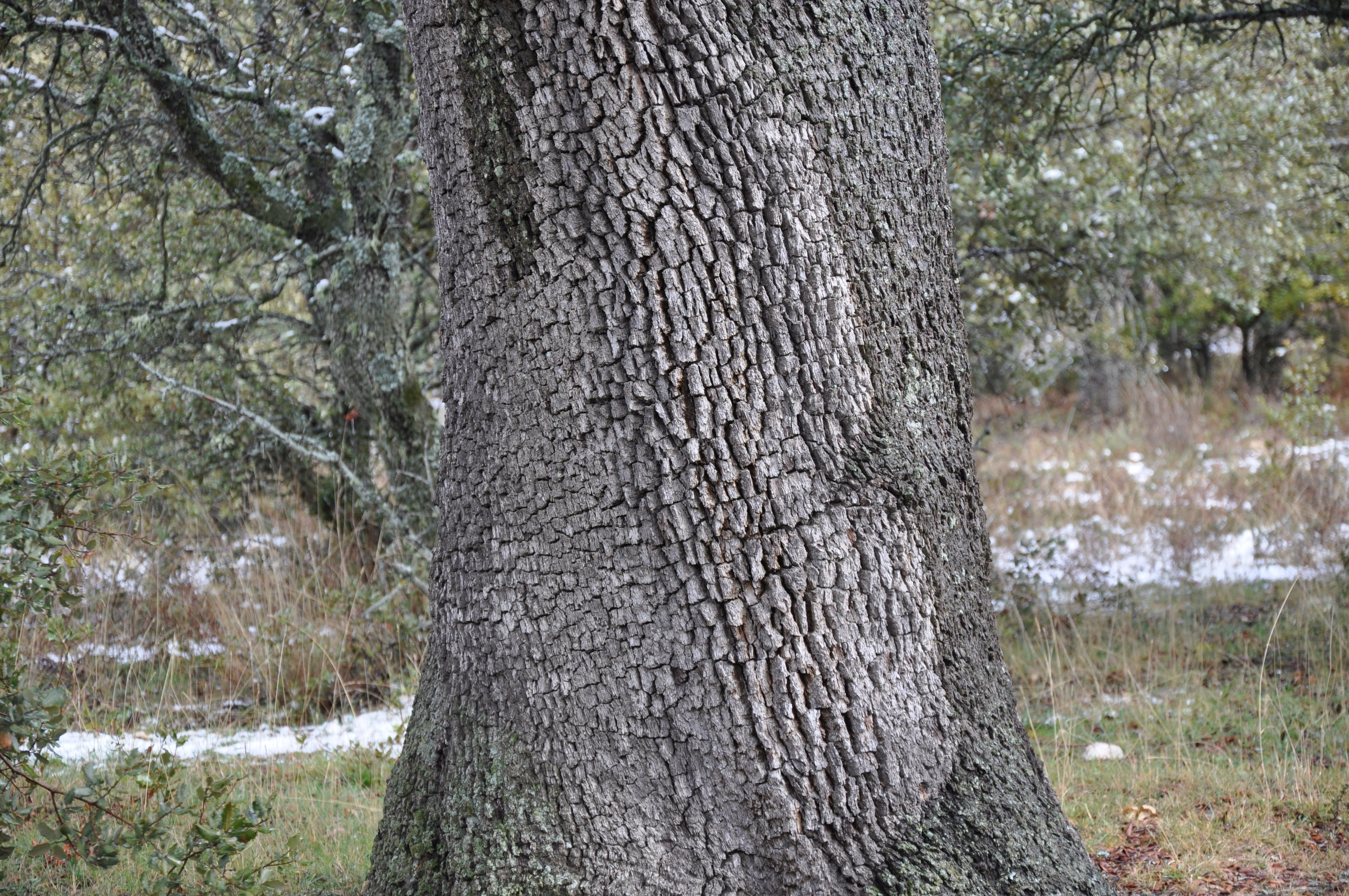
Rough aspect of the trunk, commonly seen in older trees

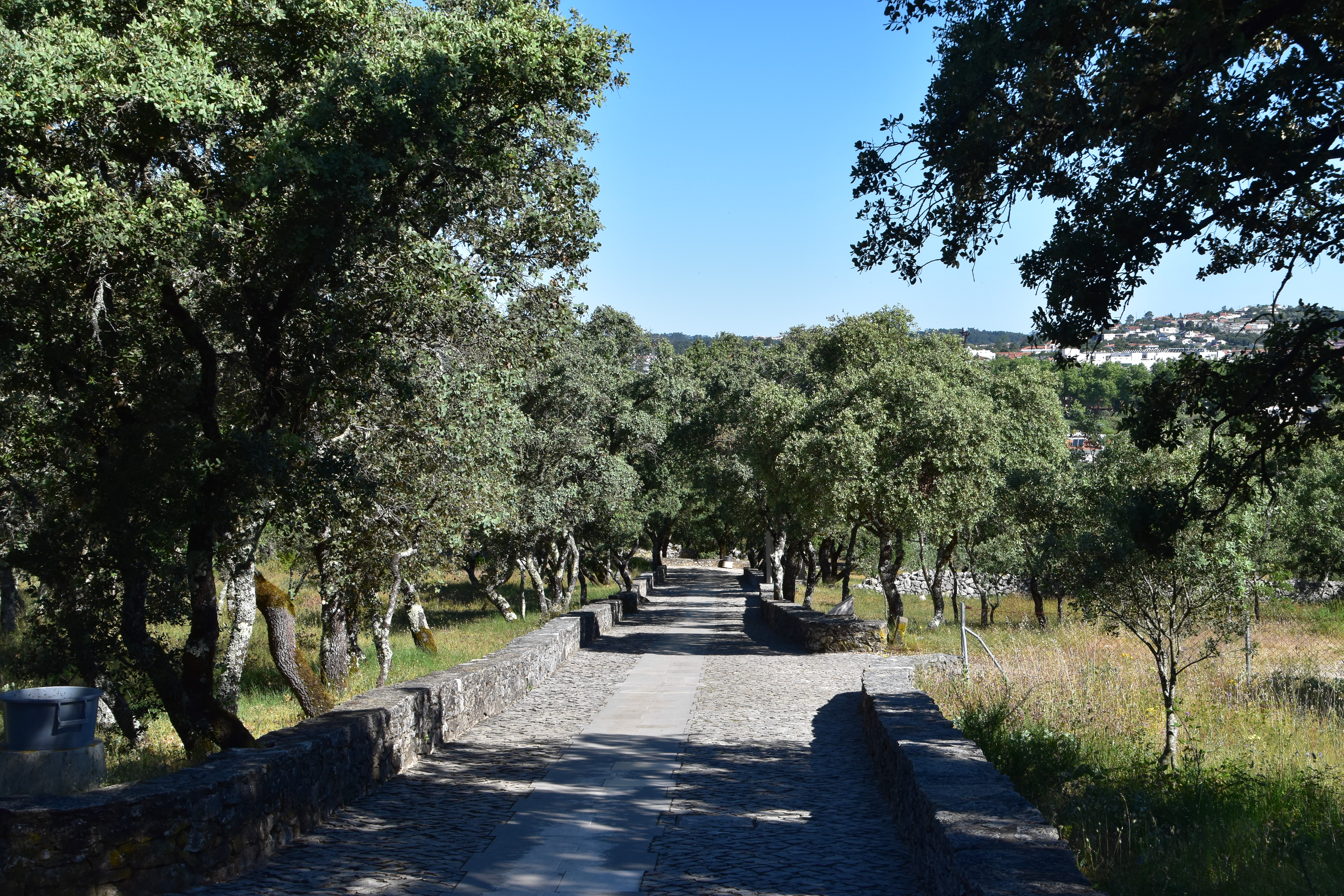
Q. rotundifolia forest in Valinhos, Fátima

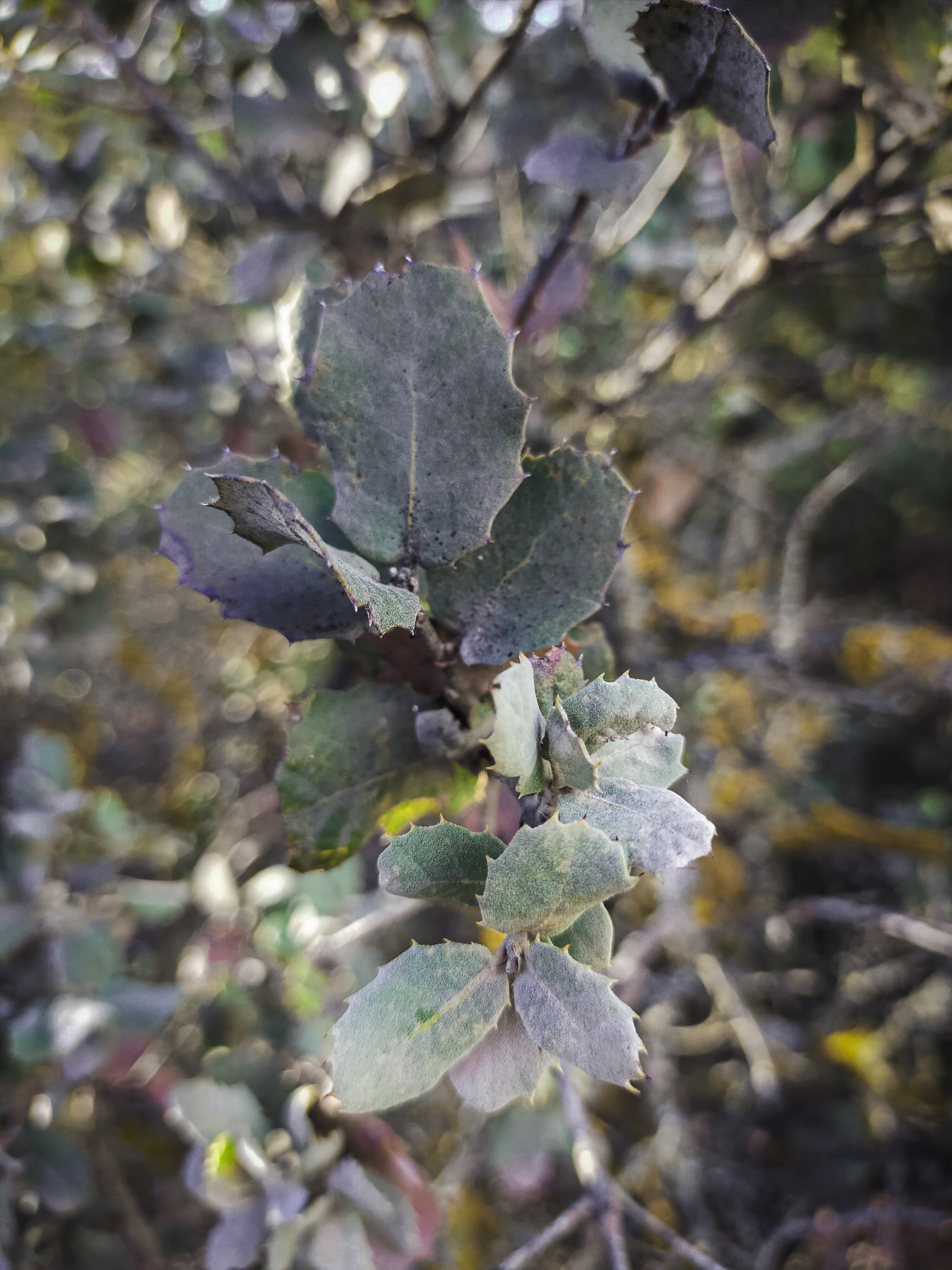
Quercus rotundifolia Lam, Tlemcen
