= Amareleja =

Civil parish of the municipality of Moura in Portugal

- Civil parish
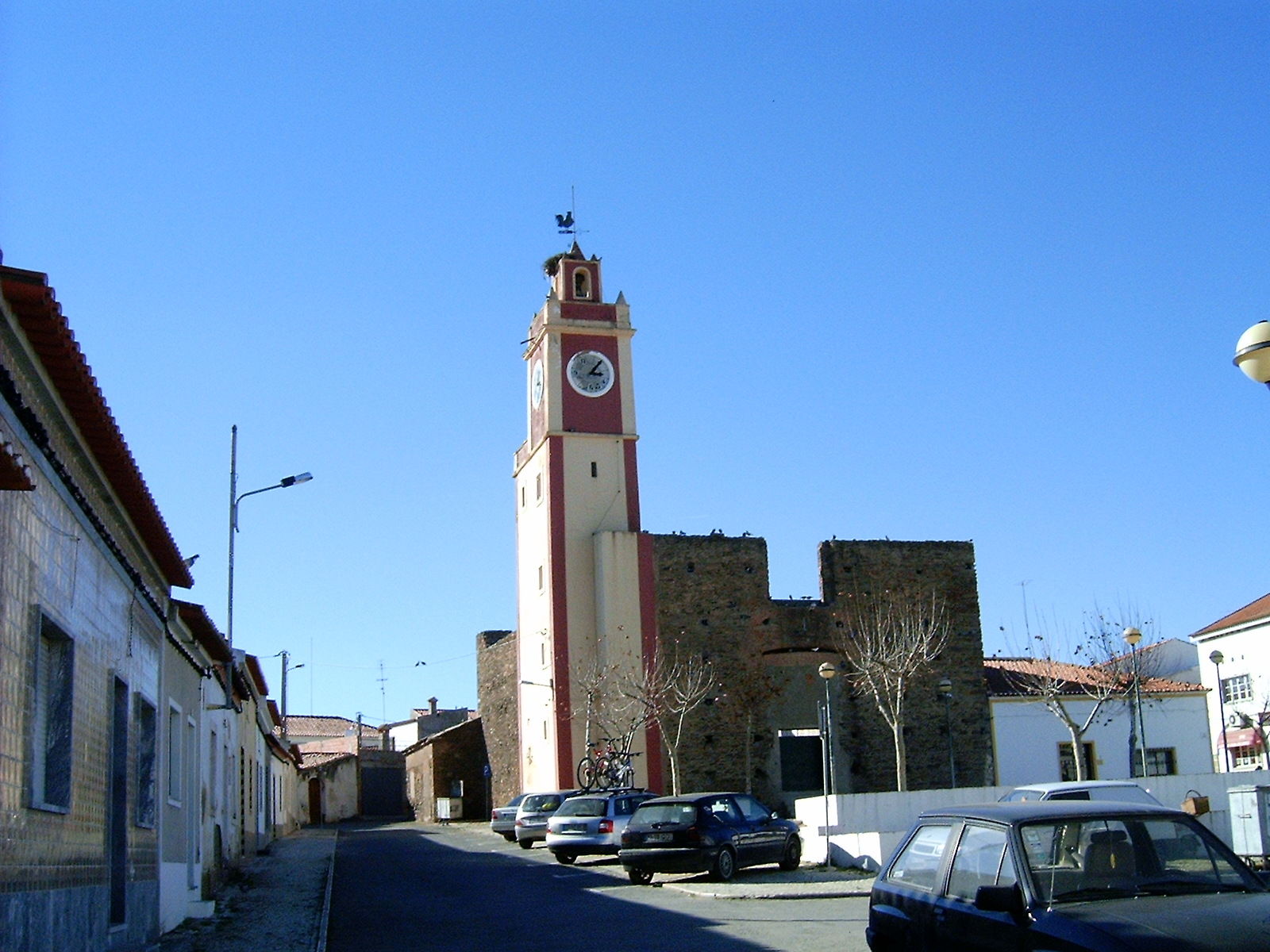
- The Old clock-tower and battlements in the centre of Amaraleja

- Location in Portugal
- Coordinates: 38.208°N 7.228°W
- Country: Portugal
- Region: Alentejo
- Intermunic. comm.: Baixo Alentejo
- District: Beja
- Municipality: Moura

Area
  - Total: 108.56 km^{2} (41.92 sq mi)

Population (2011)
  - Total: 2,564
  - Density: 23.62/km^{2} (61.17/sq mi)
- Time zone: UTC+00:00 (WET)
  - Summer (DST): UTC+01:00 (WEST)
- Postal code: 7885
- Area code: 285
- Website: amareleja.com.sapo.pt

Amareleja (pronounced [ɐmɐɾɨˈle(j)ʒɐ] or [ɐmɐɾɨˈlɐjʒɐ]) is a Portuguese civil parish of the municipality of Moura in the district of Beja. The population in 2011 was 2,564 in an area of 108.56 km^{2} (41.92 sq mi).

== History ==
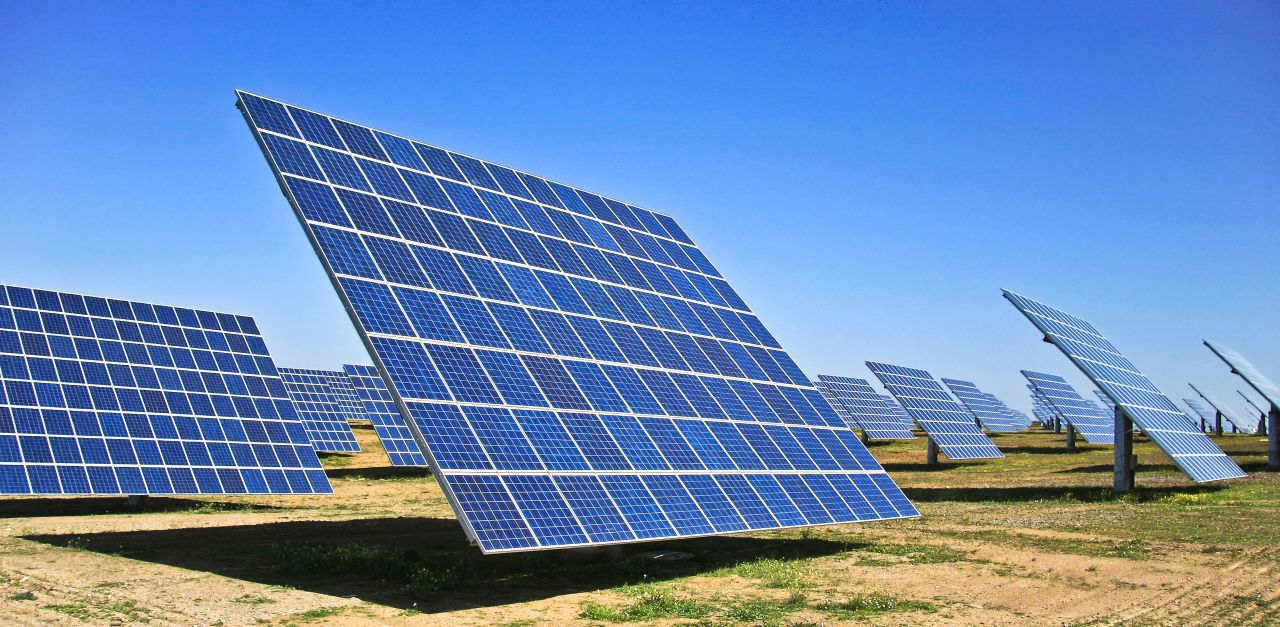
The Amareleja Photovoltaic Power Station was completed in 2010

Archeological vestiges from the Roman epoch are found in the north of the village until the margins of the River Ardila, but they suggest the fields of Amaraleja were occupied by various generations during the pre-history of the region. Antas (dolmens), burial tombs, wall paintings, flint implements, vestiges of metal smelting and Bronze Age tombs (carved into the hills) have been discovered by farmers or during road construction. Roman remnants include the pavements of buildings, circular burial tombs with bowls and fragments of bone, coins with the inscriptions of Emperor Claudius, roof tile, masonry and milling stones. In Barranco de Valtamujo there remains of a Roman bridge, that possibly connect to another along the Ardila River, and near the port of Castelo. This bridge provided a daily crossing for the residents along the margins of the Vale de Navarro, which is known for having many vestiges from antiquity.

During the reign of Sancho II, the municipal seat of Moura was conquered from the Moors, and a feudal seigneurial system was imposed in the region. Sancho relinquished the village to the Knights Hospitaller, who left their marks in the region of Amareleja (including erecting their cross in some sites). Some of the early buildings were influenced by the Order and other high nobles, who sent their shepherds and herds to graze in this part of the Kingdom. Over time a small agglomeration began to form in the area called Montinha, in the place that was later known as aldeia velha (old farm).

By November 1481, in the Cortes of the city of Évora, the representatives of the people determined the need to create chapels and hospitals in various comarcas of the Kingdom. It was during this meeting that Mareleja began to receive religious attention, but few formal records after 1527 identify what became of these deliberations: it was referenced during King John III's census (1527), identifying a small agglomeration of 55 dwellings.

By the end of the 15th century the religious needs of these people led to the construction on Montinha of the Igrejinha de Santo António (in honour of Saint Anthony of Padua, who was considered the patron saint of cattle). By this time the village had already existed for approximately five hundred years.

Parish records first identified the location as Amareleja in 1534. Until the present, there has been no firm explanation as to the name of this parish. On 10 April 1677, the parish priest, who published a book referring to the parish of Nossa Senhora de Concepsao de Marileiga. A similar document, dated 1 April 1695, also confirmed this designation and suggest a corruption of the original Marileiga. Another opinion, suggest that the settlement's name derived from the abundant yellow flowers in the region at the time, who the early settlers (likely from Beira Baixa) called Campo das Amarelas (Portuguese: Field of the Yellows). Finally, there also exist two properties between the village and the Spanish frontier that have the name Amarales and Amarela, and may have derived from these place names.

Amareleja was a victim of Spanish pillaging during the Restoration Wars; 300 mounted soldiers entered the village and sacked the homes, left, and returned later to re-sack the populace, which put up no resistance. A map from the 18th century, identifying the Alentejo campaigns during this period, shows the encounters between Spanish and Portuguese forces in Marilla (Amarelas) and Pedras, which were places near Amareleja. During one pastoral visit (29 June 1717) by Francisco Taborda described the local church as lacking ornamentation, following the Spanish invasions. Later, an order from the Bishop of Beja on 23 December 1773, to have records of baptisms and marriages sent to the bishopric: consequently, many of these books have disappeared. Many of the older documents from the parish, housed in the Torre do Tombo, refer to 1793.

After the 1755 Lisbon earthquake, which affected most of the country to some degree, the local Matriz Church was damaged. Following these events, the Portuguese archbishopric petitioned Pope Benedict XIV to invoke Saint Francisco de Borja in Portugal's post disaster reconstruction, promising processions throughout the cities and towns in the Kingdom, on the second Sunday in November.

Amareleja ceased to belong to the jurisdiction of Évora on 23 August 1842 and began to pertain to the district of Beja.

On 4 April 1990, in decree 513/V, Amareleja was elevated to the status of village, although the population was less than the 3,000 residents required by law (2758). A parliamentary debate on 8 September suggested that the lack of voters was the result of carelessness on the part of the voters, during the survey. Finally, on 20 June 1991, the Parliament approved the change, and it was enacted on August 16.

In 2010, stage 2 of the construction of the Amareleja Photovoltaic Power Station was completed.

== Geography and Climate ==
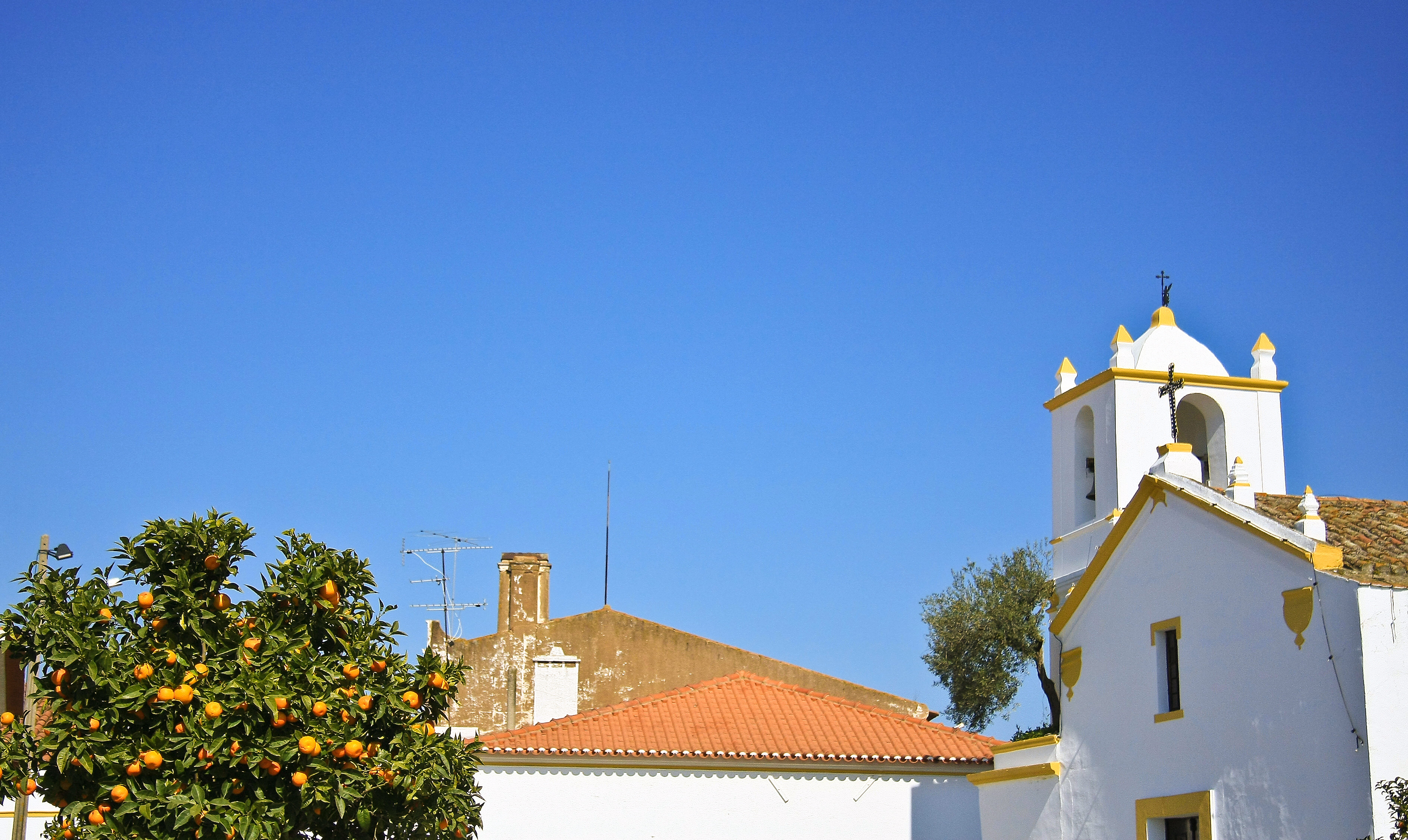
Church of Nossa Senhora da Conceição

Amaraleja is situated on the right margin of the Ardila River, in the extreme north of the municipality of Moura, not far from the Spanish border; it is surrounded west by the parishes of Santo Amador and Póvoa de São Miguel, southwest by Safara, southeast by the municipality of Barrancos (parish of Barrancos) and east by the municipality of Mourão (parish of Granja).

=== Climate ===
Amareleja has a Mediterranean climate (Köppen: Csa), bodering on a cold semi-arid climate (Köppen: BSk) with very hot, dry summers and mild, wet winters. Nights remain cool throughout the year. It is one of the driest and hottest municipalities in Portugal. Like the rest of Alentejo and Ribatejo, Amareleja is very prone to heat waves in the summer months and has recorded one of the highest temperatures ever in Europe at 47.4 °C (117.3 °F). Amareleja records an average of 53 days per year with maximum temperatures equal to or greater than 35 °C (95 °F).

Climate data for Amareleja, elevation: 183 m or 600 ft, 1991-2020 normals, extremes (1963-present, with 2003 record high)
Month	Jan	Feb	Mar	Apr	May	Jun	Jul	Aug	Sep	Oct	Nov	Dec	Year
Record high °C (°F)	24.5 (76.1)	27.0 (80.6)	31.6 (88.9)	36.7 (98.1)	39.8 (103.6)	43.9 (111.0)	46.5 (115.7)	47.4 (117.3)	44.3 (111.7)	37.2 (99.0)	28.7 (83.7)	25.0 (77.0)	47.4 (117.3)
Mean maximum °C (°F)	19.1 (66.4)	21.5 (70.7)	26.6 (79.9)	29.7 (85.5)	34.9 (94.8)	39.8 (103.6)	42.0 (107.6)	41.6 (106.9)	38.0 (100.4)	31.7 (89.1)	24.9 (76.8)	19.9 (67.8)	43.0 (109.4)
Mean daily maximum °C (°F)	14.6 (58.3)	16.5 (61.7)	20.0 (68.0)	22.1 (71.8)	26.5 (79.7)	32.0 (89.6)	35.6 (96.1)	35.3 (95.5)	30.7 (87.3)	24.9 (76.8)	18.7 (65.7)	15.4 (59.7)	24.4 (75.9)
Daily mean °C (°F)	9.3 (48.7)	10.5 (50.9)	13.4 (56.1)	15.4 (59.7)	19.0 (66.2)	23.3 (73.9)	26.1 (79.0)	26.2 (79.2)	22.9 (73.2)	18.6 (65.5)	13.2 (55.8)	10.4 (50.7)	17.4 (63.2)
Mean daily minimum °C (°F)	3.9 (39.0)	4.5 (40.1)	6.9 (44.4)	8.6 (47.5)	11.4 (52.5)	14.7 (58.5)	16.6 (61.9)	17.0 (62.6)	15.1 (59.2)	12.2 (54.0)	7.8 (46.0)	5.3 (41.5)	10.3 (50.6)
Mean minimum °C (°F)	−1.3 (29.7)	−0.7 (30.7)	0.8 (33.4)	3.5 (38.3)	5.9 (42.6)	9.9 (49.8)	11.9 (53.4)	12.2 (54.0)	10.4 (50.7)	6.3 (43.3)	1.8 (35.2)	−0.7 (30.7)	−2.6 (27.3)
Record low °C (°F)	−7.7 (18.1)	−6.1 (21.0)	−3.0 (26.6)	−2.6 (27.3)	1.5 (34.7)	4.5 (40.1)	9.0 (48.2)	7.5 (45.5)	4.5 (40.1)	0.0 (32.0)	−3.5 (25.7)	−5.5 (22.1)	−7.7 (18.1)
Average precipitation mm (inches)	48.1 (1.89)	45.5 (1.79)	49.5 (1.95)	52.2 (2.06)	42.4 (1.67)	10.5 (0.41)	1.7 (0.07)	5.0 (0.20)	27.2 (1.07)	69.6 (2.74)	65.2 (2.57)	59.9 (2.36)	476.8 (18.78)
Average precipitation days (≥ 1 mm)	7.3	5.9	6.7	7.2	5.6	1.7	0.4	0.8	3.0	7.5	7.5	7.8	61.4
Source: IPMA

Population of Amareleja (1890 - 2011)
Year	Pop.	±%
1890	3,921	—
1900	3,990	+1.8%
1911	4,655	+16.7%
1920	5,069	+8.9%
1930	5,726	+13.0%
1940	5,490	−4.1%
1950	6,447	+17.4%
1960	4,816	−25.3%
1970	3,824	−20.6%
1981	3,410	−10.8%
1991	3,237	−5.1%
2001	2,763	−14.6%
2011	2,564	−7.2%

== Architecture ==
=== Civic ===
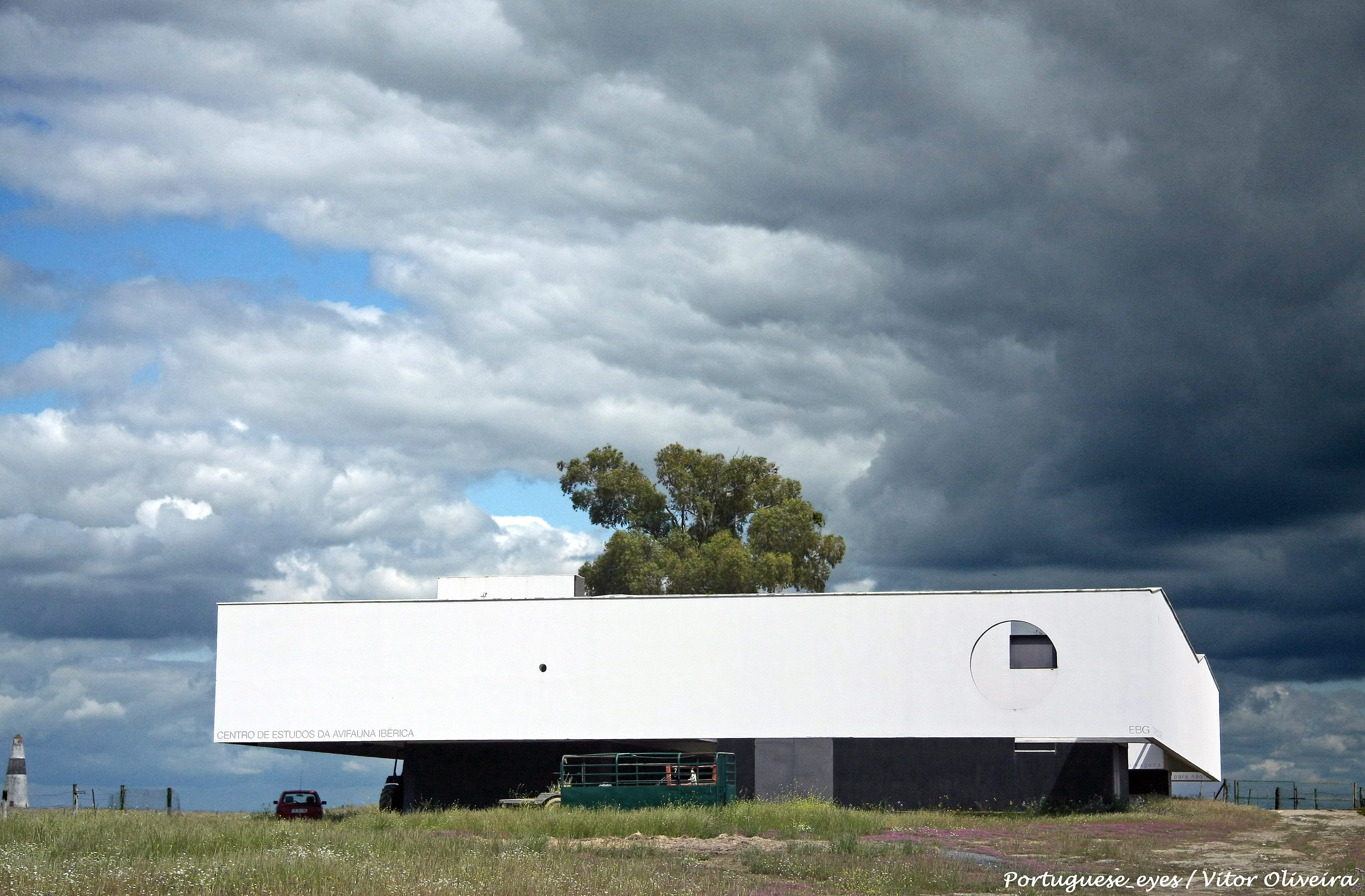
The Garducho Biological Station, located 4 km (2.5 mi) from Amareleja, won the Iberian Architecture Prize in 2009

- Bridge of the Ardila river (Portuguese: Ponte sobre o Rio Ardila)
- Bullring of Amareleja (Portuguese: Praça de Touros de Amareleja)
- Casa do Povo of Amareleja (Portuguese: Casa do Povo da Amareleja)
- Garden of Amareleja (Portuguese: Jardim Público de Amareleja)
- Garducho Biological Station (Portuguese: Estação Biológica do Garducho)
- New Watermill (Portuguese: Moinho de Água Novo)
- Post of the Fiscal Guard of Amareleja (Portuguese: Quartel da Guarda Fiscal, GF, da Amareleja)
- Residence of Palmeira (Portuguese: Casa da Palmeira)
- Roman bridge of the Ardila river (Portuguese: Ponte Romana sobre o Rio Ardila)
- Watermill of Caveira (Portuguese: Moinho de Água da Caveira)
- Watermill of Doutores (Portuguese: Moinho de Água dos Doutores)
- Watermill of Serralhão (Portuguese: Moinho de Água de Serralhão)
- Watermill of Vaca (Portuguese: Moinho de Água da Vaca)
- Watermill of Viegas (Portuguese: Moinho de Água do Viegas)
- Watermill of Volta (Portuguese: Moinho de Água da Volta)

=== Religious ===
- Chapel of Domingos Garcia (Portuguese: Capela de Domingos Garcia)
- Chapel of Santo António (Portuguese: Capela de Santo António)
- Chapel of São Vicente (Portuguese: Capela de São Vicente)
- Church of Nossa Senhora da Conceição (Portuguese: Igreja Paroquial de Amareleja/Igreja de Nossa Senhora da Conceição)
- Church of Relógio (Portuguese: Igreja da Praça/Igreja do Relógio)
- Hermitage of Arrochais de Vale Navarro (Portuguese: Ermida dos Arrochais de Vale Navarro)
