= 2003 European heatwave =

Major heat wave in Europe

Meteorological history
- Duration: July 2003 - August 2003
- Heat wave
- Max temp: 47.3 °C (117.1 °F), recorded at Amareleja, Portugal on 1 August 2003

Overall effects
- Fatalities: 72,000: Italy: ~20,000; France: 14,802-19,000; Spain: 12,963; Germany: ~9,500; United Kingdom: ~2,000; Portugal: 1,953; Netherlands: ~1,500
- Areas affected: Europe

The 2003 European heat wave saw the hottest summer recorded in Europe since at least 1540. Spain, France, and Italy were hit especially hard. The heat wave led to health crises in several countries and combined with drought to create a crop shortfall in parts of Southern Europe. The death toll has been estimated at more than 70,000.

The predominant heat was recorded in July and August, partly a result of the western European seasonal lag from the maritime influence of the Atlantic warm waters in combination with hot continental air and strong southerly winds.

== By country ==
=== France ===
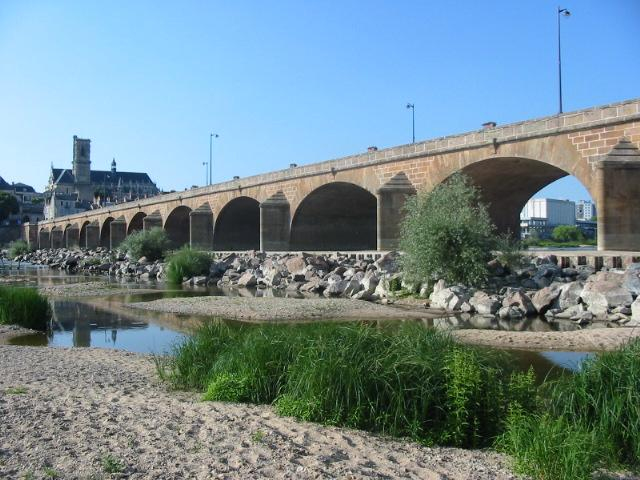
The Loire river almost dry near Nevers.

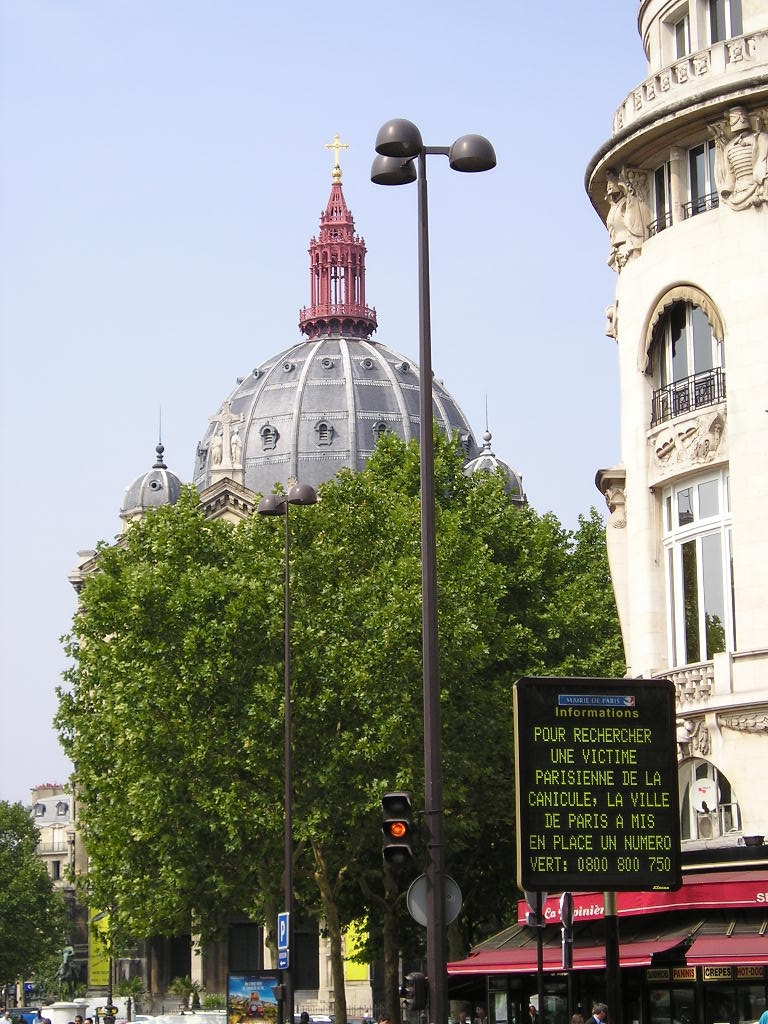
A public sign in Paris that reads: "For information on Parisian victims of the heat wave, the city of Paris has established a toll-free number: ...".

In France, 14,802 heat-related deaths (mostly among the elderly) occurred during the heat wave, according to the French National Institute of Health. France does not commonly have very hot summers, particularly in the northern areas, but eight consecutive days with temperatures of more than 40 °C were recorded in Auxerre, Yonne in early August 2003. Because of the usually relatively mild summers, most people did not know how to react to very high temperatures (for instance, with respect to rehydration). Most single-family homes and residential facilities were not equipped with central air conditioning. While contingency plans were made for a variety of natural and man-made catastrophes, high temperatures had rarely been considered a major hazard.

The catastrophe occurred in August, a month in which many people, including government ministers and physicians, are on holiday. Many bodies were not claimed for many weeks because relatives were on holiday. A refrigerated warehouse outside Paris was used by undertakers as they did not have enough space in their own facilities. On September 3, fifty-seven bodies were still left unidentified in the Parisian area, and were buried in graves provided by the state at the municipal cemetery in Thiais, a southern suburb of Paris.

The high number of deaths can be explained by the conjunction of seemingly unrelated events. Most nights in France are cool, even in summer. As a consequence, houses (usually of stone, concrete, or brick construction) do not warm too much during the daytime and radiate minimal heat at night, and air conditioning is usually unnecessary. During the heat wave, temperatures remained at record highs even at night, breaking the usual cooling cycle.

Elderly people living by themselves had never faced such extreme heat before and did not know how to react or were too mentally or physically impaired by the heat to make the necessary adaptations themselves. Elderly people with family support or those residing in nursing homes were more likely to have others who could make the adjustments for them. This led to unexpected survival rates with the weakest group having fewer deaths than the more physically fit; most of the heat victims came from the group of elderly not requiring constant medical care; often childless women who lived alone.

That shortcomings of the nation's health system could allow such a death toll is a controversy in France. The administration of President Jacques Chirac and Prime Minister Jean-Pierre Raffarin laid the blame on families who had left their elderly behind without caring for them, the 35-hour workweek, which affected the amount of time doctors could work, and family practitioners holidaying in August. Many companies traditionally closed in August, so people had no choice about when to holiday. Family doctors were still in the habit of holidaying at the same time. It is not clear that more physicians would have helped, as the main limitation was not the health system, but locating those which were needing of assistance.

The opposition, as well as many of the editorials of the French local press, blamed the administration. Many blamed Health Minister Jean-François Mattei for failing to return from his holiday when the heat wave became serious, and his aides for blocking emergency measures in public hospitals (such as the recalling of physicians). A particularly vocal critic was Dr. Patrick Pelloux, head of the union of emergency physicians, who blamed the Raffarin administration for ignoring warnings from health and emergency professionals and trying to minimize the crisis. Mattei lost his ministerial post in a cabinet reshuffle on 31 March 2004.

Not everyone blamed the government. "The French family structure is more dislocated than elsewhere in Europe, and prevailing social attitudes hold that once older people are closed behind their apartment doors or in nursing homes, they are someone else's problem", said Stéphane Mantion, an official with the French Red Cross. "These thousands of elderly victims didn't die from a heat wave as such, but from the isolation and insufficient assistance they lived with day in and out, and which almost any crisis situation could render fatal."

Moreover, the French episode of heat wave in 2003 shows how heat wave dangers result from the intricate association of natural and social factors. Although research established that heat waves represent a major threat for public health, France had no policy in place. Until the 2003 event, heat waves were a strongly underestimated risk in the French context, which partly explains the high number of victims.

Below are statistics for the month of August 2003 in France.

Location	Avg high °C	Avg low °C	Aug'03 high °C	Aug'03 mean °C	Aug'03 low °C	Max temp °C	Max mean °C	Max low °C	2–13 Aug'03 high °C	2–13 Aug'03 low °C	High >35 °C days	High >30 °C days	Mean >30 °C days	Mean >22 °C days	Low >25 °C days	Low >20 °C days
Auxerre	25.8	14.1	32.5	25.0	17.5	41.1	32.0	23.3	39.3	21.1	11	19	9	23	0	10
Bastia	29.3	19.4	33.2	28.2	23.1	37.9	30.8	25.0	33.9	23.4	7	31	3	31	2	31
Biarritz	24.7	17.0	28.2	24.0	19.8	40.6	31.0	23.5	31.6	21.3	3	6	1	25	0	13
Bordeaux	27.1	15.7	32.1	25.8	19.4	40.7	31.5	23.5	38.0	21.4	12	20	6	28	0	13
Boulogne-sur-Mer	20.5	14.9	23.3	20.0	16.8	34.8	29.5	24.1	27.7	19.2	0	5	0	7	0	6
Grenoble	26.4	14.0	33.1	24.8	16.5	39.5	29.2	20.2	37.6	17.7	12	23	0	27	0	2
Lille	23.3	13.8	26.6	21.1	15.5	36.6	28.2	20.8	32.2	18.3	3	9	0	11	0	3
Lorient	22.6	13.4	28.0	21.8	15.6	37.5	29.3	21.0	33.0	18.4	4	11	0	15	0	4
Lyon	27.2	16.0	33.6	26.8	20.0	40.5	31.2	23.2	38.4	21.5	11	25	8	30	0	17
Marseille	28.7	18.7	34.0	28.2	22.4	37.7	31.2	26.6	35.8	22.9	12	29	5	31	2	28
Metz	24.8	13.6	31.0	23.8	16.5	39.5	30.4	22.3	37.4	19.1	11	16	2	18	0	4
Montpellier	28.9	18.5	32.2	26.8	21.4	36.1	29.6	24.6	33.3	21.4	2	27	0	31	0	27
Nancy	24.7	13.2	31.3	23.7	16.1	39.3	29.1	22.2	37.2	18.0	11	16	0	19	0	3
Nantes	25.0	14.2	30.1	23.7	17.2	39.2	31.3	23.8	35.0	19.6	7	13	2	20	0	6
Nice	27.7	20.5	31.2	27.5	23.7	35.0	31.4	27.7	32.4	25.3	1	22	4	31	6	31
Nîmes	30.6	18.4	36.0	28.5	21.0	40.5	30.8	24.3	38.5	21.2	22	30	8	22	0	22
Paris	25.0	15.7	29.9	24.4	18.8	39.5	32.5	25.5	36.8	22.6	9	13	8	17	2	11
Rennes	24.3	13.7	29.8	23.1	16.8	39.5	31.8	24.0	34.3	19.1	6	13	2	19	0	4
Saint-Étienne	26.3	13.8	32.0	24.9	17.8	39.3	30.0	22.6	37.0	19.6	11	19	1	25	0	7
Strasbourg	25.4	14.1	31.9	24.4	16.8	38.5	29.2	20.8	36.6	18.6	10	18	0	24	0	4
Toulouse	27.9	16.5	34.0	27.0	20.0	40.7	31.8	23.9	38.8	21.4	15	27	8	29	0	15
Tours	25.4	13.7	31.4	24.5	17.5	39.8	31.2	22.6	37.3	21.2	11	14	5	21	0	10

The 2003 heatwave served as a wake-up call for many cities to take action on reducing climate risks in urban areas. The following year, the country drew up the National Heat Wave Plan built on national forecasting and alert systems. Despite hotter summers since, the death toll has been significantly lowered. In addition to a major effort to issue warning messages in time, the plan includes measures such as cooling rooms at senior centers, replacing tarmac at playgrounds with more heat reflective materials, and mandatory insulation in construction regulation. This reflects a growing awareness of the benefit of an integrated response to risks like heatwaves, compared to stand-alone technologies and projects and greater attention paid to green and blue infrastructure in city planning. Since 2012, French construction standards for new buildings and, to a lesser extent for existing buildings, have included requirements regarding comfort during heatwaves. In Paris, adding parks and green spaces has been another key solution to heatwaves. Urban greening is most effective when green spaces are watered during a heatwave. Doing so increases the cooling effect from evapotranspiration.

=== Portugal ===
In Portugal, there were an estimated 1,953 excess deaths (data corrected, range 1,866 to 2,039); 43% higher than the expected number for that year. 1 August 2003 was the hottest day in centuries, with night temperatures well above 30 °C (86 °F). At dawn that same day, a freak storm developed in the southern region of the country. Over the next week, a hot, strong sirocco wind contributed to the spread of extensive forest-fires.

Five percent of Portugal's countryside and 10% of the forests (215,000 hectares or an estimated 2,150 km^{2} (830 sq mi)), were destroyed, and 18 people died in the flames. In Amareleja, one of the hottest cities in Europe, temperatures reached as high as 47.3 °C (117.1 °F).

=== Luxembourg ===
In Findel, Luxembourg, the temperature reached 37.9 °C (100.2 °F) on 8 and 12 August, making it the country's highest temperature since records began in 1947. This temperature record was later broken in July 2019.

=== Netherlands ===
About 1,500 heat-related deaths occurred in the Netherlands, again largely the elderly. The heat wave broke no records, although four tropical weather-designated days in mid-July, preceding the official wave, are not counted due to a cool day in between and the nature of the Netherlands specification/definition of a heat wave.

The highest temperature recorded this heatwave was on 7 August, when in Arcen, in Limburg, a temperature of 37.8 °C (100.0 °F) was reached, 0.8 °C below the national record (since 1904). A higher temperature had only been recorded twice before. On 8 August, a temperature of 37.7 °C (99.9 °F) was recorded, and 12 August had a temperature of 37.2 °C (99.0 °F).

=== Spain ===
Initially, 141 deaths were attributed to the heat wave in Spain. A further research of INE estimated a 12,963 excess of deaths during summer of 2003. Temperature records were broken in various cities, with the heat wave being more felt in typically cooler northern Spain.

Record temperatures were felt in:

- Jerez, 45.1 °C (113.2 °F)
- Girona, 41 °C (106 °F)
- Burgos, 38.8 °C (101.8 °F)
- San Sebastián, 38.6 °C (101.5 °F)
- Pontevedra, 36 °C (97 °F)
- Barcelona, 36 °C (97 °F)

=== Italy ===
The summer of 2003 was among the warmest in the preceding three centuries. The weather station of Catenanuova, in Sicily, had a monthly mean of 31.5 °C (88.7 °F) in July 2003, with an absolute maximum of 46.0 °C (114.8 °F) on 17 July, with monthly mean maximum temperatures of 36.0 °C (96.8 °F), 38.9 °C (102.0 °F) and 38.0 °C (100.4 °F) in June, July, and August, respectively. On some days, the increase in power consumption, paired with a 800MW reduction of the electricity imported from France, itself coping with the heat wave, compelled the Italian power companies to set up rolling blackouts. Italy estimated that the number of heat wave related deaths was approximately 20,000.

=== Germany ===
In Germany, shipping could not navigate the Elbe or Danube, as a result of low water levels. Low water levels at the Rhine led to a reduction of cargo capacity by 70% to 80%. The drought also led to a reduction in agricultural production. Coal Power Plants and Nuclear Power Plants had to reduce their electricity production because they could not discharge cooling water into the rivers because of their already high water temperature. Together with the limited output of hydroelectric power stations, this led to a rise in electricity prices.

Summer 2003 had an average temperature of 19.6 °C, the warmest in the recorded history of Germany. On 9 August temperatures rose to 40.2 °C in Karlsruhe and again on 13 August in Karlsruhe and Freiburg. The number of heat related deaths was estimated to be 9500.

=== Switzerland ===
Melting glaciers in the Alps caused avalanches and flash floods in Switzerland. A new nationwide record temperature of 41.5 °C (106.7 °F) was recorded in Grono, Graubünden.

=== United Kingdom ===
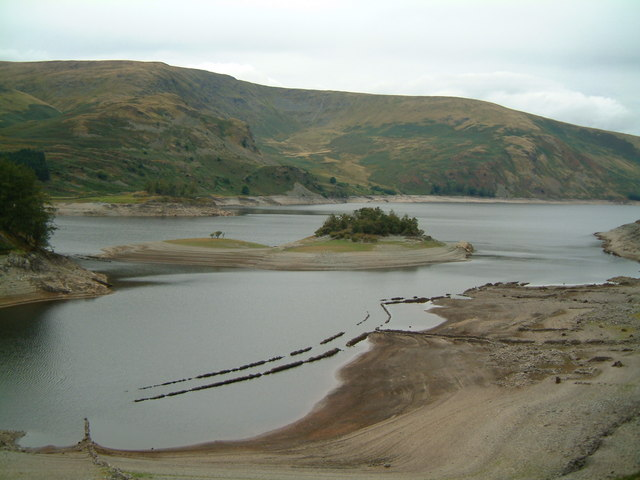
Low water level in Haweswater Reservoir, September 2003

The United Kingdom experienced one of its hottest summers on record. Atlantic cyclones brought cool and wet weather for a short while at the end of July and beginning of August before the temperatures started to increase substantially on 3 August. Several weather records were broken in the United Kingdom, including a new record for the country's highest ever recorded temperature of 38.5 °C (101.3 °F) at Faversham in Kent on 10 August, which remained the highest recorded temperature in the UK until the heatwave in July 2019.

This was the first occasion on which temperatures exceeding 38 °C (100 °F) had ever been officially recorded in the UK. Scotland broke its highest temperature record with 32.9 °C (91.2 °F) recorded in Greycrook in the Scottish borders on 9 August.

Due to a number of deaths, the UK government released its Heat Health Watch system, issuing warnings if temperatures rise above 30 °C in the day and 15 °C at night. According to the BBC, over 2,000 more people than usual may have died in the United Kingdom during the 2003 heatwave.

The tarmac melted on part of the M25 between Junctions 26 and 27, and rails buckled from expansion on the hottest day in England in 13 years, while two teenaged boys drowned while trying to escape the excessive heat.

=== Ireland ===
The summer of 2003 was warmer than average in Ireland. The heat was far less pronounced there than in the rest of Europe. August was by far the warmest, sunniest, and driest month, with temperatures roughly 2 °C above average. The highest temperature recorded was 28.4 °C (83.1 °F) at Belderrig (County Mayo) on 8 August.

== Agricultural impact ==
Crops in Southern Europe suffered the most from drought.

=== Wheat ===
These shortfalls in wheat harvest occurred as a result of the long drought.

- France – 20%
- Italy – 13%
- United Kingdom – 12%
- Ukraine – 75% (unknown if affected by heatwave or an early freeze that year)
- Moldova – 80%

Many other countries had shortfalls of 5–10%, and the EU total production was down by 10 million tonnes, or 10%.

=== Grapes ===
The heatwave greatly accelerated the ripening of grapes; also, the heat dehydrated the grapes, making for more concentrated juice. By mid-August, the grapes in certain vineyards had already reached their optimal sugar content, possibly resulting in 12.0°–12.5° wines (see alcoholic degree). Because of that, and also of the impending change to rainy weather, the harvest was started much earlier than usual (e.g. in mid-August for areas that are normally harvested in September).

The wines from 2003, although in scarce quantity, were predicted to have exceptional quality, especially in France. The heatwave made Hungary fare extremely well in the Vinalies 2003 International wine contest: a total of nine gold and nine silver medals were awarded to Hungarian winemakers.

== Oceanic impact ==
The anomalous overheating affecting the atmosphere also created anomalies on sea surface stratification in the Mediterranean Sea and on the surface currents, as well. A seasonal current of the central Mediterranean Sea, the Atlantic Ionian Stream (AIS), was affected by the warm temperatures, resulting in modifications in its path and intensity. The AIS is important for the reproduction biology of important pelagic commercial fish species, so the heatwave may have influenced indirectly the stocks of these species.

== Economic impact ==
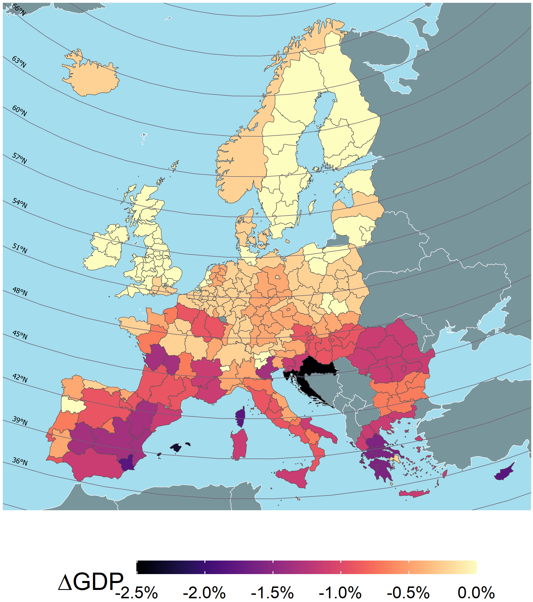
The regional-level cost of heatwaves (as a share of regional GDP) in 2003

Extreme heat undermines the working capacity of individuals, resulting in lower productivity, and thus economic output. In 2003, economic losses attributed to excessive heat amounted to 0.5% of European Gross Domestic Product (GDP). This is 2.5 times higher than the losses experienced during an average year over the historical period 1981–2010. Losses of over 1% of GDP were recorded in areas with high exposure to heat and showing a large share of outdoor work.
