= Barranquenho =

Mixed Portuguese-Spanish language of Barrancos, Portugal

- Barranquenhu
- Native to: Portugal
- Region: Barrancos
- Native speakers: (undated figure of 1,500)
- Language family: Indo-European: Italic; Latino-Faliscan; Latin; Romance; Italo-Western; Western Romance; Gallo-Iberian; Iberian Romance; West Iberian; Castilian and Galician–Portuguese; Spanish and Portuguese; Alentejan Portuguese, Extremaduran Spanish, and Andalusian Spanish; Barranquenho
- Early forms: Old Latin: Vulgar Latin; Proto-Romance; Galician-Portuguese and Old Spanish; Portuguese and Early Modern Spanish; Portuguese and Modern Spanish

Language codes
- ISO 639-3: None (mis)
- Linguist List: 1oy
- Glottolog: None
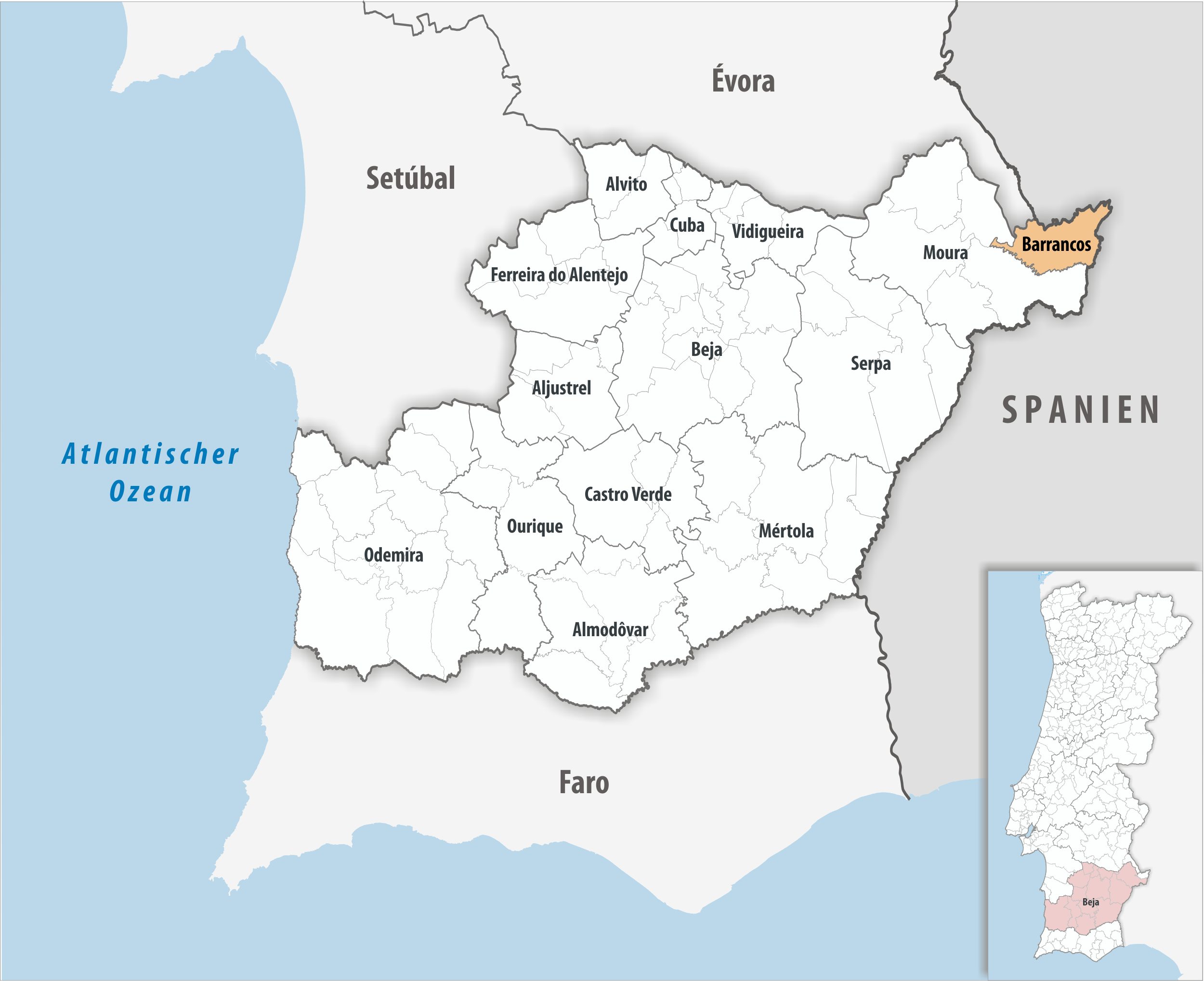
- Location of Barrancos in the Beja District

Barranquenho (Barranquenhu) is a Romance linguistic variety spoken in the Portuguese town of Barrancos, near the Spanish border. It is a mixed language, and can be considered either a variety of Portuguese (Alentejan Portuguese) heavily influenced by the Spanish dialects of neighbouring areas in Spain in Extremadura and Andalusia (especially those from Encinasola and Rosal de la Frontera), or a Spanish dialect (Extremaduran / Andalusian) heavily influenced by Portuguese.

Barranquenho speakers maintain that they speak neither Spanish nor Portuguese but a third language altogether different. Ethnologue lists Barranquenho (as Barranquian) as a dialect of Extremaduran, perhaps because Barrancos was populated by settlers from Badajoz, a city in Extremadura, though not in an Extremaduran language speaking area.

The development of Barranquenho seems to be relatively recent, the variety developing no earlier than 1527 and likely by the early 1800s, unlike other minority linguistic varieties in the Iberian Peninsula, which have medieval roots.

== Characteristics ==
Like Portuguese, Barranquenho has seven oral vowels and contrasts /s/ and /z/.

The most characteristic aspect of this dialect is the debuccalization of the ⟨s⟩ and ⟨z⟩ in the end of words, as in all the Extremaduran, Andalusian, and other southern peninsular dialects: cruh (Portuguese/Spanish: cruz; English: cross), buhcá (Portuguese/Spanish: buscar; English: search). Sometimes these letters can be completely muted: uma bê (Portuguese: uma vez; English: once). The Portuguese ⟨j⟩, ⟨ge⟩ and ⟨gi⟩, usually pronounced as [ʒ], are pronounced as [x].

The ⟨l⟩ and ⟨r⟩ in the end of the words are absent: Manué (Manuel), olivá (Spanish: olivar). But they appear again in the plural form, where they are not final: olivareh (olivares). If the ⟨l⟩ is at the end of a syllable it turns into ⟨r⟩: argo (Portuguese/Spanish: algo). This is similar to Andalusian and Extremaduran Spanish. Like in Spanish, and also some dialects of Portuguese, there is no differentiation between ⟨b⟩ and ⟨v⟩, both are pronounced as either [b] or [β]. Just as in Extremaduran and some southern dialects of Portuguese, the -e suffix at the end of a word (for example pobre) is pronounced [i], as opposed to [ɨ] in standard European Portuguese or [e] in Spanish.

The Portuguese form of the first person of the plural, nós, is replaced by nusotrus - a variation of the Spanish nosotros. The placing of the pronouns is closer to the Spanish norm than to the Portuguese: se lavô (Portuguese: lavou-se; Spanish: se lavó; English: was washed).

It also contains many verbal forms reminiscent of Spanish: andubi (Portuguese: andei, Spanish: anduve); supimos (Portuguese: soubemos; Spanish: supimos).

Barranquenho uses definite and indefinite articles like o, a, os, as, as Portuguese does. It prefers the common Spanish diminutive -ito to the Portuguese -inho, and it typically uses the present subjunctive for future reference, as in quando eli benha 'when he comes'.

== Recognition ==
On 26 November 2021, the Parliament of Portugal unanimously voted for the approval of a resolution through which Barranquenho was recognized and protected in the municipality.

In March 2024 three lessons were held in the language in a writing workshop of the Barrancos School Group.

== See also ==
- Iberian languages
- Languages of Portugal
- Languages of Spain
- Iberian Romance languages
- Portuñol

== Bibliography ==
- Clements, J. Clancy (2009). "Barranquenho". The linguistic legacy of Spanish and Portuguese: colonial expansion and language change. Cambridge. pp. 190–209. doi:10.1017/CBO9780511576171.009. ISBN 9780511576171.
