= Barrancos =

- Municipality
- Town of Barrancos
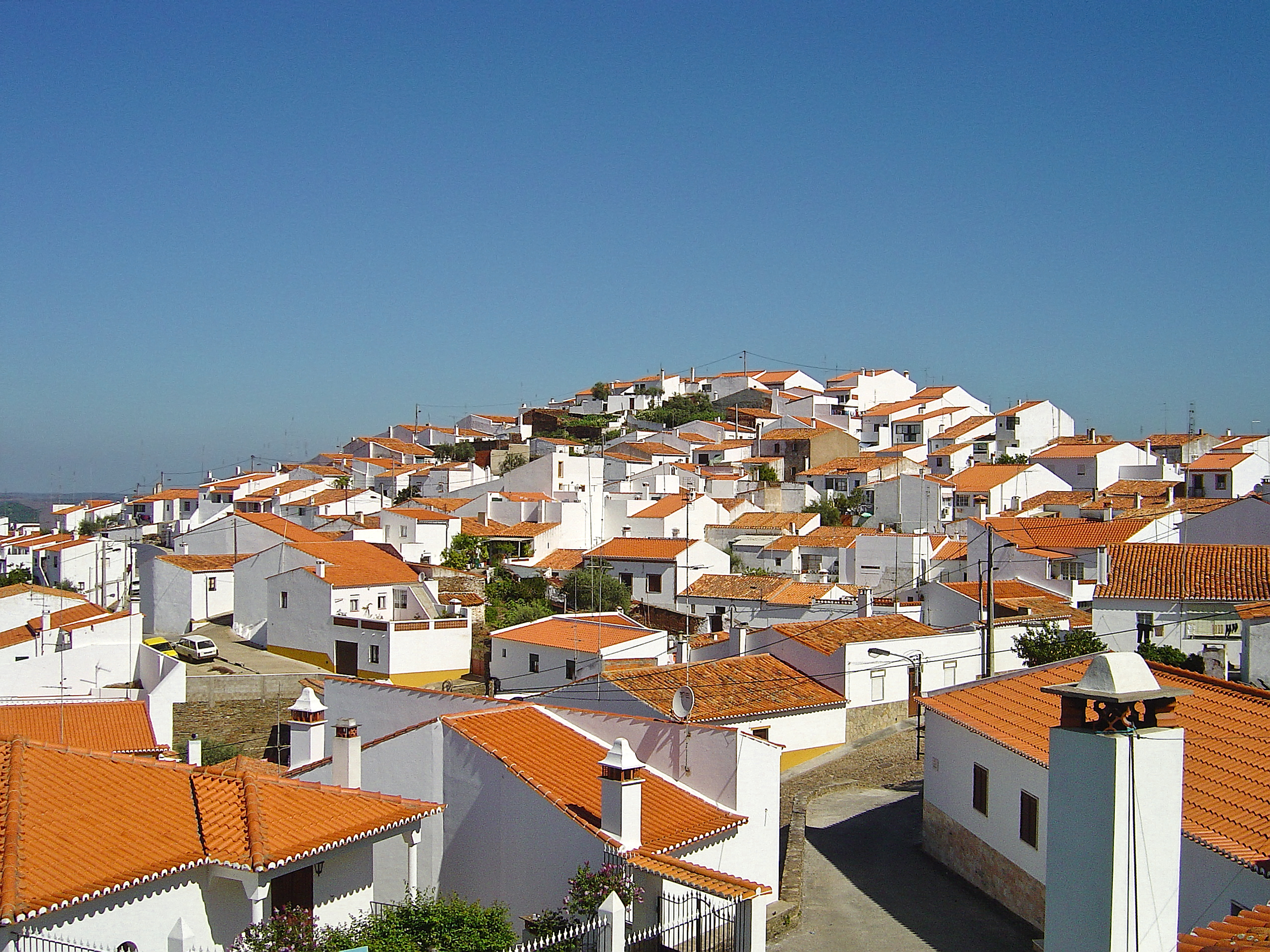
- View of Barrancos

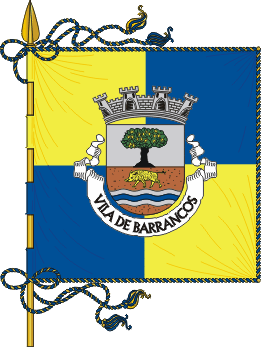
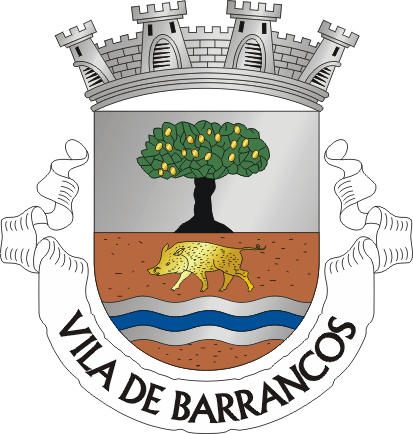
- Flag Coat of arms
- Interactive map of Barrancos
- Location in Portugal
- Coordinates: 38°07′N 6°58′W
- Country: Portugal
- Region: Alentejo
- Intermunic. comm.: Baixo Alentejo
- District: Beja
- Parishes: 1

Government
  - President: Leonel Caçador Rodrigues (CDU)

Area
  - Total: 168.42 km^{2} (65.03 sq mi)

Population (2021)
  - Total: 1,438
  - Density: 8.538/km^{2} (22.11/sq mi)
- Time zone: UTC+00:00 (WET)
  - Summer (DST): UTC+01:00 (WEST)
- Local holiday: August 28
- Website: www.cm-barrancos.pt

Barrancos (European Portuguese: [bɐˈʁɐ̃kuʃ], locally: [bɐˈrɐ̃kuʃ]: Barranquenho: Barrancu), officially the Town of Barrancos (Portuguese: Vila de Barrancos), is a town and a municipality in southeastern Portugal, by the Spanish border. With a population of 1,438 as of 2021, it is the least populated municipality in Continental Portugal. Covering an area of 168.42 square kilometres (65.03 mi^{2}), Barrancos is one of only six Portuguese municipalities comprising a single civil parish.

The area has been inhabited since prehistoric times, with archaeological evidence dating back to the Paleolithic. During the Middle Ages, urbanization was centered around the Castle of Noudar, a fortress that changed hands between Portugal and Castile until its definitive incorporation into Portugal in 1295. In the 19th century, the administrative center shifted to Barrancos, which became the seat of the municipality.

Barrancos has a distinctive cultural identity shaped by centuries of cross-border interaction. It is known for the Barranquenho language, and for its annual Fêra de Barrancos, a festival combining religious and pagan traditions in honor of its patron saint, Our Lady of the Immaculate Conception. The town also holds the only bullfighting events in Portugal where killing the bull in the ring is permitted, under a legal exception granted in 2002.

Among its economic activities are agriculture and livestock rising, being a production center for Barrancos ham, a type of presunto (dry-cured ham), similar to the jamón ibérico, made from Black Iberian Pig (also known as Porco Alentejano).

The present Mayor is Leonel Caçador Rodrigues, elected by the Unitary Democratic Coalition.

== History ==
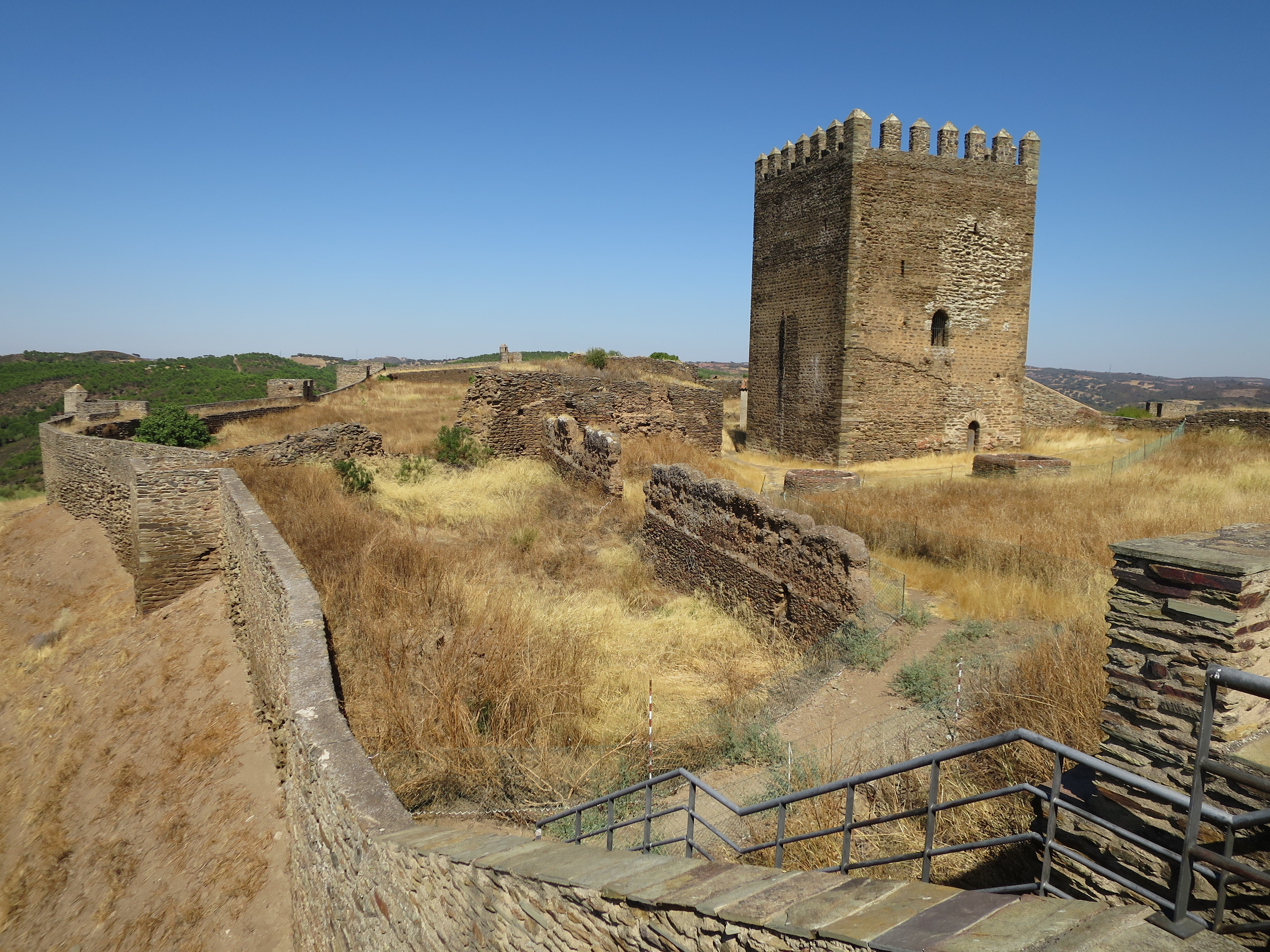
Castle of Noudar

The area of present-day Barrancos has been inhabited since prehistoric times, with evidence of occupation dating back to the Chalcolithic and even the Paleolithic periods. Human occupation continued during the Roman, Visigothic and Moorish periods, as evidenced by artifacts. In 1167, the territory was conquered by the Portuguese nobleman Gonçalo Mendes da Maia, during the reign of Afonso I. Following the Christian reconquest, King Sancho I ordered the resettlement of the region in 1200. At that time, the municipal seat was established in the fortified village of Noudar, within the Castle of Noudar, located 12 kilometres (7.5 mi) northwest of Barrancos.

During the 13th century, Noudar shifted hands between Portugal and Castile, as highlighted by the donation of the village by King Alfonso X of Castile to his daughter Beatrice on 4 March 1283. The village was definitively incorporated into the Kingdom of Portugal in 1295, when King Denis issued a royal charter (foral) to Noudar, later confirmed by King Manuel I in 1513.

At the time, the effective border between the two kingdoms remained undefined around Noudar. Instead, there was a common use border territory called Contenda de Moura, where the populations of both kingdoms were allowed to practice pastoral grazing. Consequently, Castilian and Leonese settlers, under the protection of the Order of Avis from at least the 15th century, established themselves in the region and contributed to the development of a hybrid culture and the emergence of the Barranquenho language. The official border at the Ardila River would only be settled in 1893, upon the dissolution and partition of the Contenda.

Noudar endured repeated conflicts between Portugal and Castile including a period of Castilian occupation from 1707 to 1715. During the Portuguese Restoration War, the village of Barrancos suffered significant destruction between June and August 1641, when Portuguese forces, acting on royal orders, burned the settlement. This episode likely contributed to the loss of historical written records.

From the early 19th century, Noudar began to decline as its military importance diminished, leading to a gradual depopulation. By 1835, the administrative designation "municipality of Noudar and Barrancos" appeared, reflecting the shifting population center. The administrative reforms of Mouzinho da Silveira in 1836 elevated Barrancos to the status of vila (town), effectively transferring the municipal seat from Noudar to Barrancos.

Between 1896 and 1898, Barrancos was briefly merged into the municipality of Moura during an administrative reorganization, but its municipal status was restored in 1898.

== Geography ==
Barrancos is located in the easternmost municipality in the Beja District and a part of the Alentejo region. It is bordered by the Portuguese municipalities of Moura to the east and south and Mourão to the northeast and by the Spanish municipalities of Jerez de los Caballeros to the north and Encinasola to the west.

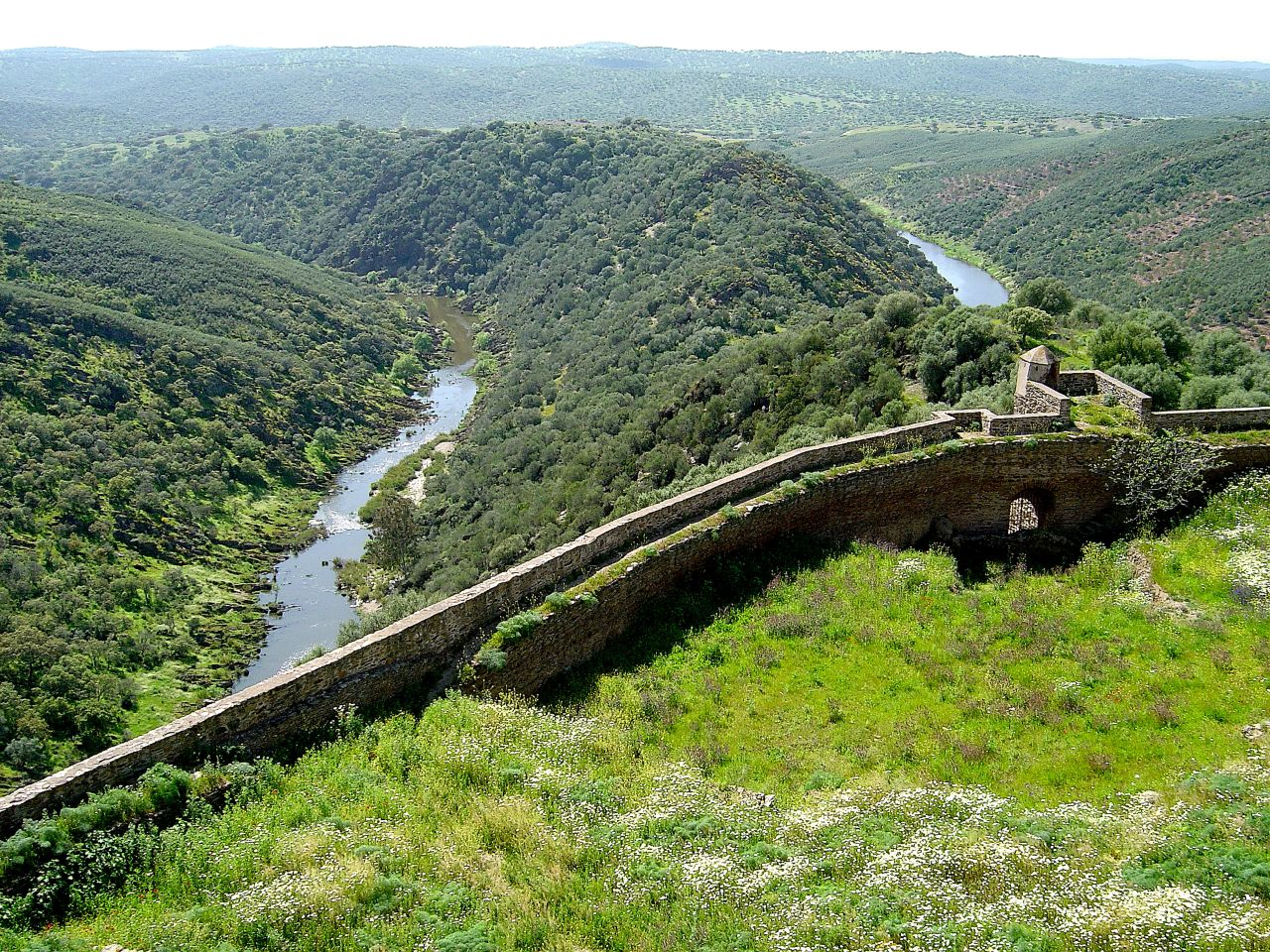
Nature surrounding Castle of Noudar

The municipality of Barrancos lies within the boundaries of the Moura/Barrancos Natura 2000 site, a protected area established under the EU Habitats Directive in 1998. Covering an area of 43,290 hectares (107,000 acres), it is recognized for its high biodiversity and well-preserved Mediterranean ecosystems. The landscape is characterized by rolling hills and schist plateaus interspersed with holm oak woodlands and cork oak groves. These habitats sustain a mosaic of scrublands, natural grasslands, and riparian vegetation along seasonal watercourses such as the Ardila, Murtega, and Murtigão rivers. The site is of national importance for the conservation of cave-dwelling bats, including maternity colonies of Mehely’s horseshoe bat, greater mouse-eared bat, and Schreiber’s bat, and it serves as the principal winter refuge for several Rhinolophus species in Portugal. Its watercourses support endemic and threatened freshwater species, such as the saramugo, the southern straight-mouth nase, and the Eurasian otter. Historically a habitat for the Iberian lynx (Lynx pardinus), the area retains suitable conditions for potential recolonization or reintroduction of the species.

== Demographics ==
Population of Barrancos (1864–2021)
Year	Pop.	±%
1864	1,994	—
1878	2,372	+19.0%
1890	2,581	+8.8%
1900	2,659	+3.0%
1911	2,753	+3.5%
1920	2,999	+8.9%
1930	3,210	+7.0%
1940	3,489	+8.7%
1950	3,624	+3.9%
1960	3,429	−5.4%
1970	2,610	−23.9%
1981	2,157	−17.4%
1991	2,052	−4.9%
2001	1,924	−6.2%
2011	1,834	−4.7%
2021	1,438	−21.6%
Source: INE

As of 2021, Barrancos was the least populated municipality in Continental Portugal, hosting only 1,438 inhabitants. The municipality is suffering the fastest decline in population in the country, having reported a 21.6% decline in just ten years. Like many municipalities in the interior of the country, Barrancos is experiencing significant population aging, with 27% of its inhabitants being over 64 years old, compared to the national average of 23%.

== Culture and language ==
Barrancos has a distinctive cultural identity shaped by its location on the Portuguese–Spanish border and centuries of cross-cultural interaction. Cultural practices in Barrancos display Spanish influences, particularly in oral traditions, music, cuisine, and local festivals. This hybrid identity has historically set Barrancos apart from neighboring Portuguese communities. Anthropological studies have noted that locals often see themselves as distinct from both Portuguese and Spanish, and outsiders have described the town as culturally and linguistically unique.

The most notable expression of this hybrid heritage is the Barranquenho language, a mixed variety arising from sustained contact between southern Portuguese and Spanish dialects. The Barranquenho language is primarily oral and exhibits features from both Portuguese and Spanish in its phonology, syntax, and lexicon. Examples include the placement of clitic pronouns and the use of Spanish vocabulary and grammatical structures within predominantly Portuguese sentences. Despite being traditionally referred to as a dialect or border speech, recent linguistic research considers Barranquenho a minority language in its own right, albeit one that is endangered due to demographic decline and assimilation pressures. Efforts to preserve and revitalize the language include its protection since 2021, including the right to learn it in Portuguese schools and the language's designation as Municipal Intangible Cultural Heritage in 2008.

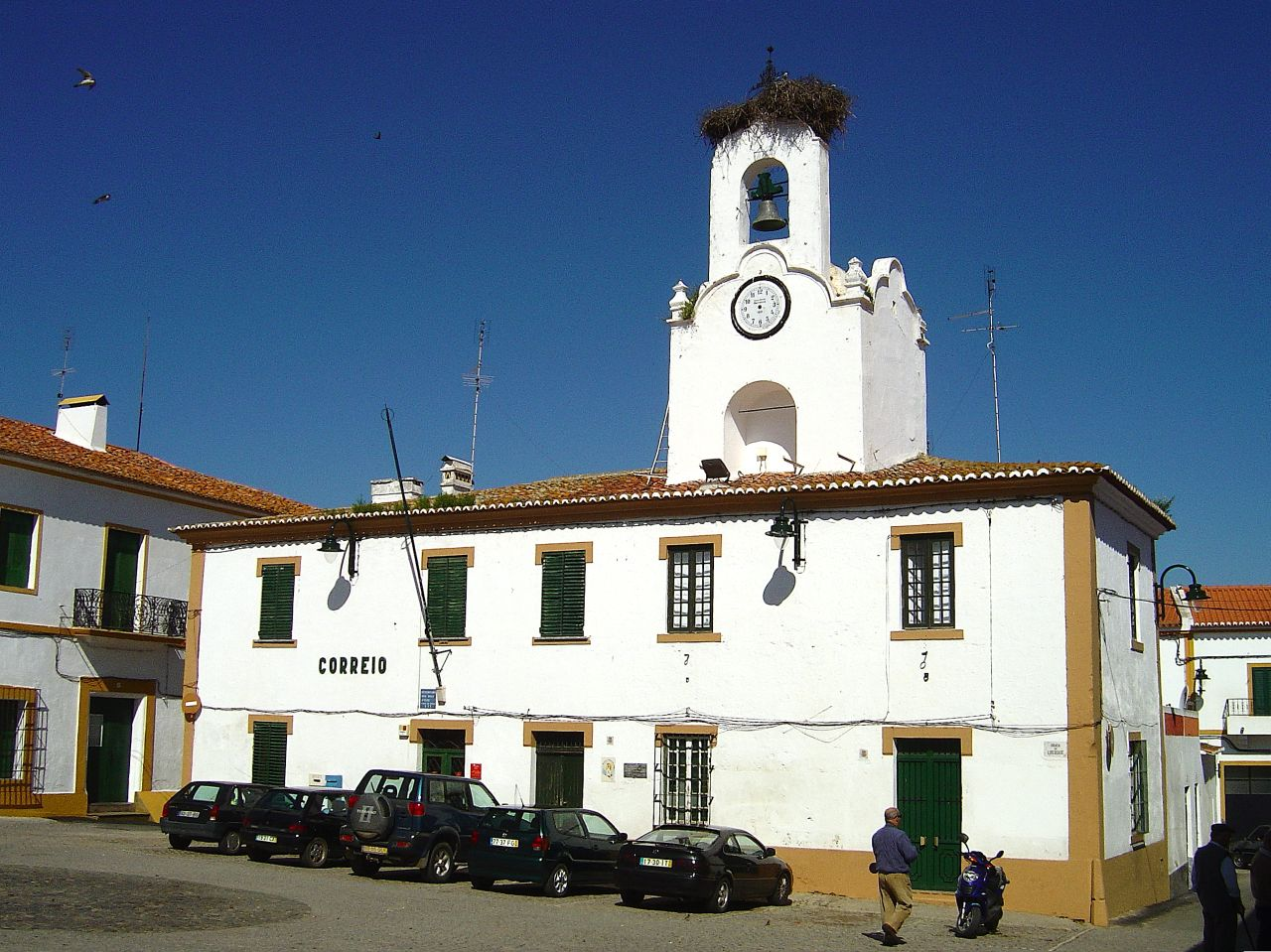
Praça da Liberdade

Barrancos' culture also differs from the rest of Portugal in its bullfighting traditions, as it is the only location where killing of the bull in the ring is permitted, a practice commonly referred to as Spanish style. This practice, once prevalent in the country was phased out in 1840 and officially banned in 1928. However, it continued being practiced thereafter in the municipality, eventually leading to an official exception in 2002. The controversy surrounding this tradition in the late 20th century sparked strong community solidarity and was a catalyst for greater awareness of Barranquenho identity and cultural autonomy. Nonetheless, in present day, the practice of bullfighting in Barrancos and the rest of the country remains a heated point of debate, due to concerns over animal suffering.

Barrancos’ municipal holiday, celebrated on 28 August, coincides with the Fêra de Barrancos, a three-day festival held in honor of Our Lady of the Immaculate Conception (Nossa Senhora da Conceição), the town’s patron saint, combining religious and pagan elements, including bullfighting events. The religious aspect of the event includes a mass in the parish church and a procession through the streets. The bullfighting events start in the morning with encerros, when bulls are led through the streets to the improvised bullring in Praça da Liberdade, a central square. In the evenings, matadors face the bulls in front of large crowds, and the final day traditionally ends with a vacada, where a cow is fought by amateur bullfighters before being killed in the arena.

== Notable people ==
- Paulo Guerra (born 1970 in Barrancos) a Portuguese former long-distance runner who specialized in the 10,000 metres and cross-country running

== Gallery ==
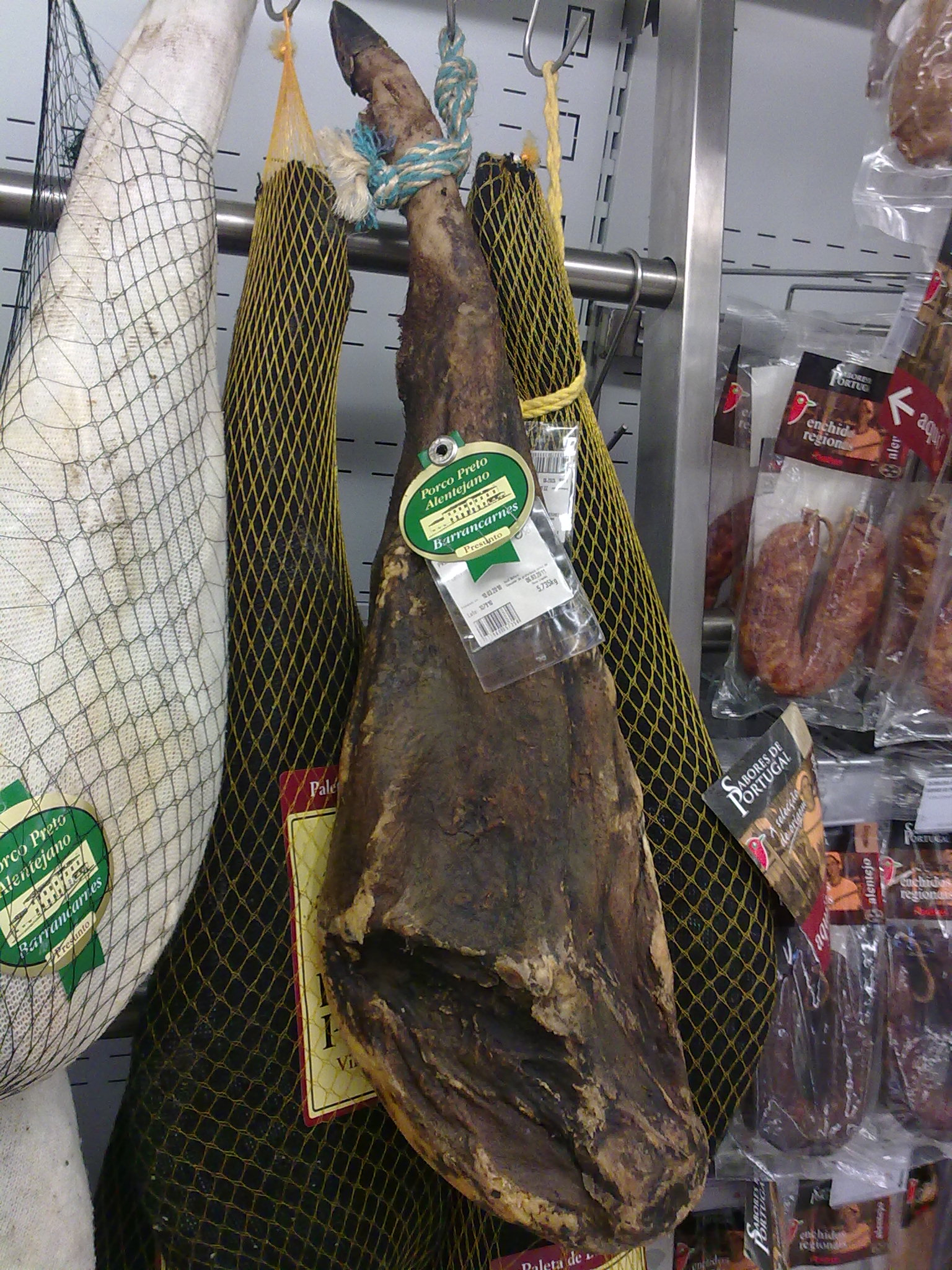
Barrancos presunto

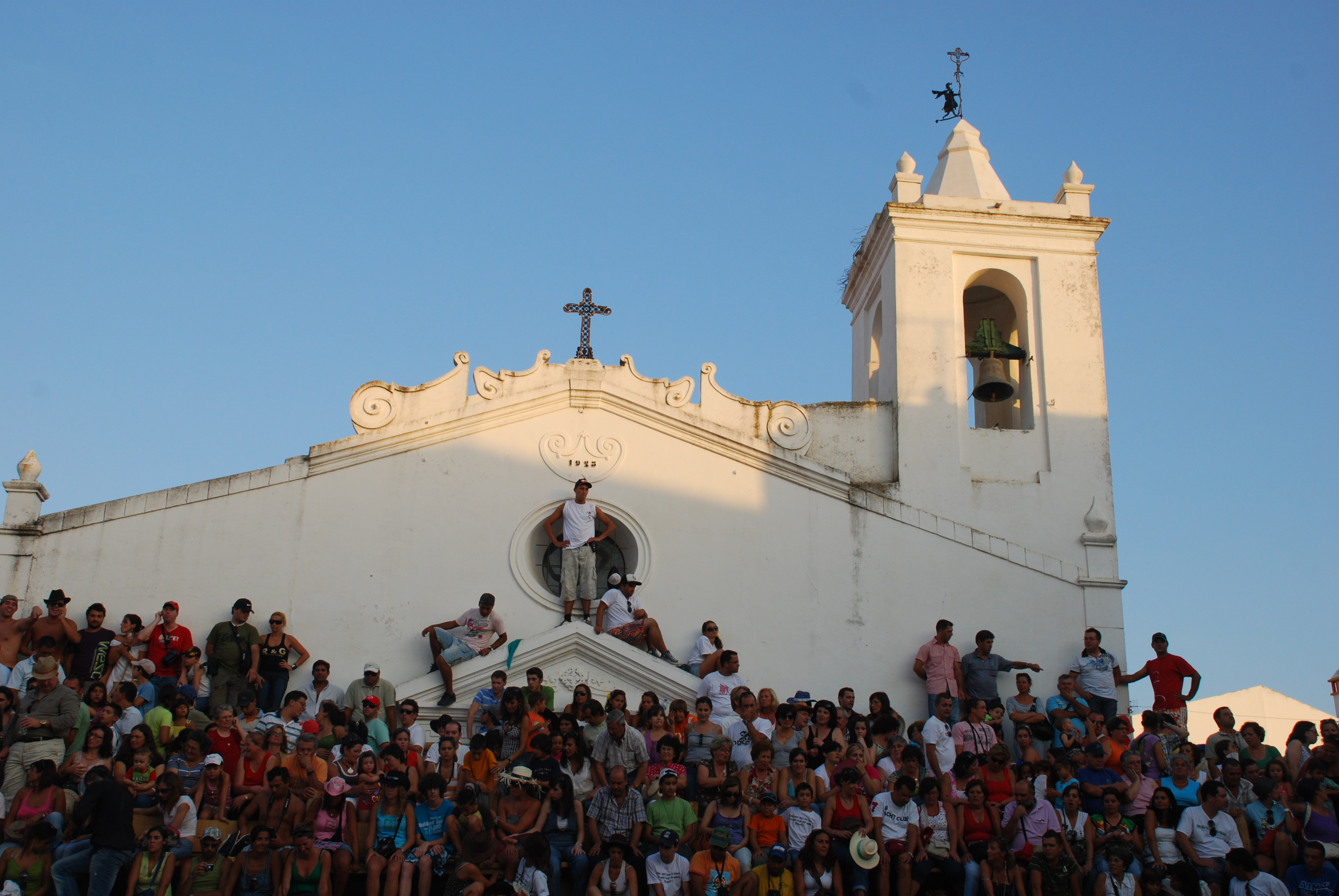
Barrancos parochial church

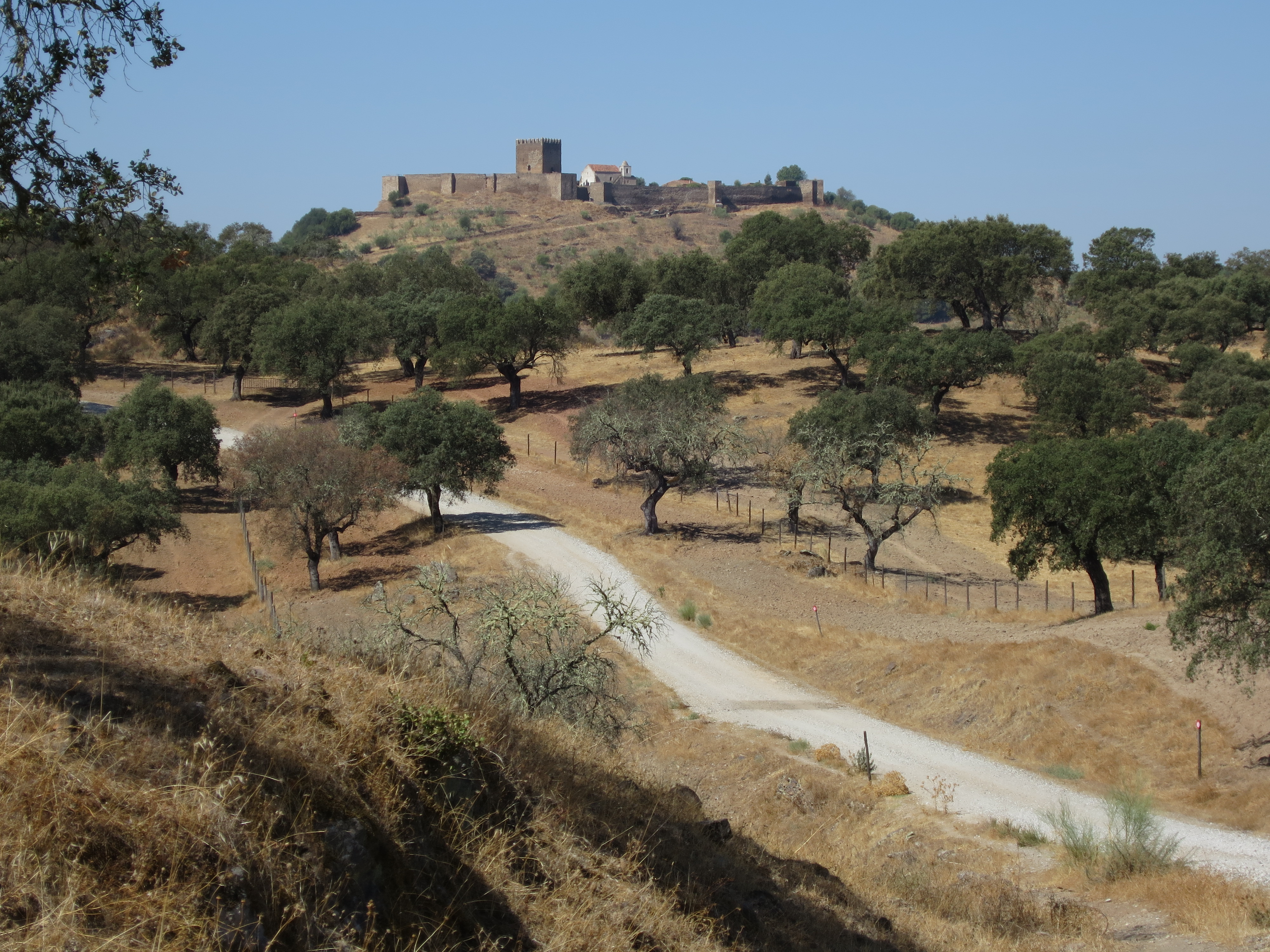
Castle of Noudar uphill

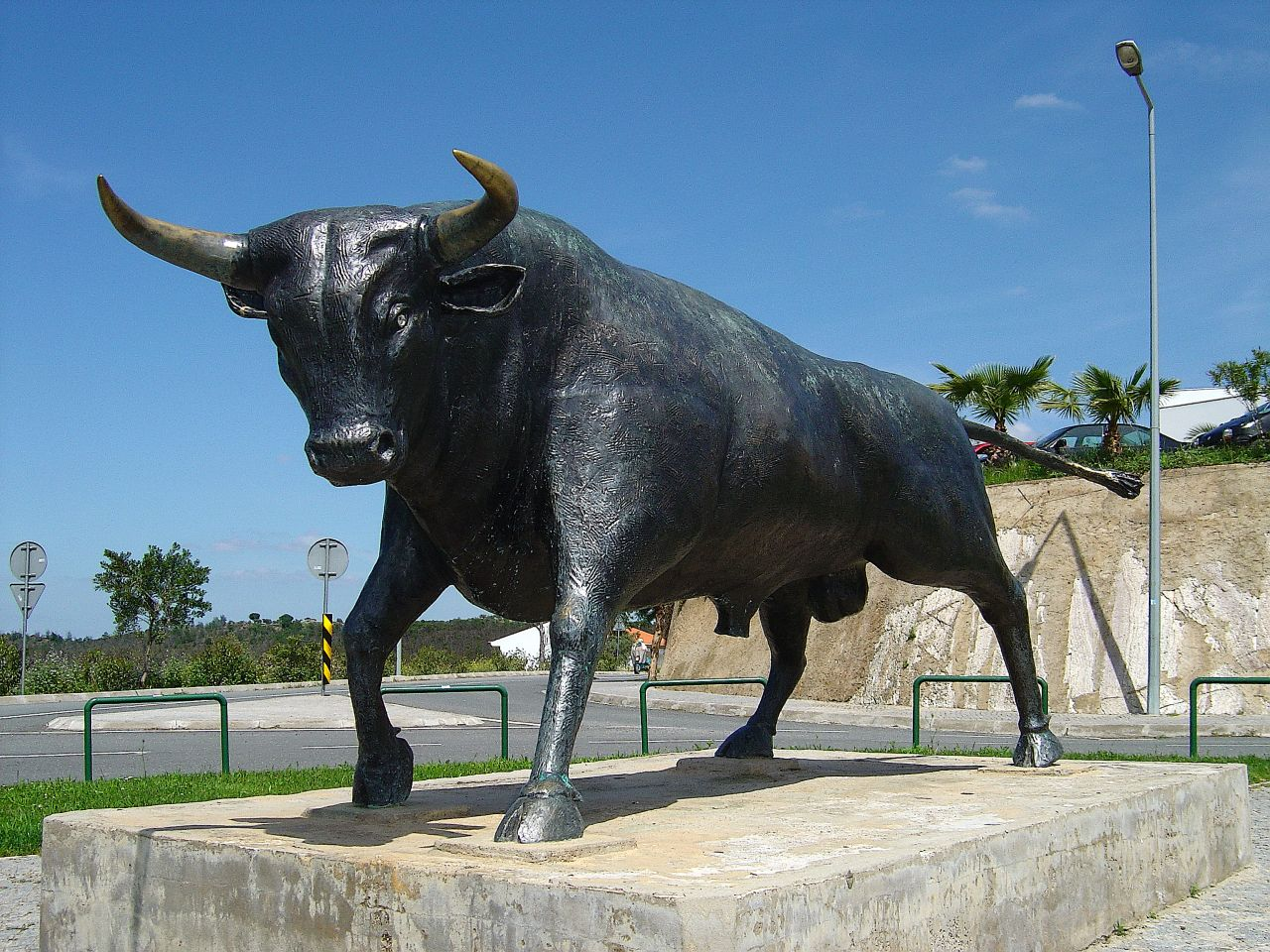
Monument to the bull
