= Barrancos ham =

Barrancos ham (Presunto de Barrancos) is a traditional ham in Portuguese cuisine, specifically from the village of Barrancos. It holds a protected designation of origin, according to European Union regulations.

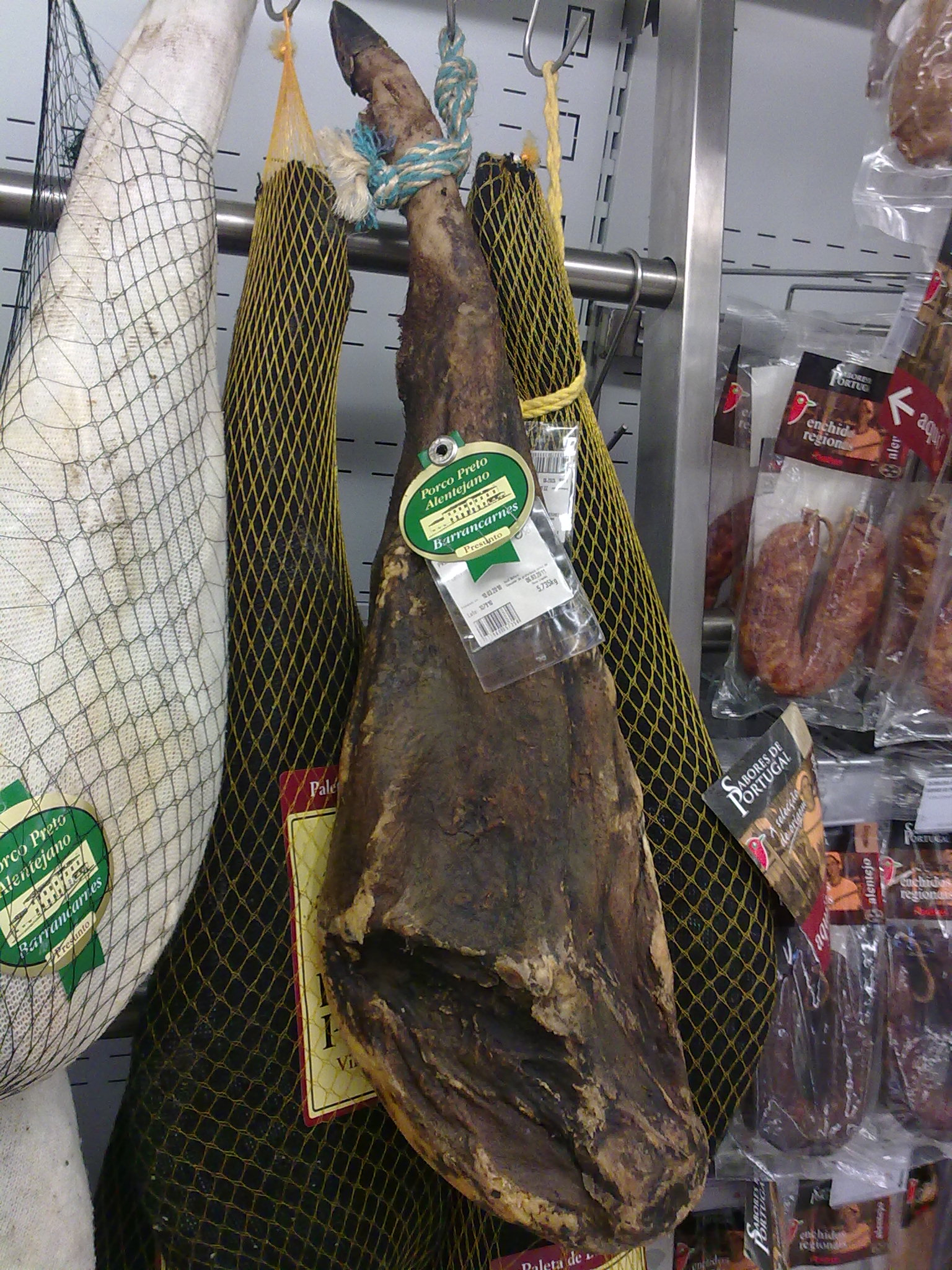
Presunto de Barrancos

It's prepared using hind legs of pigs from the so-called Alentejana breed (Sus ibericus), fed with acorns. The legs are salted, dried, and cured, without undergoing any smoking process, and they must weigh over 6 kg when still fresh. They have a distinct end shape obtained through elongated cutting, trimmed to a point or beak.

After the curing process, the hams must weigh no less than 5 kg. The color should range from pink to purplish red, with visible fat among the muscular mass. The taste is mild, lightly salty, and sometimes has a slightly spicy aftertaste. The texture is not very fibrous and therefore tender.

The curing process can take between 6 months and 2 years, with hams cured for nearly 2 years considered reserve-grade.

The geographical area for Barrancos ham transformation is limited to the Barrancos Municipality, whose location in the Peninsular interior at an altitude of 350 meters provides the ideal natural conditions for drying and maturing this product.

As a symbol of its protected designation of origin, Barrancos hams are marked with the cross of the Order of Avis using branding iron.
