= Moura Photovoltaic Power Station =

Photovoltaic power station in Amareleja,

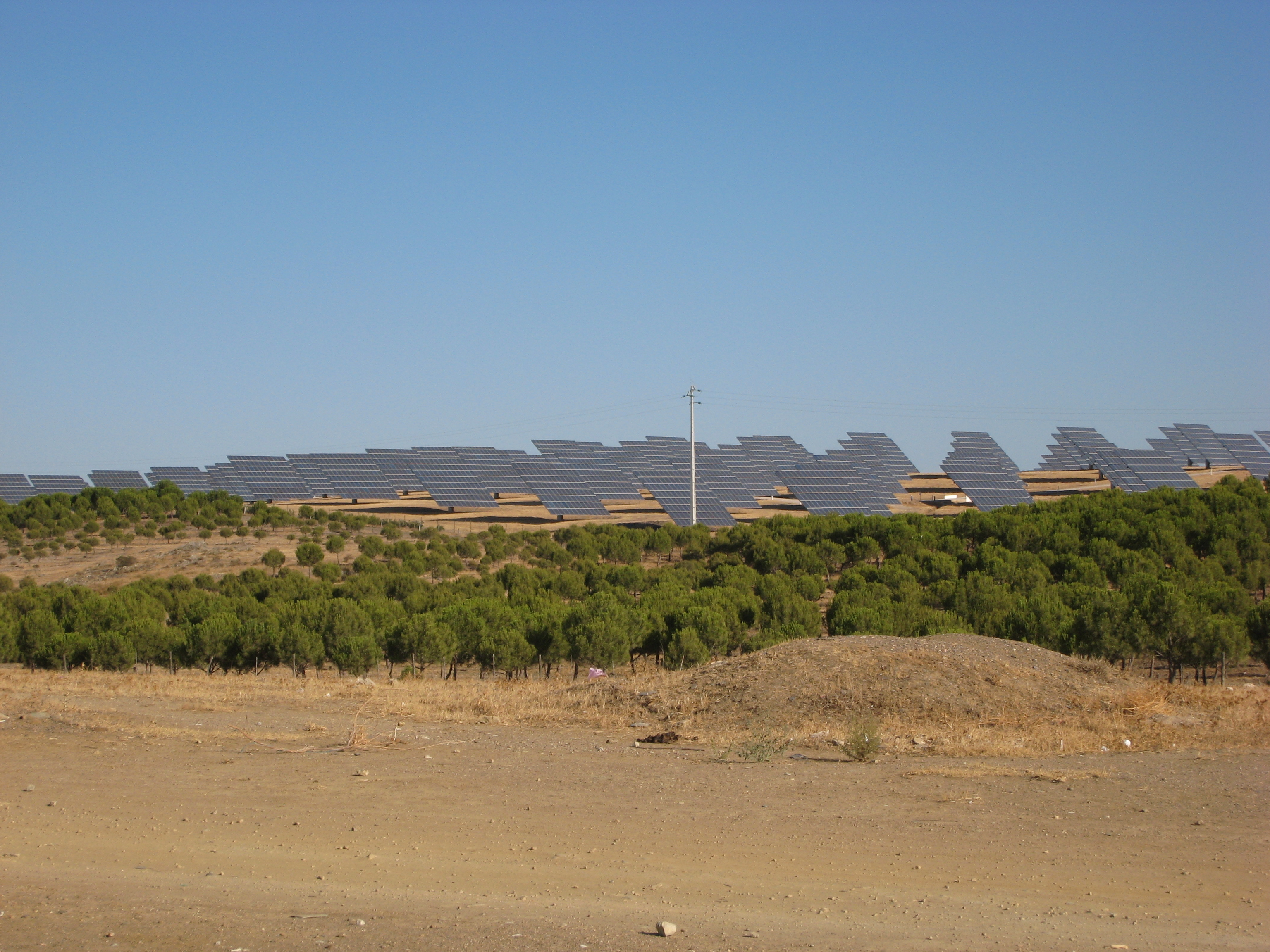
- Country: Portugal
- Location: Amareleja
- Coordinates: 38°11′20″N 7°12′08″W
- Status: Operational
- Commission date: Phase-1: 2008; Phase-2: 2010
- Construction cost: €250 million

Solar farm
- Type: Flat-panel PV
- Site area: 618 acres (250 ha)

Power generation
- Units operational: 376,000
- Nameplate capacity: 62 MW

The Moura Photovoltaic Power Station (also known as Amareleja Photovoltaic Power Station) is a large photovoltaic power station in Amareleja, in the municipality of Moura, Portugal. It is one of the largest power stations of its kind, and is built in one of the sunniest regions in Europe. Its construction involved two stages: stage 1 was completed in 2008 after 13 months, and stage 2 was completed in 2010. The entire project exceeded a total cost of €250 million.

Stage 2 of the project involved the construction of a further 20 MW of solar panels. It occupies an area of 618 acres (250 ha), and is capable of producing 93 GWh of electrical energy annually (10 MW average - equivalent to the electricity consumption of 15,000 Europeans).

The power station has an installed capacity of 62 MWp, with more than 376,000 solar panels. Approximately 190,000 panels (32 MW) are fitted on fixed structures, and 52,000 panels (10 MW) are fixed on single-axis trackers.

A €7.6 million solar panel factory, located in Moura, was constructed by Acciona, which provided panels for Stage 2 of the station construction. Its future production is targeted at the international market, with a capacity of producing 24 MW of solar panels annually.

== See also ==
- Energy policy of the European Union
- List of largest power stations in the world
- Photovoltaic power stations
- Renewable energy commercialization
- Solar power in Portugal
- Solar power in the European Union
