= Encinasola =

- Municipality
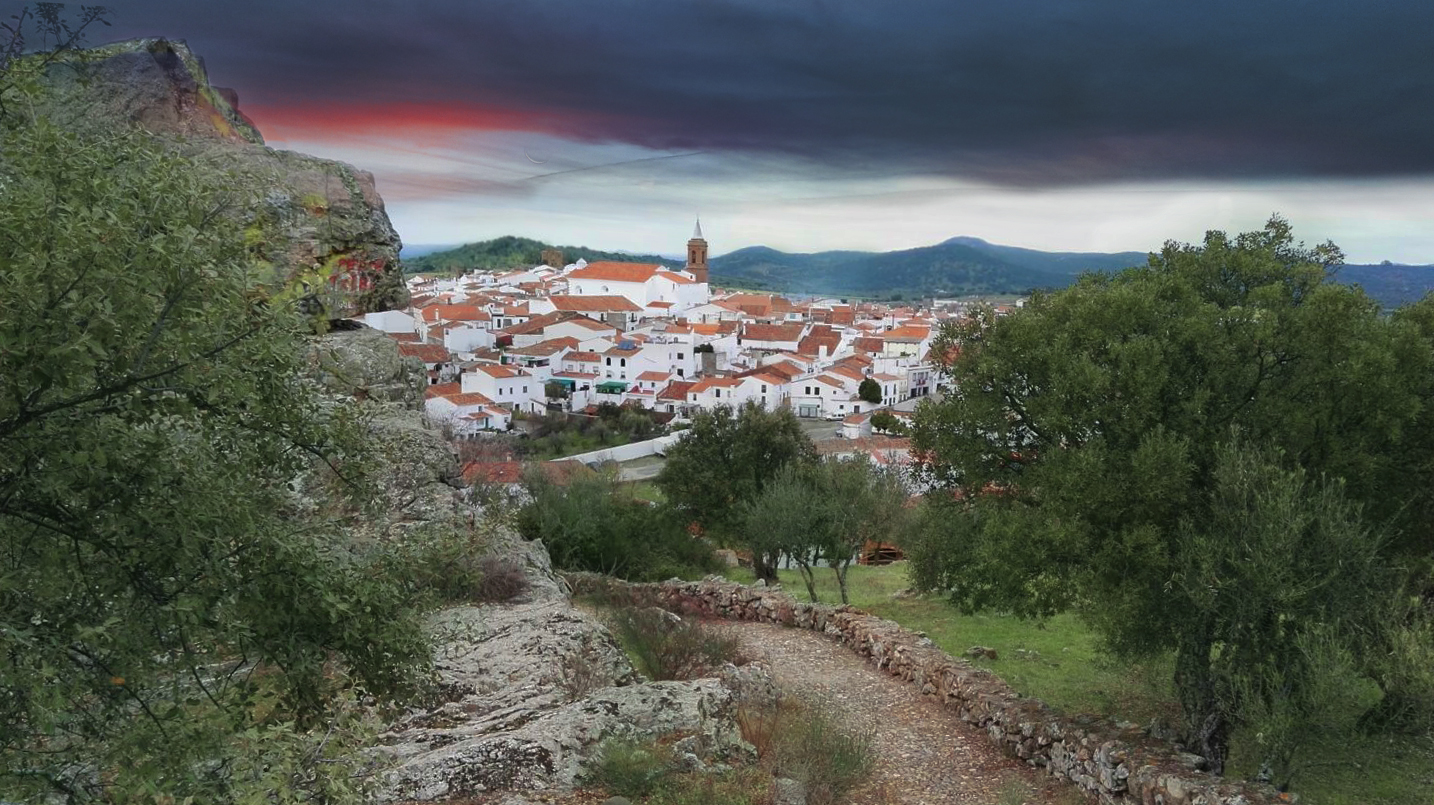

- Flag Coat of arms

- Location within Spain Location within Andalusia Location within Province of Huelva
- Coordinates: 38°8′6″N 6°52′20″W
- Country: Spain
- Autonomous community: Andalusia
- Province: Huelva

Area
  - Total: 177.76 km^{2} (68.63 sq mi)
- Elevation: 431 m (1,414 ft)

Population (2025-01-01)
  - Total: 1,232
  - Density: 6.931/km^{2} (17.95/sq mi)
- Time zone: UTC+1 (CET)
  - Summer (DST): UTC+2 (CEST)

Encinasola is a village and municipality of Spain belonging to the province of Huelva, in the autonomous community of Andalusia. According to the 2025 municipal register, the municipality has a population of 1,232 inhabitants.

The municipality shares a border with the Portuguese municipality of Barrancos. The details of the Spanish–Portuguese border concerning Moura, Barrancos, Encinasola and Aroche were officially settled in the 1926 Convention of Limits. By the 2010s, the demographic situation in the municipality was dire, with the 2014 population being around a 30% of the 1970 population.

The village lies at about 431 metres above sea level. The municipality spans across a total area of 177.76 km^{2}.

== People of Encinasola ==
- Abel Moreno Gómez: Musician
- Juan Gualberto González Bravo, Minister of Grace and Justice with Fernando VII

== See also ==
- List of municipalities in Huelva
