= Ardila =

River in the Portuguese-Spanish border

Coordinates: 38°12′N 7°28′W

Ardila River. Moura, Portugal

The Ardila (Spanish pronunciation: [aɾˈðila]; Portuguese pronunciation: [ɐɾˈðilɐ]) is a river of Spain and Portugal and a tributary of the Guadiana. Its length is 166 kilometres (103 mi). A portion of the river forms the Portugal–Spain border.
