= Molano =

Molano is a Spanish-language surname. Notable people with the name include:

- Alex Molano (born 1992), American professional soccer player
- Diego Molano Aponte (born 1970), Colombian politician
- Diego Molano Vega (born 1967), Colombian politician
- Ericson Alexander Molano (born 1979), Spanish Christian singer
- Juan Minaya Molano (born 1941), Colombian chess player
- Juan Sebastián Molano (born 1994), Colombian road racing cyclist
- Marta Lozano Molano (born 1985), Spanish composer of social music
- Willie Molano (born 1961), Colombian footballer
