= Cáceres, Spain =

Cáceres
- Municipality
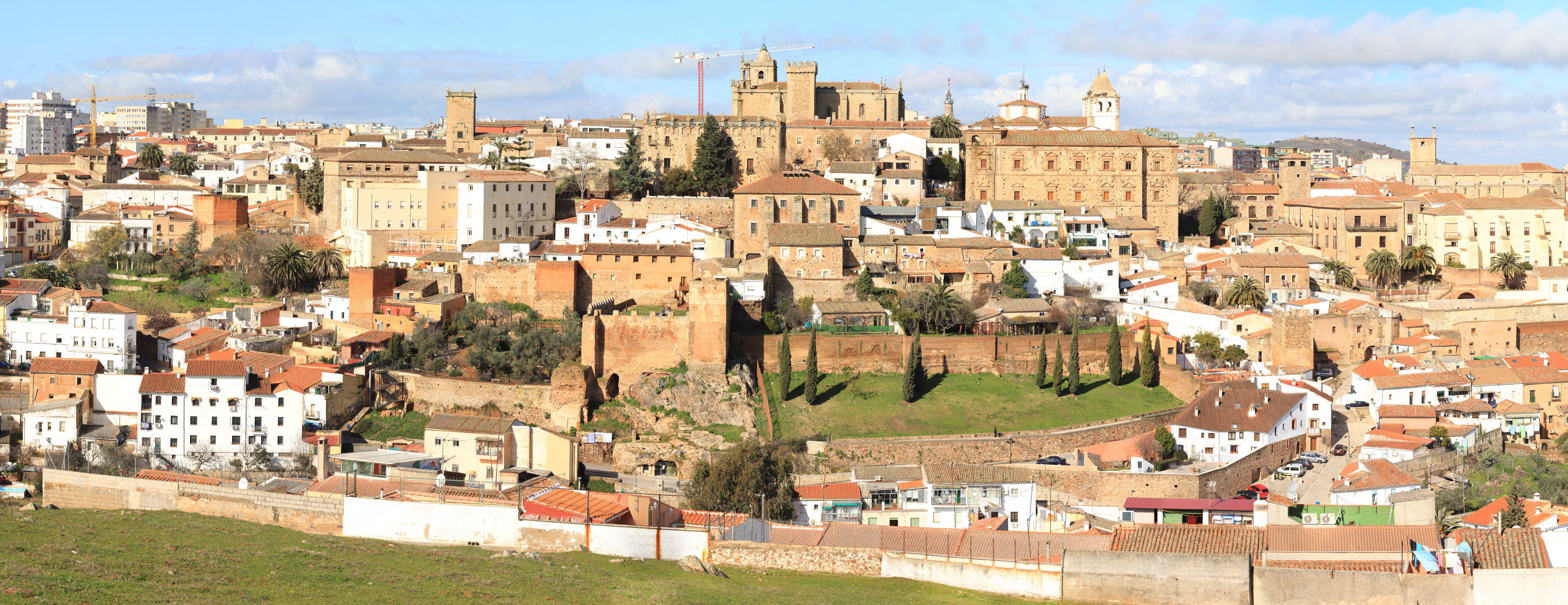
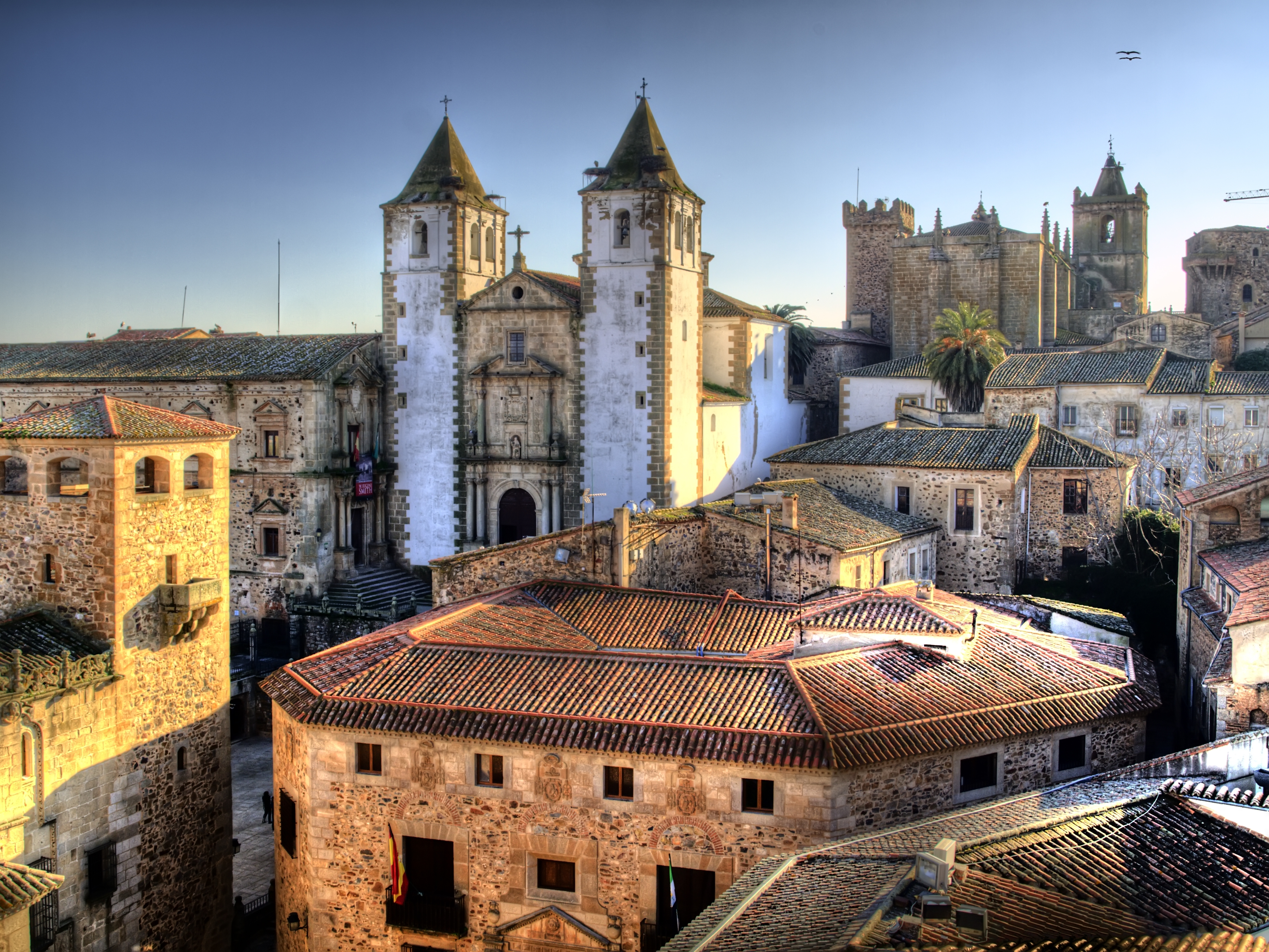
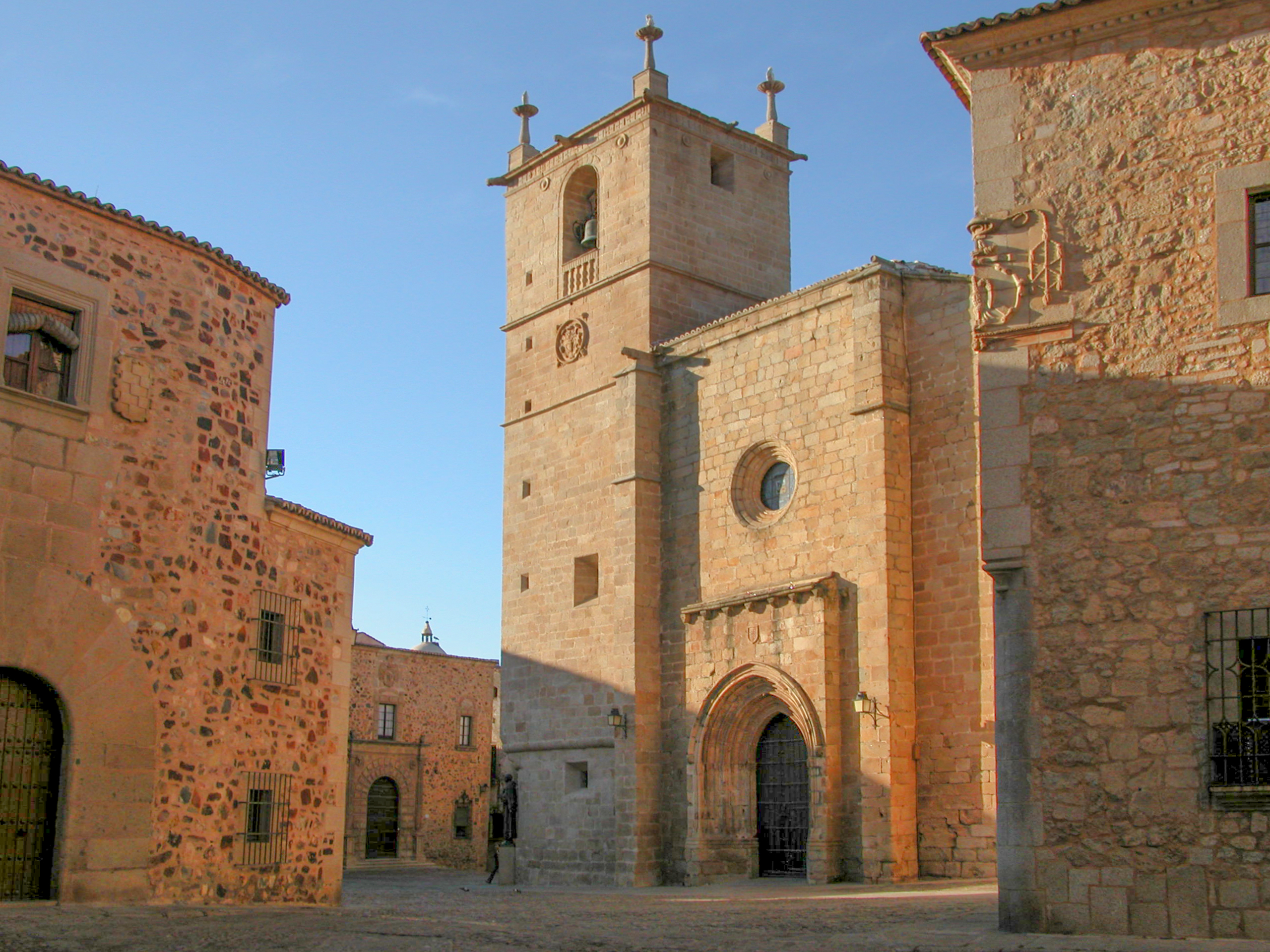
- View of Cáceres San Francisco Church Cathedral

- Flag Coat of arms
- Interactive map of Cáceres
- Coordinates: 39°29′N 6°22′W
- Country: Spain
- Autonomous community: Extremadura
- Province: Cáceres

Government
  - Mayor: Luis Salaya (PSOE)

Area
  - Total: 1,750.23 km^{2} (675.77 sq mi)
- Elevation: 459 m (1,506 ft)

Population (2025)
  - Total: 96,598
  - Density: 55.192/km^{2} (142.95/sq mi)
- Demonym(s): Cacereños, -as
- Time zone: UTC+1 (CET)
  - Summer (DST): UTC+2 (CEST)
- Postal code: 10001-10005
- Website: www.ayto-caceres.es

UNESCO World Heritage Site
- Official name: Old Town of Cáceres
- Criteria: Cultural: iii, iv
- Reference: 384
- Inscription: 1986 (10th Session)
- Area: 60.63 ha (149.8 acres)

Cáceres (US: /ˈkɑːsəreɪs/ KAH-sə-rayss, Spanish: [ˈkaθeɾes]) is a city and municipality located in the center of the autonomous community of Extremadura in southern Spain. It is the capital and most populated municipality of the province of the same name and hosts the seat of the Extremadura's Regional Supreme Court.

Cáceres' area —1,750.33 km^{2} (675.81 sq mi) — is the greatest of any municipality in Spain. As of 2025, it has a population of 96,598 inhabitants, of which 95,441 live in the city itself. Numerous inhabited places are scattered throughout the municipality, including castles and farmhouses with several centuries of history. The medieval walled city was declared a World Heritage City by UNESCO in 1986.

Since 2008 the city has been organized into four districts: Old Town Center, North, West, and South; a fifth district, Pedanías, covers the non-urban part of the term. The actual municipal population data varies significantly, fluctuating by more than 30,000 people primarily related to educational centers such as the Cáceres Campus of the University of Extremadura or the CEFOT-1 of the Army. The city usually empties in summer, when many residents return to their towns of origin. Cáceres lies at the feet of the Sierra de la Mosca, a modest hill range. It is part of the Vía de la Plata ("Silver Route") path of the Camino de Santiago that crosses the west of the Iberian Peninsula in a north–south direction.

The Universidad de Extremadura, and two astronomical observatories are located in Cáceres, as well as several regional government departments. The city is also a co-see of the Catholic Diocese of Coria-Cáceres.

== Etymology ==
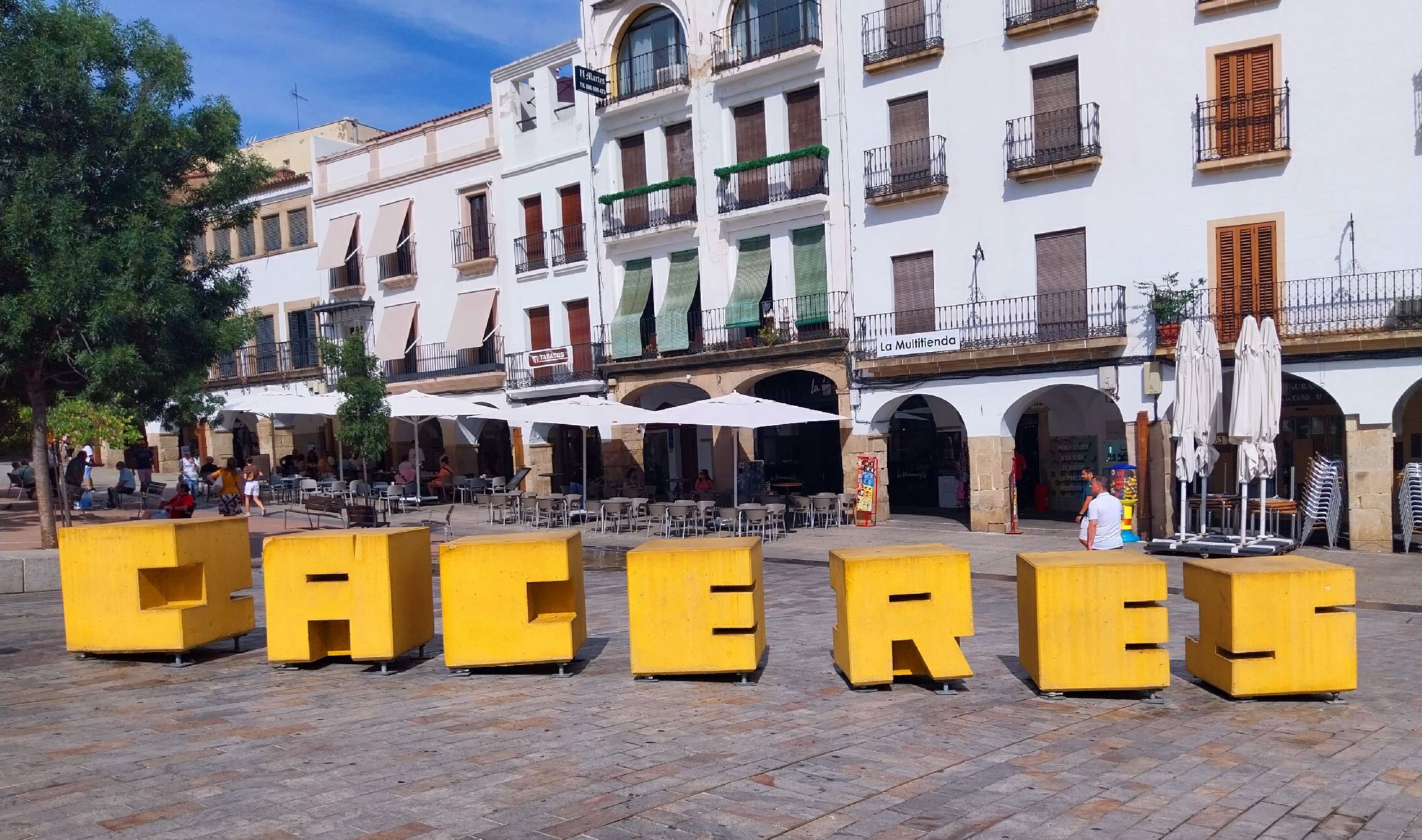
"Cáceres" letter art in the Main Plaza.

No consensus has been reached among historians regarding the etymology of Cáceres, some considering its origin as Roman and others as Arabic. Among philologists consensus is that it is Latin nomenclature distorted by Arabic, until finally adapting to the definitive Christian name, as occurred with at least half the place names of ancient origin in the southern Iberian Peninsula.

Regarding its possible Roman origin, two known Latin names could have evolved into the current "Cáceres." One possible derivation is from the colony "Norba Caesarina" (founded in 34 BC), "Norba" in honor of the hometown of Gaius Norbanus Flaccus, the Roman general who founded the town, and "Caesarina" in memory of Julius Caesar. The other is from "Castra Caecilia," given by the consul Quinto Cecilio Metelo Pío to one of the military camps near the colony. With any of these toponyms based on "castra" ("camp"), its ablative "castris," which means "in the camp", could have provided the original form of the current "Cáceres."

Historians have debated which of these is the true origin; until the 19th century it was mistakenly thought that Norba Caesarina was the neighboring town of Alcántara, while it was believed that the walled enclosure of Cáceres was Castra Caecilia.

Due to the documentary obscurity of the Visigoth period, it is unclear which was the name for Caceres when the Muslim armies arrived. Documents from the 3rd and 4th Centuries indicate that the name of the area had been shortened to the colloquial form of "Castris."

The Ravenna Cosmography fixes the use of "Castris" in the 4th century; however, the following mentions of the locality reappear in Muslim texts:

- The Baghdadi geographer Ibn Hawqal referred to a locality called "ḥiṣn Qāṣras" in this place.
- A century and a half later, Al-Idrisi from Ceuta reiterates this name.
- A third source from the end of the Muslim period, written in the late 12th century or early 13th century by Yaqut, suggests that it was renamed قصر إيش (Qaṣr Īsh).

In any case, sources from the time are scarce, since the Muslims never considered Cáceres as an important town beyond its use as a military fortification.

Both the transliteration of the Arabic toponym into the Latin alphabet and the creation of a name in the Romance languages were disparate. In some ancient writings and medieval documents various names appear, such as:

- "Caceres" in a bull of 1168 by Pope Alexander III, awarding the territory to the diocese of Coria in the first Leonese conquest;
- "Castes" in a Castilian document from 1171 by King Alfonso VIII, through which he recognized the Fratres of Cáceres as owners of the land;
- "Carceres" in the mandate of Alfonso IX of León dated in the year 1222 (however, the same king adopts the form "Caceres" in another document of the same year signed during the siege);
- "Canceres" written the document of 1229 through which Alfonso IX gave concessions to the Order of Santiago.

== History ==
Visitors can see remains from Prehistoric, medieval times, the Roman occupation, Moorish occupation and the Golden age of Jewish culture in Spain. Cáceres has four main areas to be explored: the Historical Quarter, the Jewish Quarter, the Modern Center, and the Outskirts.

=== Prehistoric ===
Settlements have existed near Cáceres since prehistoric times. Evidence can be found in the caves of Maltravieso and El Conejar.

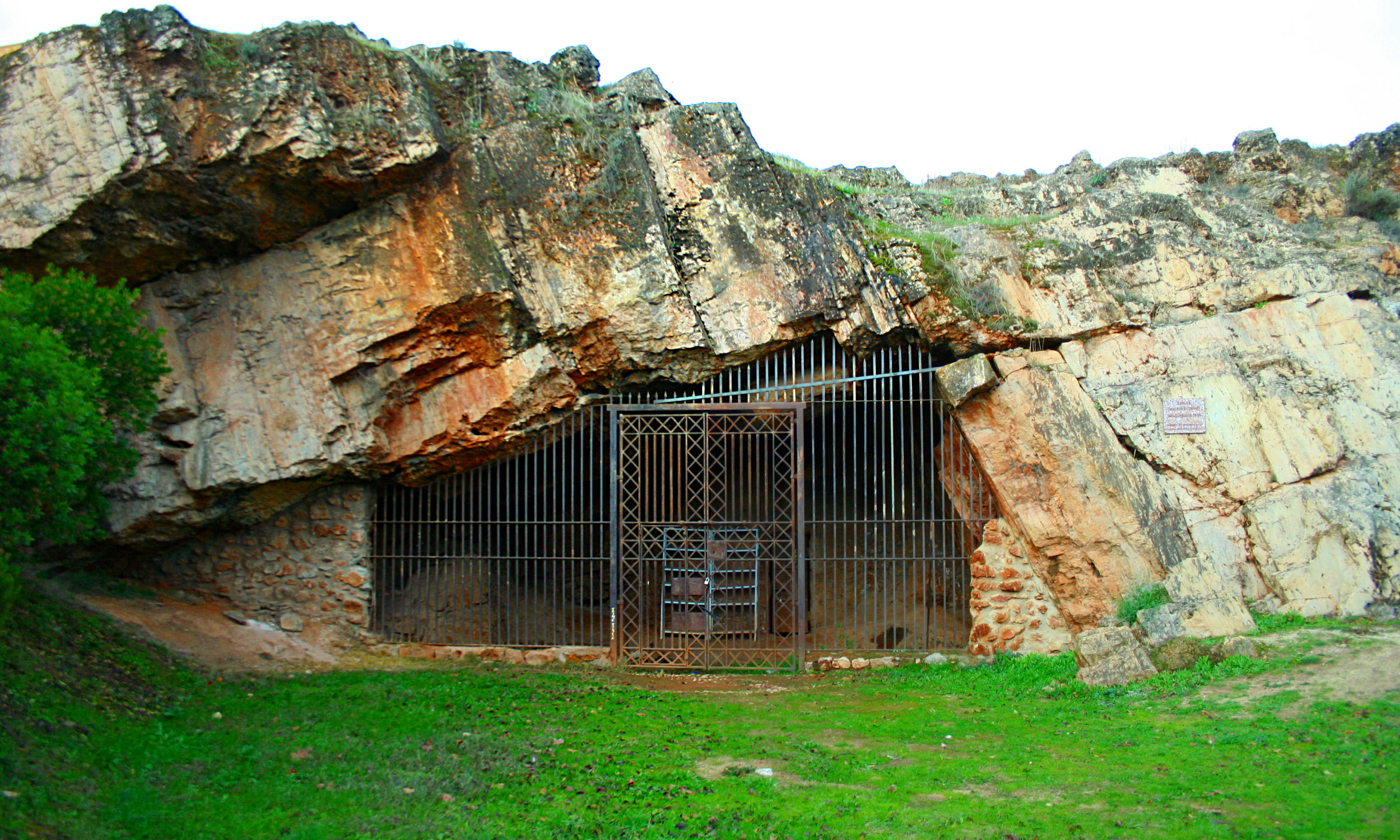
Maltravieso Cave.

The Maltravieso Cave (revealed in 1951 by blasting at a limestone quarry; its paintings were discovered in 1956 by the academic and official chronicler of Cáceres Carlos Callejo) contains hundreds of paintings, including the world's oldest known cave painting, a red hand stencil older than 67,000 years. This is 20,000 years before the known arrival of Homo Sapiens to Europe, and therefore is believed to have been made by Neanderthals. These paintings date to several of the Upper Paleolithic periods.

In the nearby El Conejar cave, ceramics and lithic utensils have been found that date the occupation of the cave to the Ancient Neolithic (VI-V millennium BC); the possibility that the cave was occupied during the Epipaleolithic period should not be ruled out. Location of trepanned skulls and decorated ceramics suggest that the Maltravieso cave was also occupied during the Bronze Age.

=== Roman rule ===
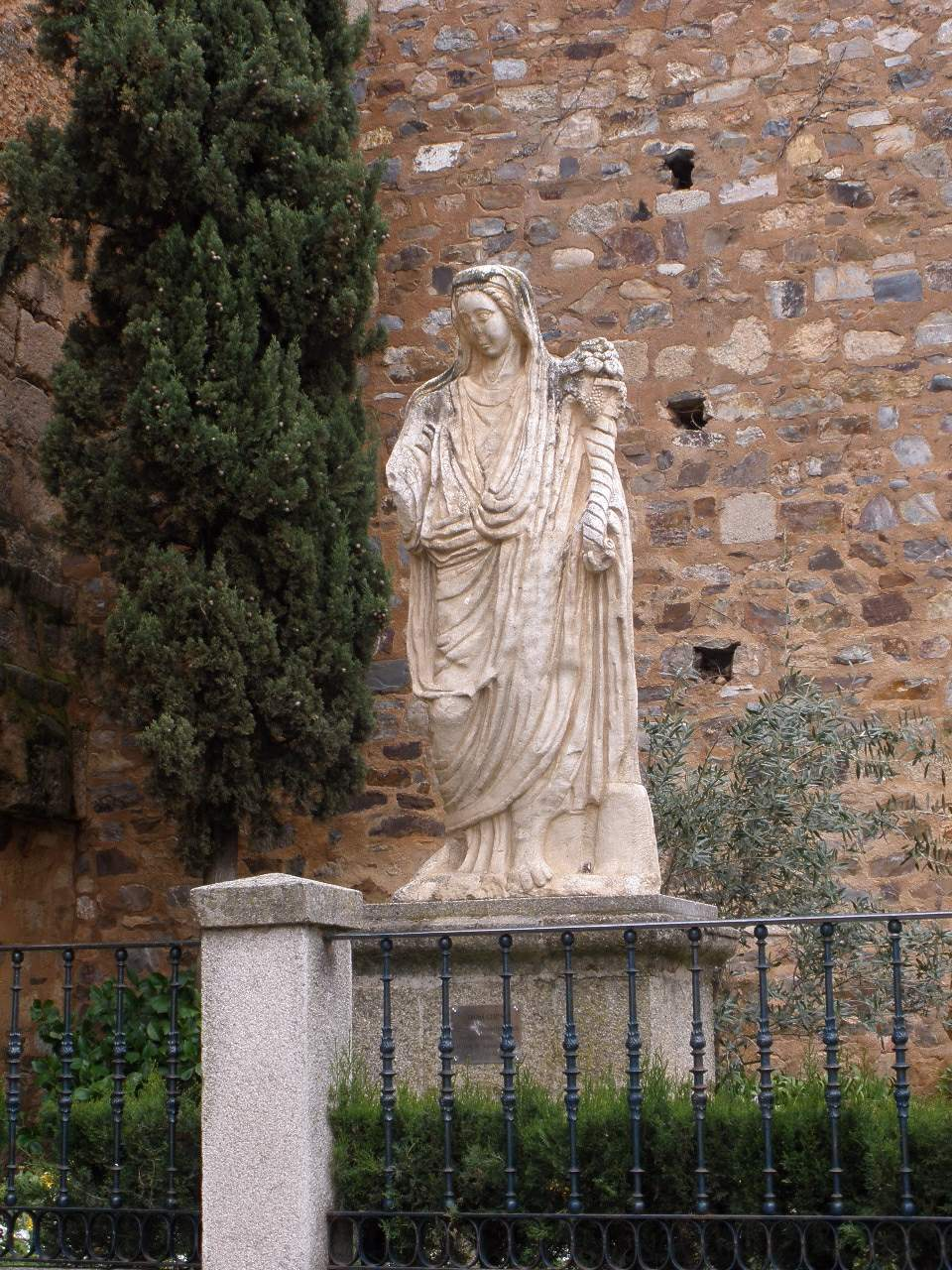
The Androgynous Genius, a Roman statue located in the Balbos Forum in Cáceres

The city was founded by the Romans in 25 BCE. Cáceres as a city was founded as Castra Caecilia by Quintus Caecilius Metellus Pius and started to gain importance as a strategic city under Roman occupation. Remains found in the city suggest that it was a thriving center as early as 25 BCE. Some remains of the first city walls built by the Romans in the 3rd and 4th Centuries still exist, including one gateway, the Arco de Cristo.

During the 1st Century BCE the Romans settled in camps (Castra Cecilia and Castra Servilia) permanently around the hill where the Norba Caesarina colony would be located next to the important communications route that would later be known as Vía de la Plata.

The old municipality of Aldea Moret, 2 km to the southwest, is currently a neighborhood of the same name integrated into the city, around which two Roman archaeological sites can be seen: Cuarto Roble and El Junquillo. The signposted Vía de la Plata can be traveled south of the city. An excavated section in Valdesalor, where the road crosses the Salor River through a recently restored medieval bridge, occupies the place of an ancient Roman bridge, now lost.

After the fall of the Western Roman Empire, the city was occupied by the Visigoths, until the Arabs conquered Cáceres in the 8th Century. The city spent the next few centuries mostly under Arab rule, although power alternated several times between Moors and Christians. During this time, the Arabs rebuilt the city, comprising a wall, palaces, and various towers, including the Torre de Bujaco. Cáceres was reconquered by the Christians in the 13th Century (1229).

During this period the city had an important Jewish Quarter: in the 15th Century when the total population was 2,000, nearly 140 Jewish families lived in Cáceres. The Jewish population was expelled by Queen Isabel I (Isabella I) of Castile and Fernando II (Ferdinand II) of Aragon in 1492, but many remains of the Jewish presence of the period can still be seen today in the Barrio San Antonio.

=== Middle Ages ===
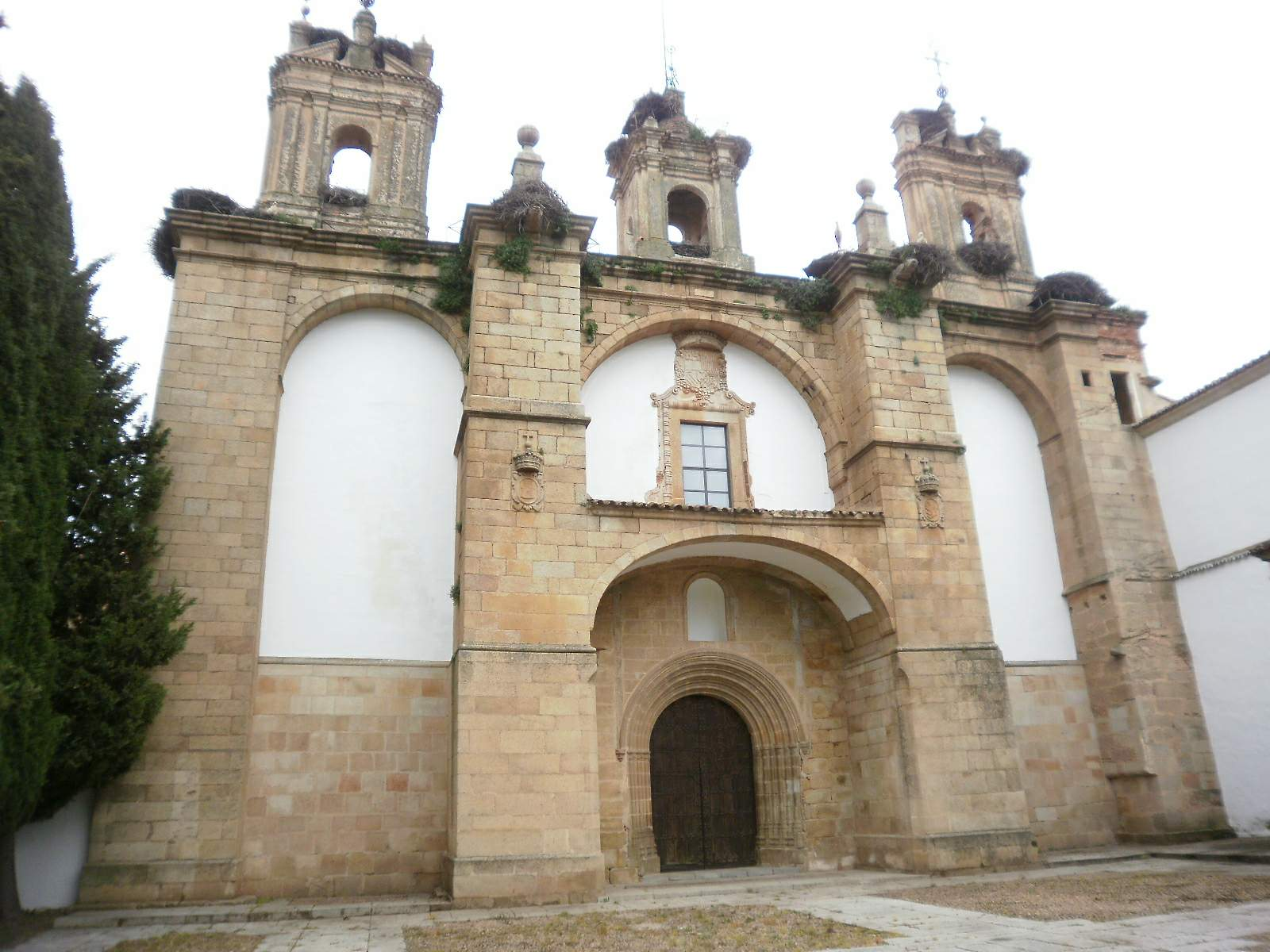
Monastery of San Francisco el Real, today integrated into the urban area but originally built outside the town in the 15th century.

Around the 5th Century, the Visigoths devastated the Roman settlement; until the 8th-9th Centuries, the city was not heard of again.

During the first centuries of their conquista of the Península, the Muslims from North Africa took advantage of the strategic place where the primitive Roman colony had been based as a military base to confront the Christian kingdoms of the north. Thus, in 1147 Abd al-Mumin refounded the city on the Hispano-Roman and Visigoth remains. The current name of Vía de la Plata derived from the Arabic name for the Roman road that linked Astorga with Mérida: from the Arabic "balata" (road), from which the word "silver" was derived.

The Christian Reconquest of Cáceres occurred in 1229, the result of a long process spanning from the second half of the 12th century to the beginning of the 13th century. During this period, which began in 1142 with the conquest of Coria, the Tagus River marked an unstable border between Christians to the north and Muslims to the south. The Kingdom of Castile partly ignored the possibilities of conquering this area; attempts to incorporate Cáceres came from the Kingdom of Portugal and the Kingdom of León, which both wanted to expand the width of their southern expansions. The Portuguese Geraldo Sempavor conquered Cáceres in the mid-12th Century in a campaign that began in 1165 and reached the entire center of present-day Extremadura, but an alliance between Ferdinand II of León and the Almohads gave the Leonese control of the town in 1170.

The Almohads carried out an expedition in 1174 in which they regained control of Cáceres. Except for an attempted siege in 1183, the Leonese did not approach the Muslim town again until the 13th Century. After the Battle of Las Navas de Tolosa in 1212, the conquest of Alcántara took place in 1213, after which the Christians besieged Cáceres in 1218, 1222, 1223 and 1225, producing the definitive Reconquest on 23 April 1229. Although the conquest was led by Alfonso IX of León, with Cáceres becoming part of the Kingdom of León, the death of Alfonso IX in 1230 led to Cáceres becoming part of the Crown of Castile and León.

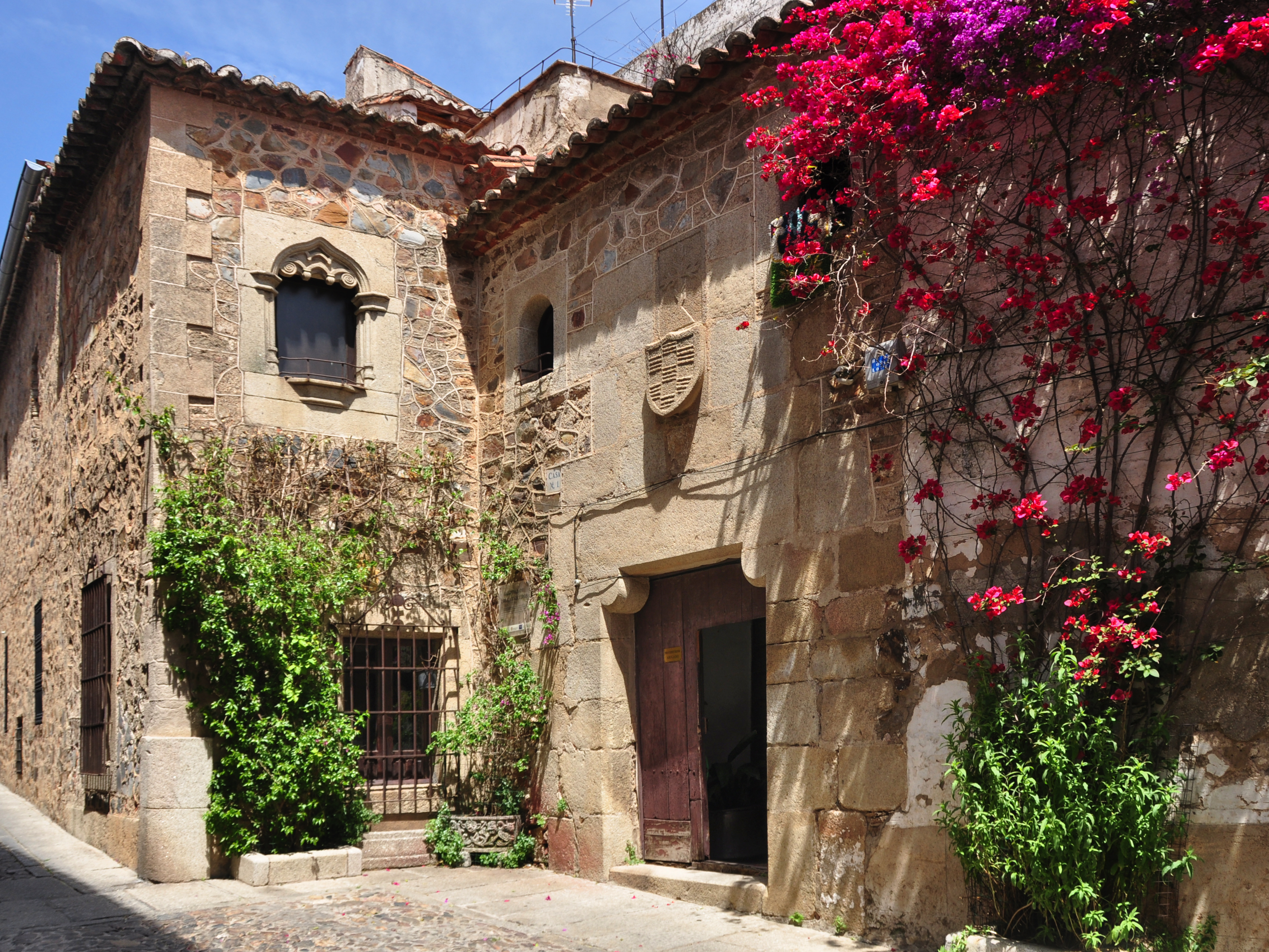
Hospital of the Knights, in the old town of Cáceres

The privileges of the reconquered town were granted by Alfonso IX, configuring Cáceres as a royal town directly dependent on the Leonese Crown with no local government other than its own council. Through this jurisdiction, the Crown reserved a notable portion of land between the Order of Santiago and the Order of Alcántara.

Cáceres flourished during the Reconquista and the Discovery of the Americas, as influential Spanish families and nobles built homes and small palaces there, and many members of families from Extremadura participated in voyages to the Americas where they made their fortunes.

In the 15th Century, the city suffered from internal disputes among the nobility. The Catholic Monarchs issued several ordinances and provisions to try to pacify the local nobles; The most notable was issued by Isabel I (Isabella I) in 1477, during her stay in the town during the War of the Castilian Succession, whereby it was established that the twelve aldermen of the council would become perpetual. The prohibition of stately properties in this jurisdiction prevented the formation of a strong nobility, leaving the town governed by a mesocracy of agricultural knights.

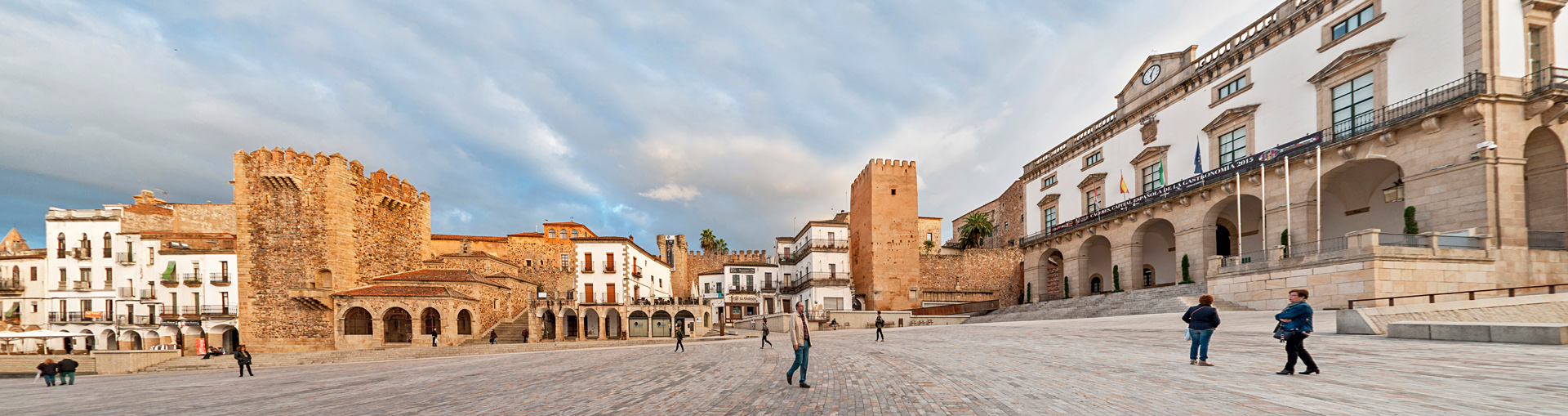
The Plaza Mayor with the Bujaco tower, the Púlpitos tower, the Herb tower and the town hall.

The Old Town (Parte Antigua) still has its ancient walls; this part of town is also well known for its multitude of storks' nests. The walls contain a medieval town setting with no outward signs of modernity, conducive to many television shows and films being shot there.

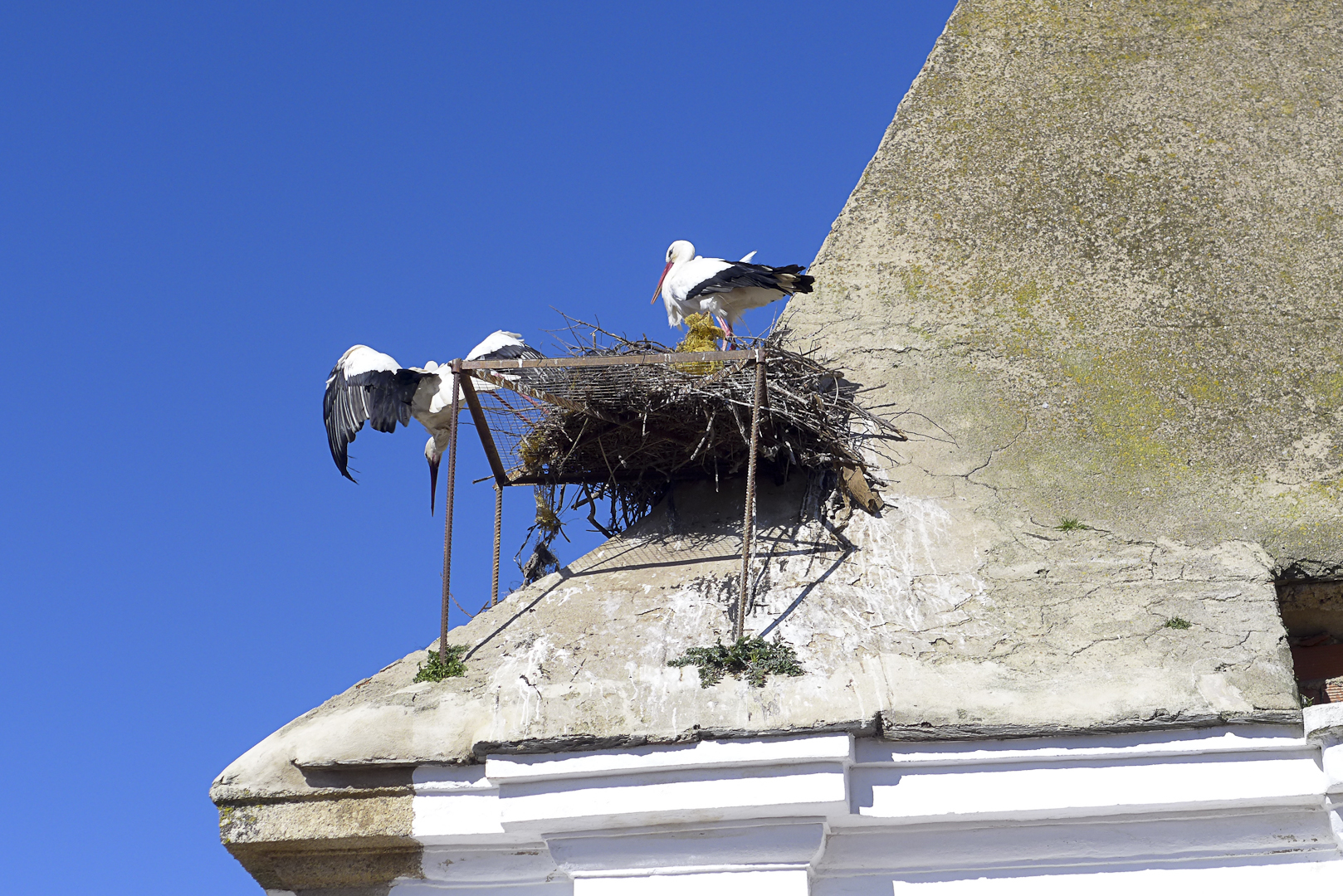
Stork nests on rooftops are a common sight in Old Town Cáceres.

Cáceres was declared a World Heritage City by UNESCO in 1986 because of the city's blend of Roman, Moorish, Northern Gothic and Italian Renaissance architecture. Thirty towers from the Islamic period still stand in Cáceres, of which the Torre del Bujaco is the most famous.

=== Modern Age ===
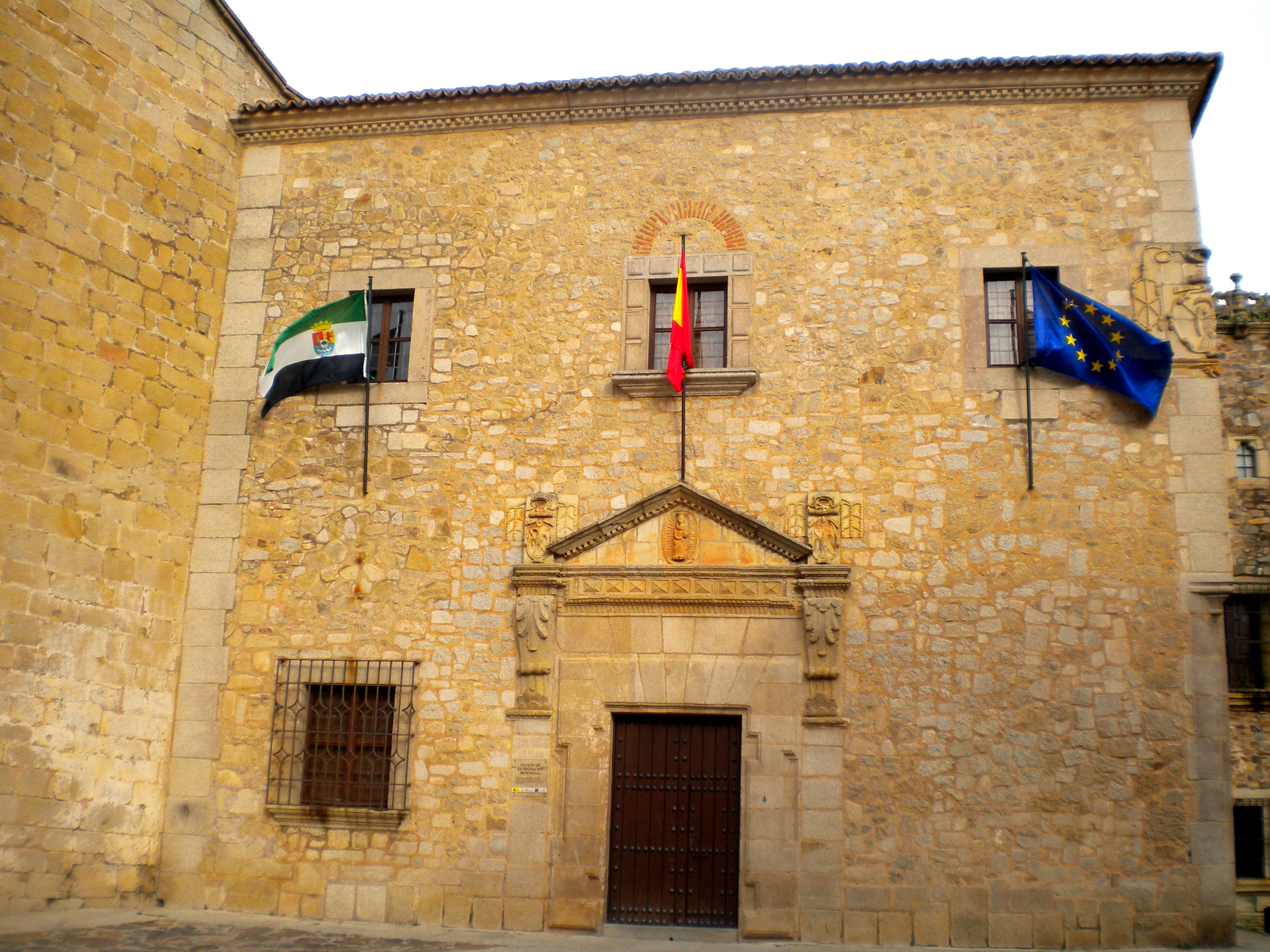
Cáceres Provincial Palace

During the War of the Communities of Castile, Caceres joined the rebel ranks. On 15 April 1522, the monarch granted amnesty to the city, with the exception of the most committed community members.

In 1653 the town of Cáceres, along with five other towns in the current autonomous community, acquired a joint vote in the Cortes of Castile, giving rise to the purchase of the vote to the province of Extremadura, which in 1822 would be divided into those of Cáceres and Badajoz. Cáceres was represented in the Cortes of Madrid from 1660 to 1664 as part of said joint vote.

Until the 18th Century, Cáceres was just another town among the many in Extremadura. In the Cadastre of Ensenada, carried out in Cáceres in 1753, it is indicated that only 1,698 families lived in the town itself. However, during the second half of the 18th Century, the town began to grow, motivated by the arrival of both temporary and permanent foreign settlers, whose presence gave rise to the formation of a local bourgeoisie that until then did not exist due to the rural nature of the population. Starting in the mid-18th Century, ranchers from the center of the peninsula, many of them from the Sierra de Cameros, began to settle in Extremadura, fleeing the crisis suffered by transhumance. Prominent textile merchants from Cameros and Catalonia also settled here.

=== Promotion to city ===
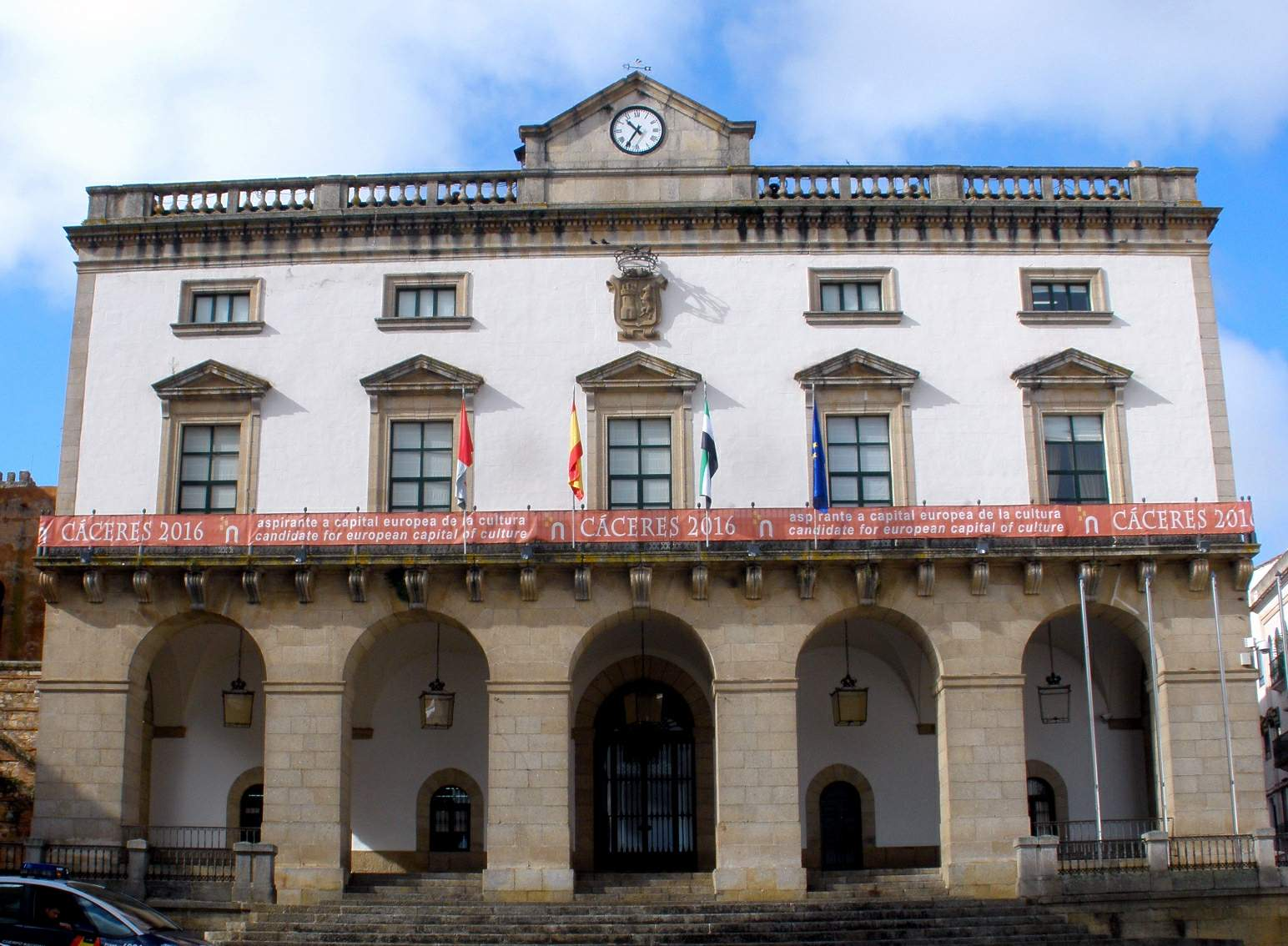
Cáceres City hall, located on the Plaza Mayor

In 1790 a decisive event occurred in the history of Cáceres that made it evolve over time from a simple town to a city with regional importance: Charles IV established there the headquarters of the Royal Court of Extremadura, the highest judicial body of the region. Numerous officials and professionals from very different places in Spain began to settle in the town, which increased the weight of the local bourgeoisie. At the beginning of the 19th Century, merchant neighborhoods could already be distinguished in the Old Town extramuros (outside the walls), with their houses located in the Plaza Mayor and in several surrounding streets, such as Barrionuevo, Empedrada, Parras, Pintores and Santo Domingo.

The judiciary was not the only public sector to provide urban character at that time: the defective division into provinces of the Crown of Castile caused many enlightened people to demand the division of Extremadura into two provinces, which benefited Cáceres by establishing itself as the provincial capital. In 1810, the French tried to create the prefecture of Cáceres during the Peninsular War, with limits similar to those of the current province. Ten years later and during the Liberal Triennium in 1822 the province of Cáceres was created with its capital in this town.

=== Civil war ===
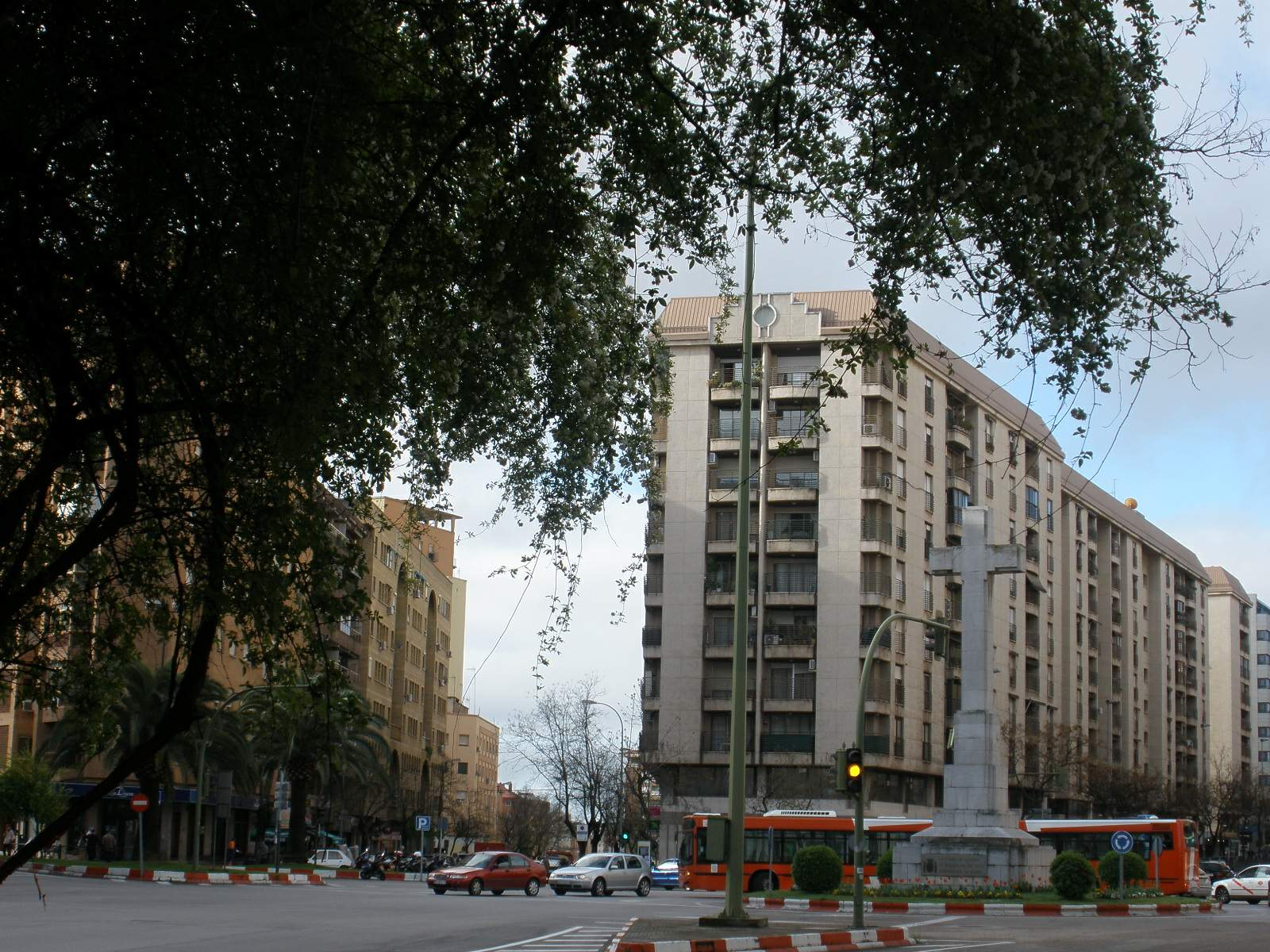
Plaza of América and Monumental Cross to the Civil War Fallen in Cáceres

In the Spanish Civil War, the military forces of Cáceres supported the coup d'état of 1936. When the rebel forces freed the Falangist Luna, he mobilized about a thousand sympathizers in the city and began to issue orders to occupy the principal surrounding towns, as well as the capture of the main strategic points such as the border points with Portugal, ports, and bridges. The repression by the Francoists began immediately, with the assassination of the director of Union and Labor, Pedro Montero Rubio, and the mayor of Cáceres Antonio Canales González, among others, a total of more than 600 people shot, about 220 during Christmas 1937. The constitutional governor and mayor were imprisoned and replaced by soldiers; the first, Ignacio Mateos Guija, was shot dead by Falangists and four relatives were thrown into the Tagus River, and the business run by his father was illegally confiscated.

The uprising in Cáceres facilitated General Francisco Franco's advance along the roads of Mérida and Badajoz. On 26 August 1936, General Franco arrived in Cáceres, where he established his headquarters before beginning the advance on Madrid. There he received his wife Carmen and his daughter, whom he had not seen since the day of the military coup d'état. Between 8 and 10 October 1936, and on the occasion of Franco's request for military aid to Hitler, The first Panzer I model battle tanks arrived at the Arguijuelas de Abajo and Arriba castles, which had arrived in Seville by boat. For several months, a training academy for armored vehicle drivers was established in the castles, directed by the German colonel Wilhelm von Thoma. Later the training academy was moved to Cubas de la Sagra, in the province of Madrid and its military equipment took part in combat near the Madrid fronts. The Cáceres airfield also had important air movements, from which the aircraft that attacked the Republican forces and the Condor Legion departed.

One of the few reactions of the Republican forces was the bombing of the city on 23 July 1937. That day five Soviet twin-engine Tupolev aircraft under the command of Lieutenant Colonel Jaume Mata Romeu, of the Air Force of the Spanish Republic, which had taken off from the Los Llanos de Albacete airfield, dropped 18 bombs, which affected various buildings (such as the Mayorazgo Palace), the food market, Santa María, the back of the Civil Guard barracks, the town hall, and Nido and Sancti Espíritu streets, causing 35 deaths and numerous injuries.

== Climate ==
The city of Cáceres is located in the province of Cáceres, in the Extremadura region of western central Spain. The city has a Hot-summer Mediterranean climate (Köppen: Csa), which is tempered by its proximity to the Atlantic Ocean. In winter the average temperature does not exceed 14 °C (57 °F) maximum, reaching 8 °C (46 °F) minimum, with some frost. In summer the average maximum temperature is 34 °C (93 °F) and the average minimum is 19 °C (66 °F). Rainfall is abundant in the months of October, November, March, April and May, but very intermittent.

Climate data for Cáceres, 459 m asl (1991–2020, extremes since 1920)
Month	Jan	Feb	Mar	Apr	May	Jun	Jul	Aug	Sep	Oct	Nov	Dec	Year
Record high °C (°F)	21.2 (70.2)	23.0 (73.4)	26.8 (80.2)	34.4 (93.9)	36.6 (97.9)	42.0 (107.6)	44.0 (111.2)	44.3 (111.7)	42.6 (108.7)	37.0 (98.6)	27.2 (81.0)	21.0 (69.8)	44.3 (111.7)
Mean daily maximum °C (°F)	12.2 (54.0)	14.2 (57.6)	17.6 (63.7)	19.9 (67.8)	24.5 (76.1)	30.3 (86.5)	34.0 (93.2)	33.7 (92.7)	28.7 (83.7)	22.4 (72.3)	16.1 (61.0)	12.7 (54.9)	22.2 (72.0)
Daily mean °C (°F)	8.1 (46.6)	9.4 (48.9)	12.3 (54.1)	14.3 (57.7)	18.3 (64.9)	23.2 (73.8)	26.4 (79.5)	26.3 (79.3)	22.3 (72.1)	17.3 (63.1)	11.8 (53.2)	8.8 (47.8)	16.6 (61.9)
Mean daily minimum °C (°F)	4.0 (39.2)	4.6 (40.3)	6.9 (44.4)	8.7 (47.7)	12.0 (53.6)	16.1 (61.0)	18.9 (66.0)	19.0 (66.2)	15.9 (60.6)	12.1 (53.8)	7.6 (45.7)	4.9 (40.8)	10.9 (51.6)
Record low °C (°F)	−5.6 (21.9)	−5.6 (21.9)	−3.6 (25.5)	−1.4 (29.5)	2.8 (37.0)	5.4 (41.7)	10.0 (50.0)	9.0 (48.2)	4.8 (40.6)	2.4 (36.3)	−2.2 (28.0)	−5.4 (22.3)	−5.6 (21.9)
Average precipitation mm (inches)	53.6 (2.11)	50.9 (2.00)	54.3 (2.14)	52.6 (2.07)	47.3 (1.86)	12.8 (0.50)	4.7 (0.19)	6.7 (0.26)	31.8 (1.25)	82.7 (3.26)	79.6 (3.13)	67.2 (2.65)	544.2 (21.42)
Average precipitation days (≥ 1.0 mm)	7.2	6.2	6.7	7.6	6.4	2.2	0.6	1.0	3.7	7.5	7.9	7.9	64.9
Mean monthly sunshine hours	156	185	232	260	310	353	391	359	274	214	163	137	3,034
Source: Météo Climat

Climate data for Cáceres, 459 m asl (1982-2010)
Month	Jan	Feb	Mar	Apr	May	Jun	Jul	Aug	Sep	Oct	Nov	Dec	Year
Record high °C (°F)	21.2 (70.2)	23.0 (73.4)	26.8 (80.2)	34.4 (93.9)	36.6 (97.9)	42.0 (107.6)	44.0 (111.2)	44.3 (111.7)	42.6 (108.7)	37.0 (98.6)	27.2 (81.0)	21.0 (69.8)	44.3 (111.7)
Mean daily maximum °C (°F)	12.0 (53.6)	14.0 (57.2)	17.7 (63.9)	19.3 (66.7)	23.7 (74.7)	29.9 (85.8)	33.7 (92.7)	33.2 (91.8)	28.8 (83.8)	22.0 (71.6)	15.9 (60.6)	12.5 (54.5)	21.9 (71.4)
Daily mean °C (°F)	7.8 (46.0)	9.3 (48.7)	12.2 (54.0)	13.8 (56.8)	17.6 (63.7)	22.9 (73.2)	26.2 (79.2)	26.0 (78.8)	22.4 (72.3)	17.0 (62.6)	11.7 (53.1)	8.7 (47.7)	16.3 (61.3)
Mean daily minimum °C (°F)	3.7 (38.7)	4.7 (40.5)	6.7 (44.1)	8.3 (46.9)	11.5 (52.7)	16.0 (60.8)	18.8 (65.8)	18.7 (65.7)	16.0 (60.8)	11.9 (53.4)	7.5 (45.5)	4.9 (40.8)	10.7 (51.3)
Record low °C (°F)	−5.6 (21.9)	−5.6 (21.9)	−3.6 (25.5)	−1.4 (29.5)	2.8 (37.0)	5.4 (41.7)	10.0 (50.0)	11.0 (51.8)	7.4 (45.3)	2.4 (36.3)	−2.2 (28.0)	−4.6 (23.7)	−5.6 (21.9)
Average precipitation mm (inches)	54 (2.1)	48 (1.9)	36 (1.4)	52 (2.0)	50 (2.0)	20 (0.8)	6 (0.2)	7 (0.3)	30 (1.2)	77 (3.0)	89 (3.5)	77 (3.0)	551 (21.7)
Average precipitation days (≥ 1 mm)	6.7	6.5	5	7.2	6.5	2.6	0.7	1	3.5	7.5	8.1	8.4	63.7
Average snowy days	0.3	0.1	0.1	0	0	0	0	0	0	0	0	0.1	0.6
Average relative humidity (%)	79	73	63	60	55	44	37	39	49	65	76	80	60
Mean monthly sunshine hours	156	175	232	247	297	336	379	348	261	205	158	129	2,922
Source 1: Agencia Estatal de Meteorología
Source 2: Agencia Estatal de Meteorología

== Demographics ==
Historical population
Year	Pop.	±%
1842	12,052	—
1857	14,795	+22.8%
1877	11,847	−19.9%
1887	13,749	+16.1%
1900	13,617	−1.0%
1910	14,562	+6.9%
1920	20,218	+38.8%
1930	24,352	+20.4%
1940	29,030	+19.2%
1950	40,009	+37.8%
1960	45,960	+14.9%
1970	55,341	+20.4%
1981	65,758	+18.8%
1991	74,589	+13.4%
2001	82,716	+10.9%
2011	95,616	+15.6%
2021	95,659	+0.0%
Source: INE

As of 2025, the population is 96,598, of which 47.8% are male, and 52.2% are female. Minors make up 16.2% of the population, and seniors make up 20.3%.

=== Immigration ===
As of 2025, immigrants make up 6.7% of the population. The 5 largest foreign countries of birth are Colombia, Honduras, Venezuela, Morocco, and Peru.

== Neighbourhoods ==
- Center: 26,914 inhabitants.
- West (new): 15,726 inhabitants.
- South: 14,738 inhabitants.
- Mejostilla: 11,484 people.
- Aldea Moret: 6,756 inhabitants
- Old Town, 5,799 inhabitants.
- West: 4,591 inhabitants.
- North: 4,656 inhabitants.
- East: 2,646 inhabitants.
- Pedanías (Rincón de Ballesteros, Valdesalor, and Arroyo-Malpartida Station): 749 inhabitants.
- Rest: 295 inhabitants.

== Main sights ==
The walls contain a medieval town setting with no outward signs of modernity, which is why many television shows and films have been shot there, including scenes for Game of Thrones and the Spanish series Isabel.

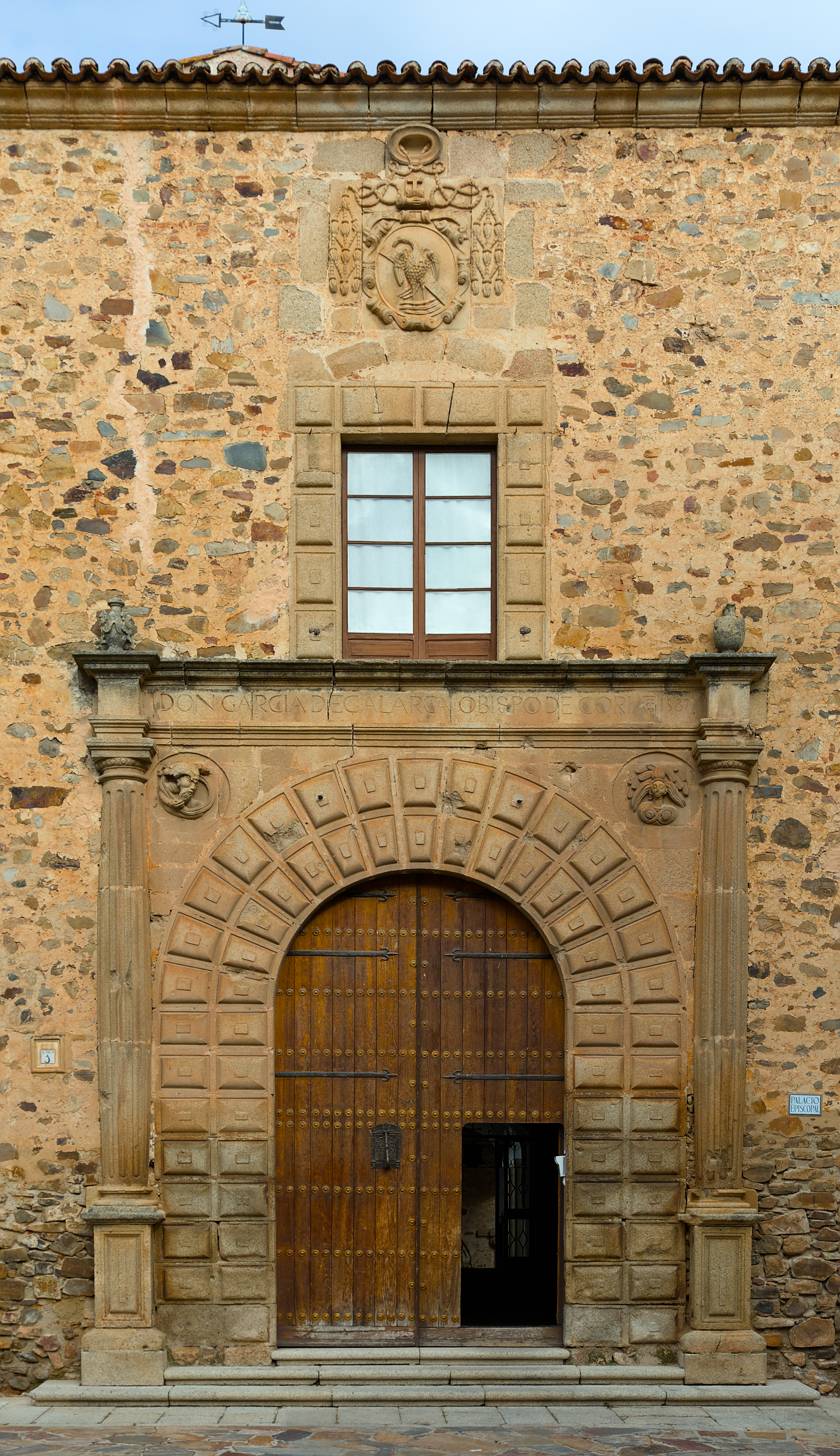
Archbishop's Palace.

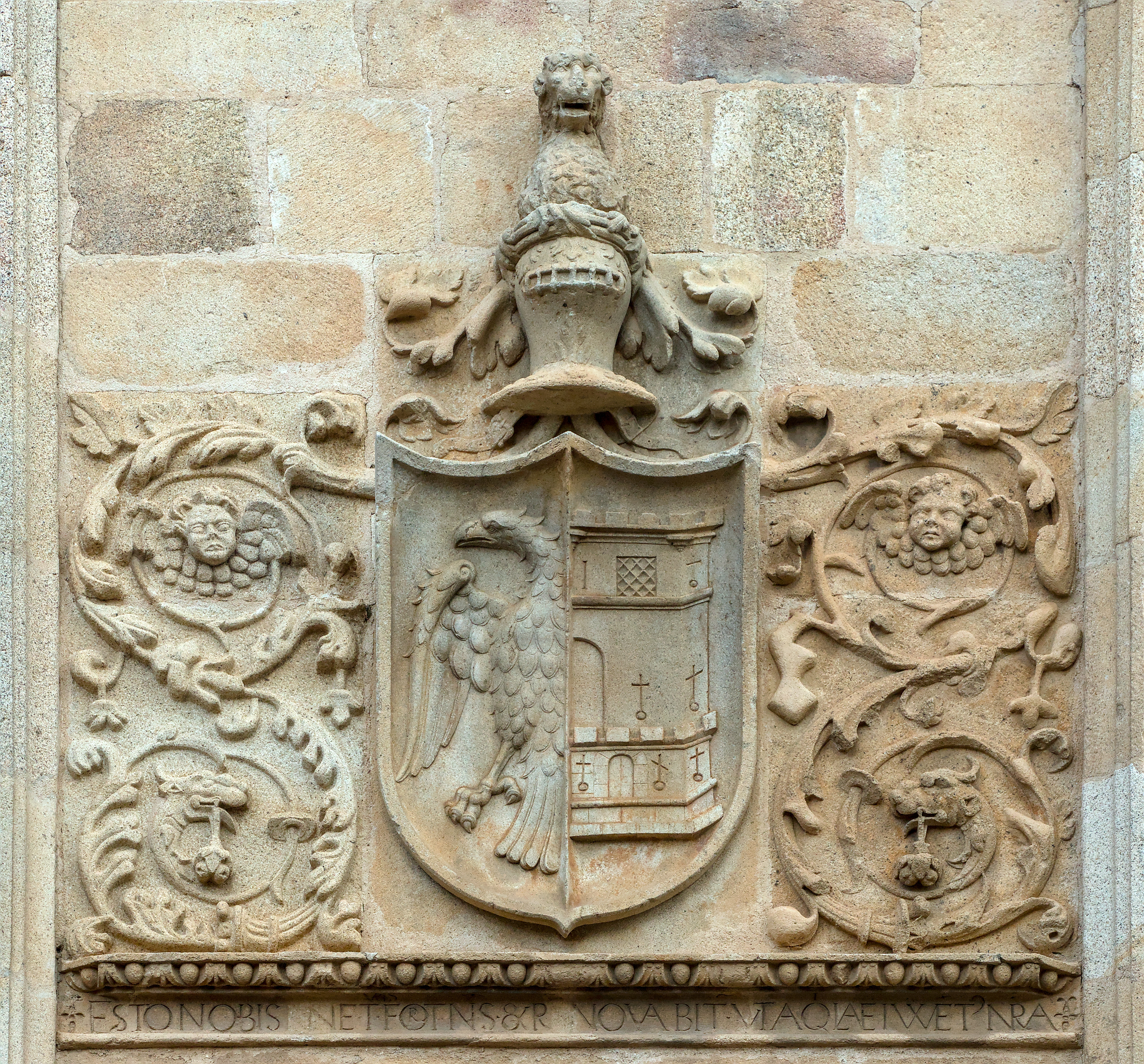
Coat of arms on the façade of Mayoralgo Palace.

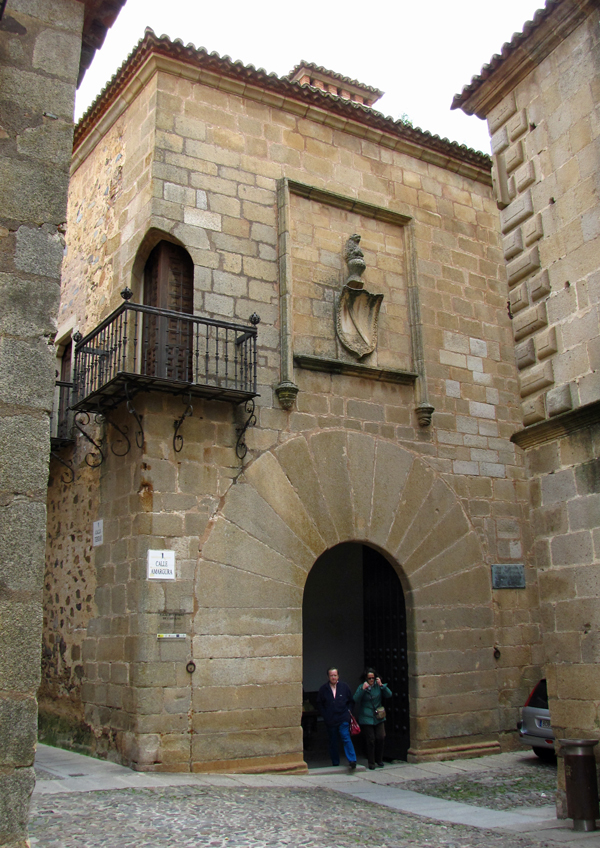
Carvajal Palace

The "Monumental City of Cáceres" was declared by the Council of Europe as the Third Monumental Complex of Europe in 1968 (after Prague and Tallinn) and World Heritage by Unesco in 1986. Cáceres also has other awards: Pomme d'Or to "Tourism Merit", awarded by the International Federation of Tourism Journalists and Writers in 1996; Les Etoiles d'Or du Jumelage, awarded by the European Commission in 1999; The Archival prize awarded by the Association for the Recovery of Historical Centers in 2004 and the Citizens 2008 Award granted by the Association of Radio and Digital Television Entities, with the collaboration of the Citizen Audiovisual Council for the support that the citizenship provided to The candidacy for the European Capital of Culture of 2016. Cáceres is also a member of the Roads Networks of Sefarad, of the Vía de la Plata, being chosen by the Autonomous Community as Cultural Capital of Extremadura Enclave 92, and together with the solidarity effort of The administrations, private companies, official entities and private citizens, aspired between 2003 and 2010 to be European Capital of Culture in the year 2016.

=== Cathedrals, churches, convents and monasteries ===
- Convento de San Pablo (15th century)
- Convento de Santa Clara
- Convento Jerónimas
- Convent de la Compañía de Jesus, in Baroque style, today used for art exhibitions
- Iglesia de Santa María, cathedral built in the 13th century, in Gothic style
- Iglesia de San Mateo, a 15th-century church built on the site of a former mosque
- Iglesia de San Francisco Javier (18th century), in Baroque style
- Iglesia de San Juan, large majestic church built between the 13th and 15th century
- Iglesia de Santo Domingo
- Monasterio de Santa María de Jesús
- Parroquia de San Blas
- Parroquia de Nuestra Señora del Rosario de Fátima
- Parroquia Sagrada Familia
- Parroquia de San José (Cáceres)
- Parroquia San Juan Macías
- Ermita (Hermitage) de las Candelas
- Ermita (Hermitage) del Calvario
- Ermita (Hermitage) de la Paz
- Ermita de San Antonio
- Ermita del Vaquero
- Ermita del Cristo del Amparo
- Ermita de San Marcos el Nuevo (San Marquino)
- Ermita de San Ildefonso
- Santuario de Nuestra Señora la Virgen de la Montaña

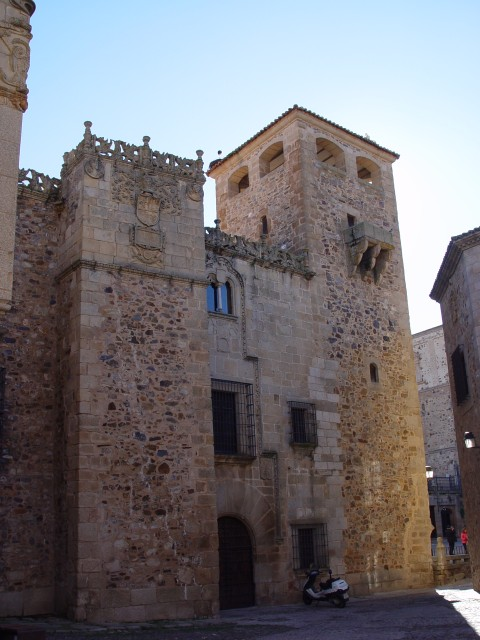
Queen Isabella I of Castile and King Fernando I soujourned in the Lower Golfines Palace.

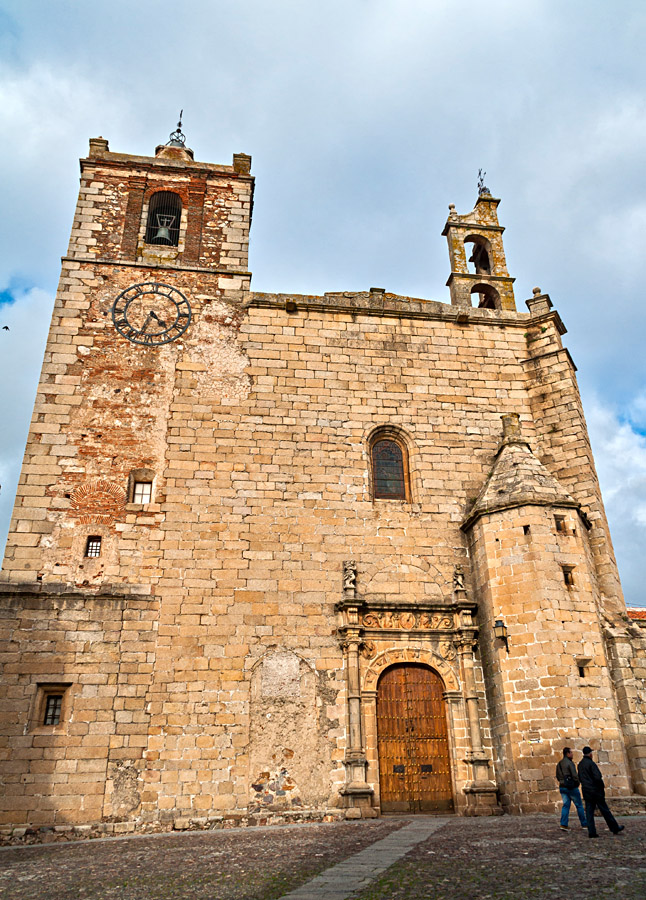
San Mateo Church

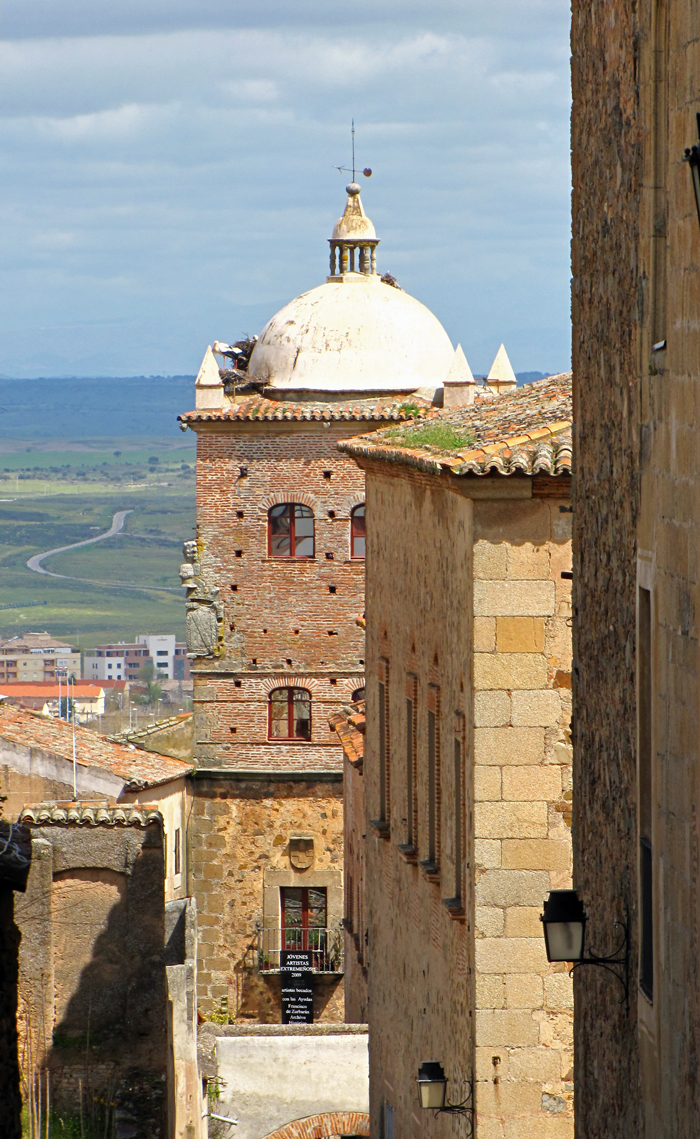
Toledo-Moctezuma Palace

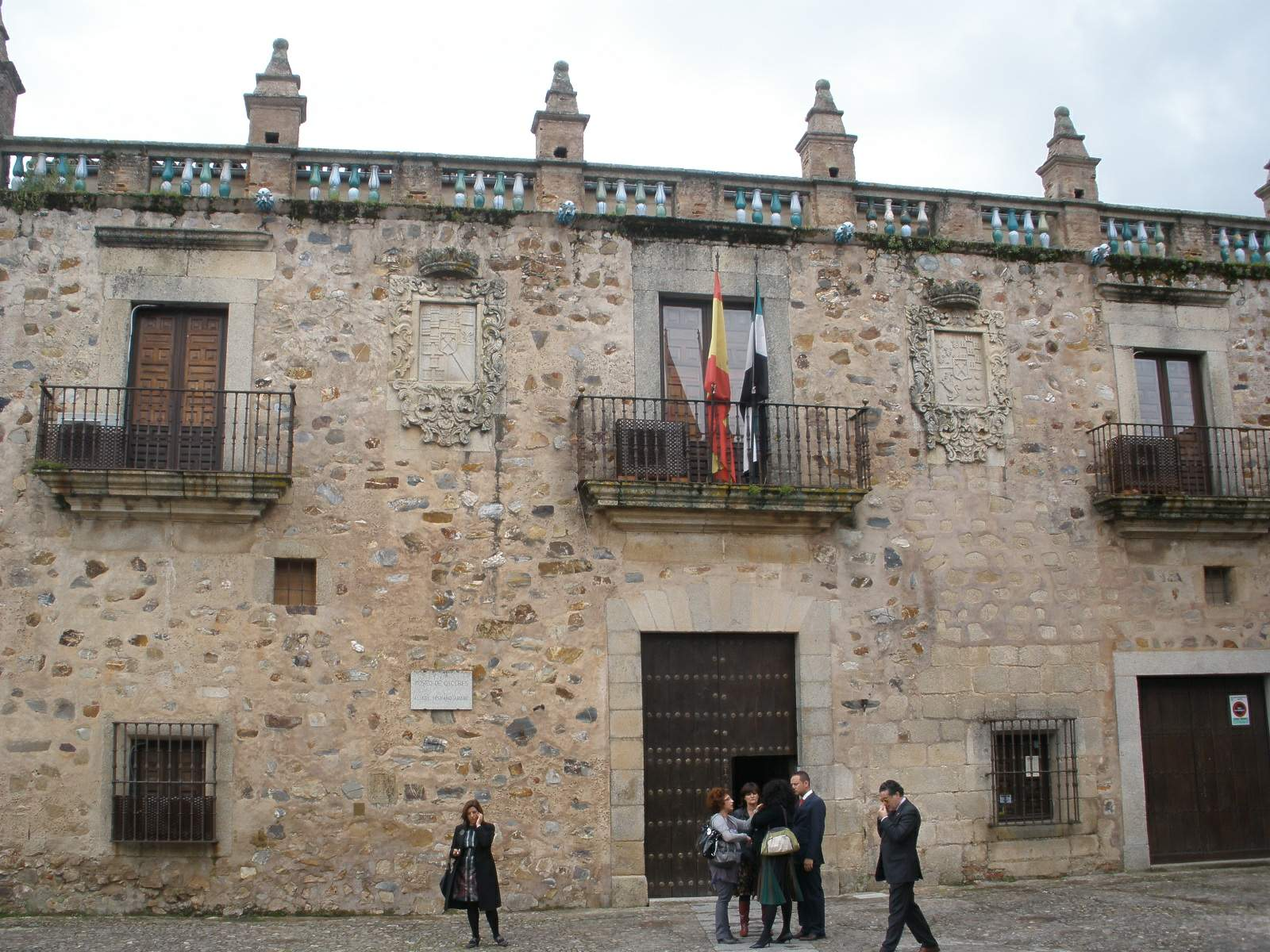
The Veletas Palace

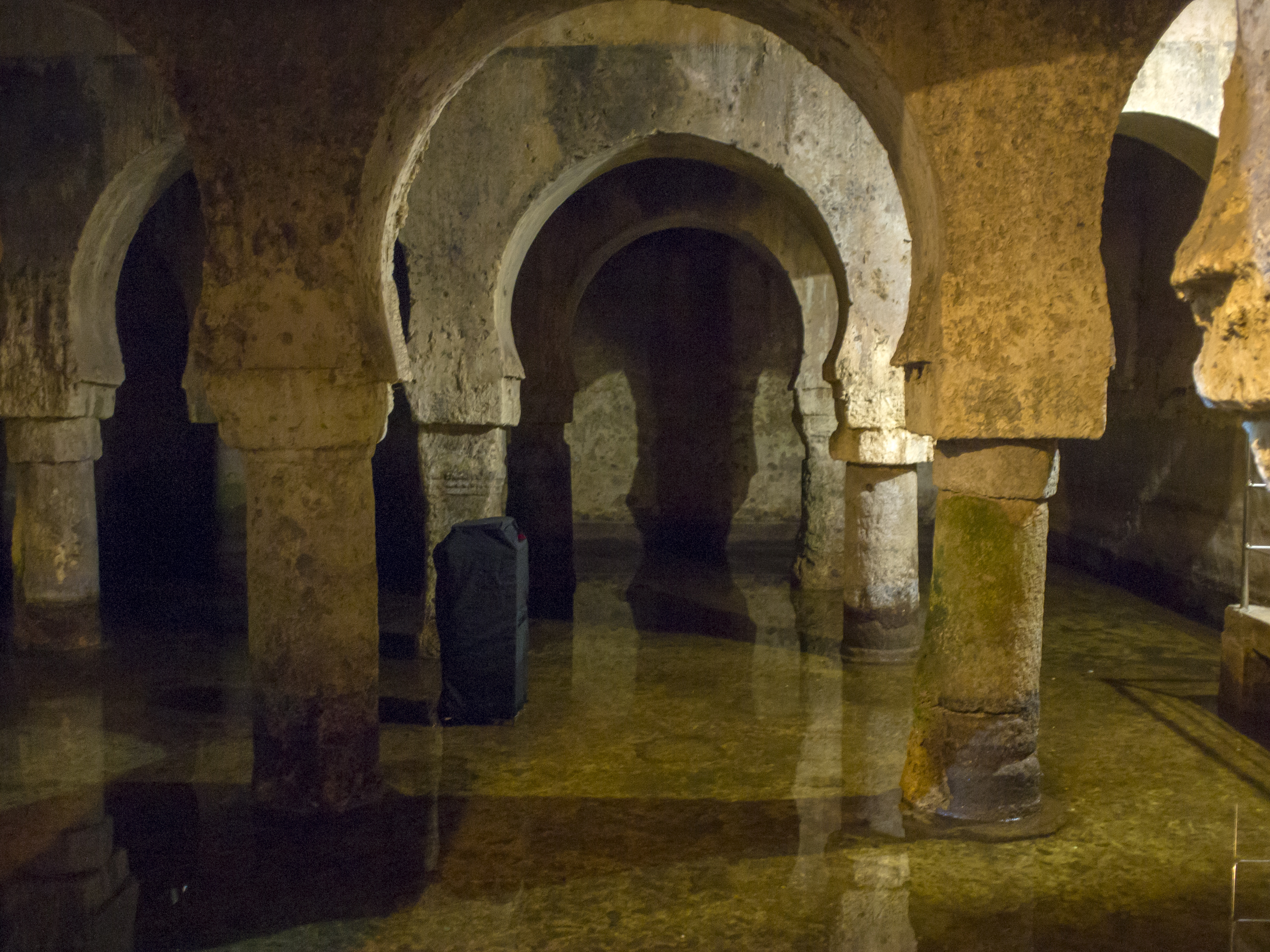
Aljibe, a cistern, built by the Arabs, to store potable water in the Veletas Palace.

=== Palaces and Stately Houses ===
The following palaces and noble houses are located in the historic center:

- Palacio Episcopal Palace (Palacio Episcopal)
- Lower Golfines Palace (Palacio de los Golfines de Abajo) - Queen Isabella I of Castile and King Fernando II soujourned here.
- Carvajal Palace (Palacio Carvajal) (15th Century) - Now seat of the Patronage Office for Tourism and Handicraft of the province.
- Palace of the Storks (Palacio de las Ciguenas)
- Veletas Palace (Palacio de las Veletas) is part of the Cáceres Museum complex.
- House of the Sun (Casa del Sol)
- Upper Golfines Palace (Placio de los Golfines de Arriba)
- Toledo-Moctezuma Palace (Palacio de Toledo-Moctezuma) - The palace dates to the 15th Century with changes in the 16th Century, after the marriage of Mariana de Carvajal y Toledo with Juan de Toledo Moctezuma, who was a descendant of Juan Cano de Saavedra and Isabel de Moctezuma, daughter of the Aztec emperor Moctezuma II Xocoyotzin.
- Palace of the Commander of Alcuéscar (Palacio del Comendador de Alcuéscar)
- Isla Palace (Palacio de la Isla)
- Francisco de Godoy Palace(Palacio de Francisco de Godoy)
- Generala Palace (Palacio de la Generala)
- House of Ovando (Casa de los Ovando)
- House of Becerra (Casa de los Becerra)
- House of Cáceres Ovando (Casa de los Cáceres Ovando)
- House of Sánchez Paredes (Casa de los Sánchez Paredes)
- House of Paredes Saavedra (Casa de los Paredes Saavedra)
- House of Lorenzo de Ulloa (Casa de Lorenzo de Ulloa)
- House of Saavedra (Casa de los Saavedra)
- House of Aldana (Casa de Aldana)
- House of Ovando Perero (Casa de los Ovando Perero)
- House of the Monkey (Casa del Mono)
- House of Moragas (Casa de Moragas)
- House of Ribera (Casa de los Ribera)
- House of Caballos (Casa de los Caballos)
- House of Pereros (Casa de los Pereros)
- Palace-Fortress of Torreorgaz (Palacio-Fortaleza de los Torreorgaz) - today a Parador hotel.

=== Wall ===
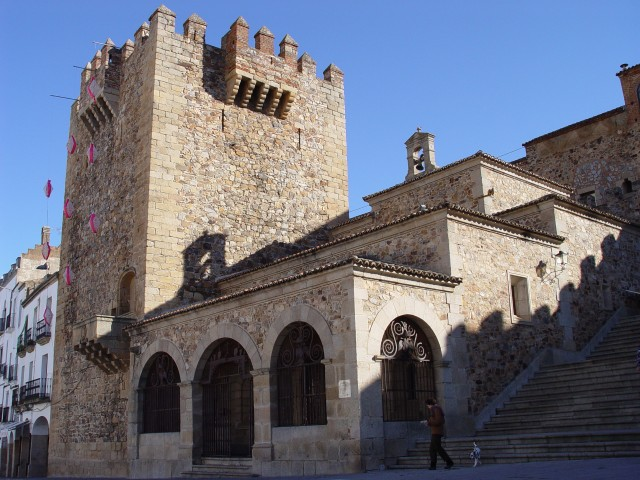
Torre de Bujaco with the La Paz Hermitage.

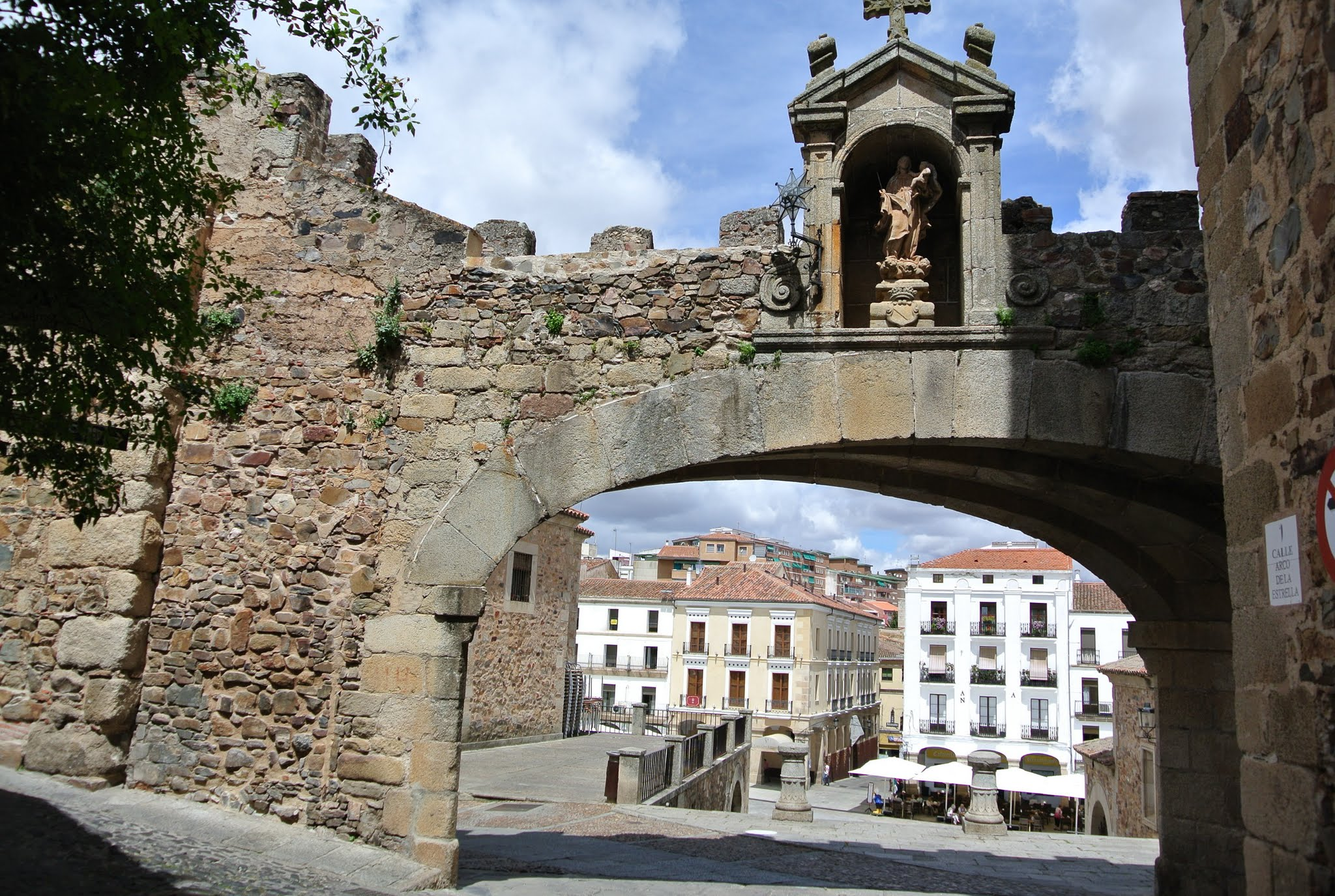
The Arco de Estrella (Star Arch) is the main entrance gate, dating to the 15th Century, to the walled medieval city of Cáceres.

- Torre de Bujaco (12th Century)
- Arco de la Estrella (18th Century)
- Torre de Sande (14th-15th Centuries)

=== Museums ===
- Cáceres Museum - Aljibe - housed in La Casa de las Veletas y la Casa de los Caballos in the Historical Quarter.
- La Casa-Museo Árabe, between the Plaza San Jorge and the Arco del Cristo. Arab culture, art and remains.
- Museo Concatedral de Cáceres, in the Plaza Santa Maria. Religious art.
- Museo Piedrilla - Guayasamín

=== Castles ===
Several castles are located in the municipality of Cáceres:

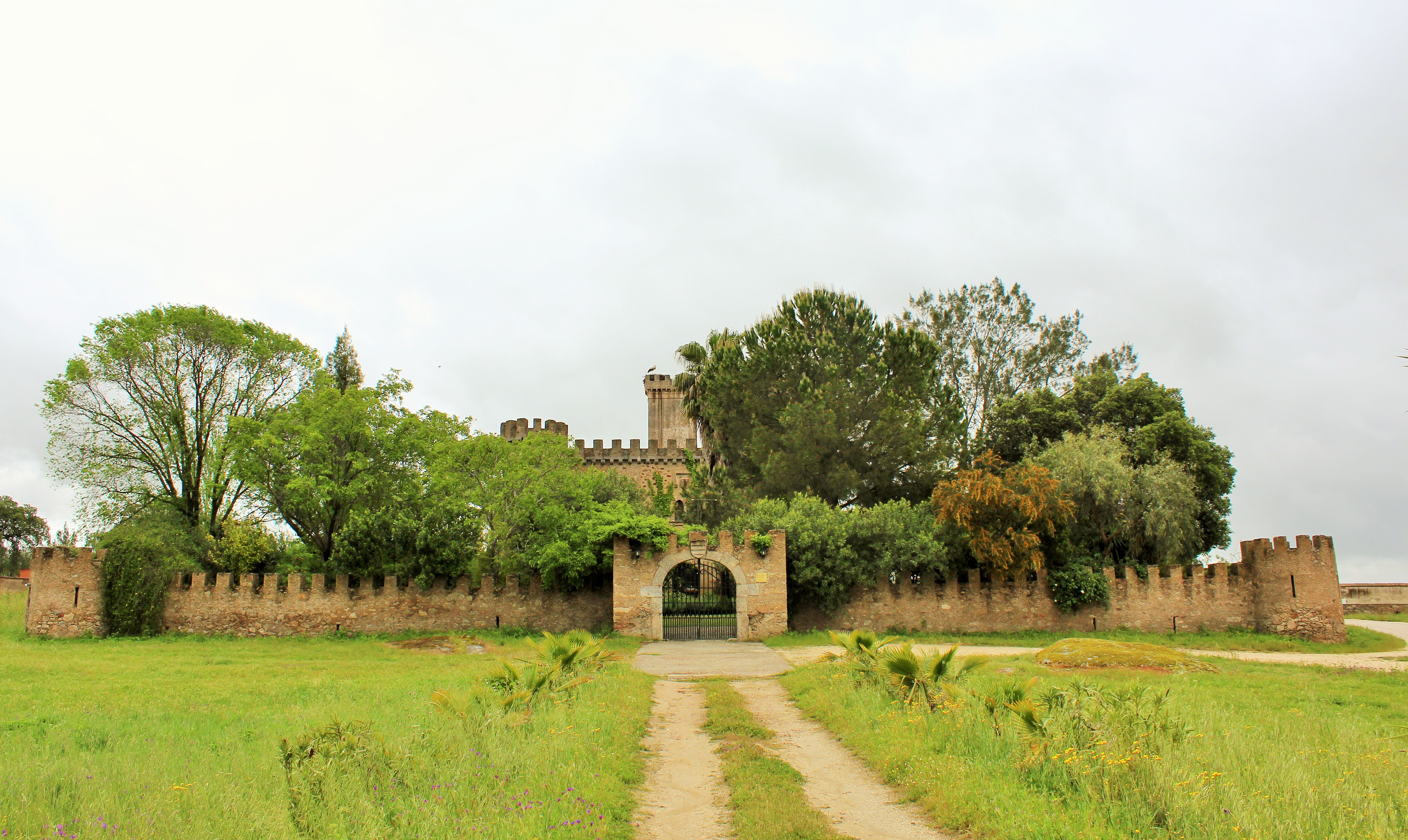
Castle palace of las Seguras

- Arguijuelas de Abajo Castle, located south of the city on N-630, was built in the 15th and 16th Centuries and is privately owned. It is used for hospitality activities;
- Arguijuelas de Arriba Castle, located next to Arguijuelas de Abajo on the same road, from the 15th century, also privately owned;
- Salor Castle, on N-630 next to Valdesalor;
- Fortress of Santiago de Bencáliz or Santiago de Vencáliz, on N-630 next to the town of Casas de Don Antonio, dates from the 15th Century and is privately owned. The property on which it is located is used as the headquarters of the Casas de Don Antonio pilgrimage;
- Carretona Fortress, on the Carretona estate in EX-100, was built in 1469 and is currently used as a farm.
- Las Seguras Castle Palace, in EX-100 near the Salor River, is a privately owned 14th Century palace.
- Mogollones Castle, in front of the Las Seguras castle, was built in the 14th Century and was destroyed in the 17th Century. It is currently a ruin.
- Mayoralguillo Tower, next to the Las Seguras castle, was built in the 13th Century.
- Castillo de Castellanos, near the provincial border with Cordobilla de Lácara, was built around 1477 as part of the manor of Fernán Gutiérrez de Valverde, and is currently in a state of progressive ruin. Although it is private property, it is not used in any way and access is free.

=== Nature reserves ===
- Monfragüe National Park: It encompasses 85 km^{2} (33 sq mi) or 17,852 hectares. The park contains one of the largest areas of Mediterranean forest and scrub in Spain, with over 1,400 different species of trees. A favorite with birdwatchers, the park has the world's largest colony of Black Vulture and Spanish Imperial Eagle.
- Los Barruecos Natural Monument: 14 kilometres (9 miles) away from the city, in the locality of Malpartida de Cáceres. It has massive granite boulders with the only colony of White Stork nesting on them. There is also a medieval reservoir and a mill for wool washing. The building complex has been restored and houses a surprising collection of art by German artist Wolf Vostell, who was an important member of the Fluxus movement. Spring brings an explosion of color with the blossom of Spanish White Broom pervasive in the area.
- The Cáceres and Trujillo Plains are protected under the ZEPA (Spanish for Special Protection Area for birds or SPA) protection figure.

== Tourism ==
The city has more than 3,500 hotel beds; with 660,668 visitors registered by the municipal tourist centers during 2009, it became the first tourist center in the region in number of visitors. In 1996 Cáceres received the Pomme d'Or tourism award.

== Culture ==
=== Festivals ===
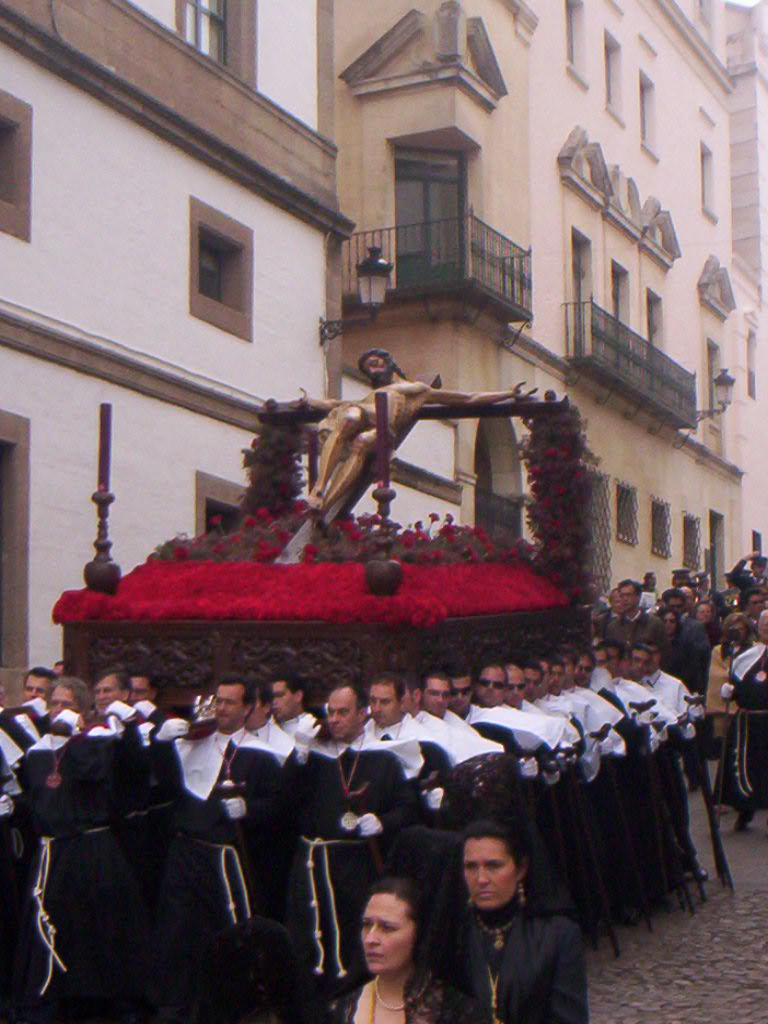
Christ of Calvary paraded through the Gran Vía of Cáceres.

- The Festival of the Martyrs (La Fiesta de los mártires) is held the Sunday closest to 20 January in the hermitage of the Martyrs.
- Carnival, The Festival of the Candles (La Fiesta de las Candelas) and Fiesta de San Blas are held are held from 1 to 3 February.
- The Easter Festival (Semana Santa) is held during the week before Easter Sunday. Processions wind through the narrow streets in the historical center.
- The San Jorge Festival, held on 22–23 April, involves a dragon being burnt in a bonfire in the town square (La Plaza Mayor), accompanied by a fireworks display.
- May Fair, founded by Alfonso IX of León, is celebrated between 28 and 30 May.

==== Music festivals ====
Cáceres hosts several music festivals at different times of the year. The most crowded are the WOMAD, a world music festival held in the month of May, and the SonoraCC, dedicated to pop, rock and indie national.

- World of Music, Arts and Dance (WOMAD): Music festival held at the beginning of May. WOMAD is organized by the global organization WOMAD and created by Peter Gabriel in 1982. The WOMAD festival held in Cáceres is the first of two, in Cáceres and Canary Islands, held annually in Spain. The Caceres WOMAD is unique among the nine held around the world for taking place in the interior of a monumental city;

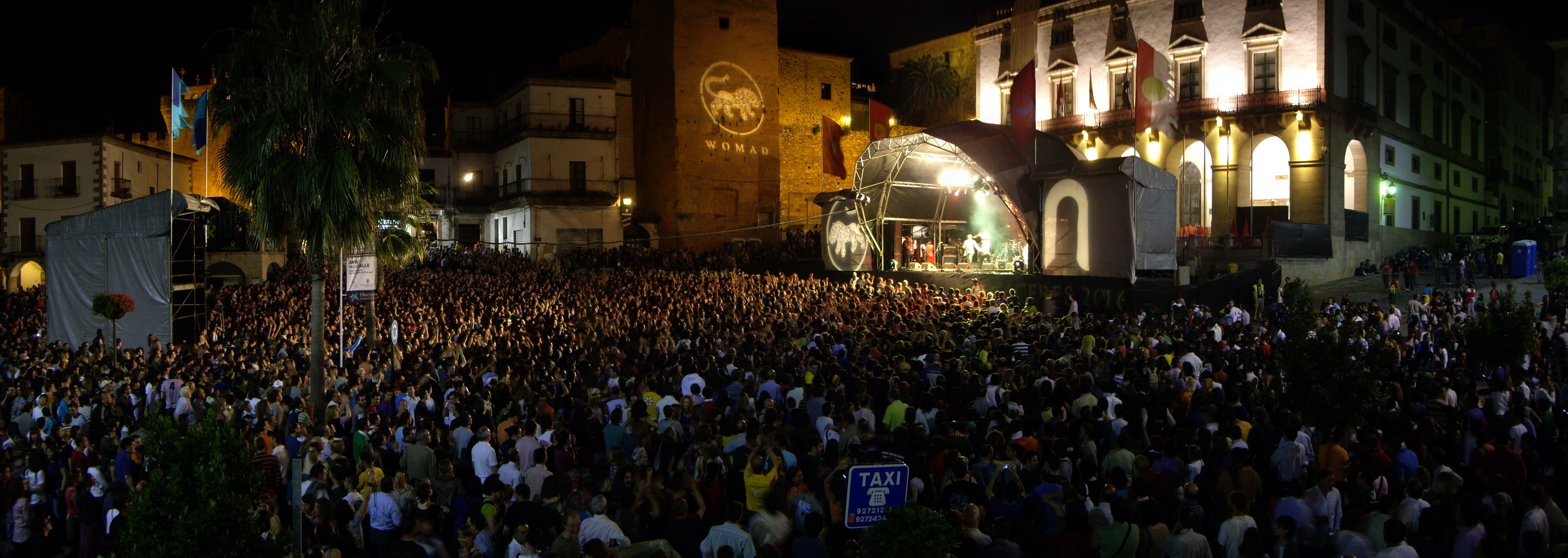
The Plaza Mayor of Cáceres during the celebration of WOMAD 2009

- Cáceres Pop-Art: September festival that brings together different artistic manifestations referring to pop culture, such as music, art, photography, cinema, literature, comics or fashion. Exhibitions are organized, film series take place in the city at the Filmoteca de Extremadura and a series of free concerts, giving priority to emerging groups and artists who stand out in national and international independent music. It culminates with the presentation of the Pop Eye awards to musicians and creators linked to noncommercial circuits;
- Aldea de la Amex: September festival organized by the Association of Musicians of Extremadura and held in the neighborhood of Aldea Moret, dedicated to the integration of gypsy culture through music and art;
- Cáceres Irish Fleadh: Cultural event occurring between October and November; a festival of traditional Irish and Celtic music in general, with performances in pubs and theaters in the city. The idea comes from Fleadh Cheoil, an Irish music event that happens every August in Ireland.
- Festival del Oeste: In the first week of July, with national and international hard rock, heavy metal and punk-rock groups;
- Ciudad de Cáceres International Black Music Festival: July festival that unites different styles such as soul, funk, blues, disco and others;
- Ibero-American Early Music Festival: In September, with concerts and ancient music courses held in different locations and temples in the monumental city;
- International Folk Festival of the Peoples of the World: In July, with performances, parades and workshops;
- Musical autumn.

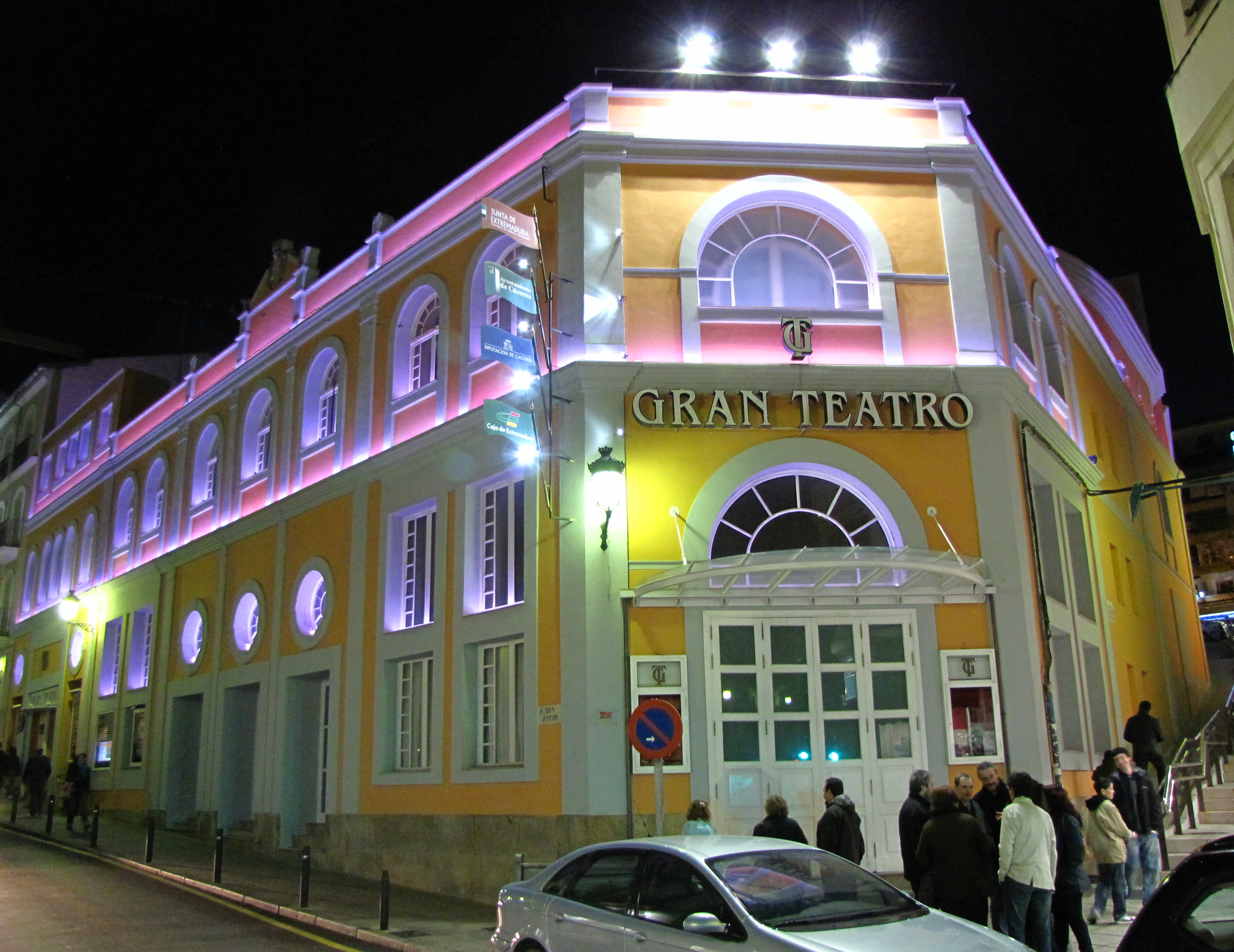
Night view of the Gran Teatro

==== Film and theater festivals ====
- The Cáceres Classical Theater Festival: The most important theater festival in the city is held in June, opening the season of classical theater festivals in Spain.

Several film festivals are held in Cáceres throughout the year, concentrated in the months of March and November.

- Solidarity Festival of Spanish Cinema of Cáceres and the Envideo Cáceres Festival: Held in March.
- Extremadura Gay and Lesbian Film Festival (Cáceres is one of its venues along with Mérida and Badajoz) and the EXTREMA´doc International Documentary Film Festival and Development Cooperation:. Held in November.
- Summer Film Series: Held in August at the Foro de los Balbos, organized by the Filmoteca de Extremadura. The sessions are held on weekends, with between four and six films screened each year. Attendance is free until capacity is reached.
- Fanter Film Festival

==== Painting exhibitions ====
- South Forum. Contemporary Ibero-American Art Fair: Held in April at the San Jorge exhibition center, in the heart of the Monumental City of Cáceres, although it also has artistic manifestations in the rest of the city. It tries to spread knowledge of contemporary art, promote the art market, and promote collecting. Currently, it is classified as the second most important contemporary art fair in Spain after ARCO.

==== Historical reenactments ====
- Medieval Market: Held in November, this market is located inside the walls, considered the second most important in Spain, where you can buy curious, classic or artisanal objects, typical products and local foods, with a historical setting in the entire Monumental City. It celebrates the cultures that coexisted in Cáceres.

=== Cuisine ===
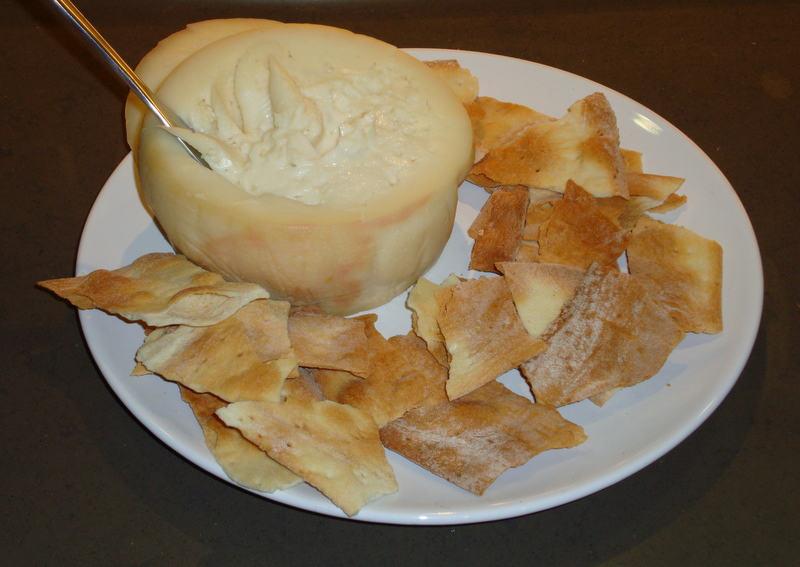
Torta del Casar cheese

The small streets in the historical centre have many shops selling typical products. The convents sell homemade sweets and pastries. Typical wines from Extremadura are affordable, full-bodied reds. Local liqueurs include cherry liqueur from the nearby Jerte valley, or other original liqueurs such as chestnut and blackberry. Other produce in the province include sheep's cheese (Torta del Casar, is not made of goat's milk, but with milk from merino sheep), fig cake, chestnuts, hams and other pork products, lamb, olive oil, and paprika (pimentón de la Vera).

Salt-cured ham and red wine are produced locally and are officially recognized by the Spanish government. Both goat's and sheep's cheese are produced by traditional methods and renowned throughout the country. Cáceres is also famous for its stews, roast meats (especially pork, lamb, and game), fried breadcrumbs (migas), trout, pastries, and honey.

== Education ==
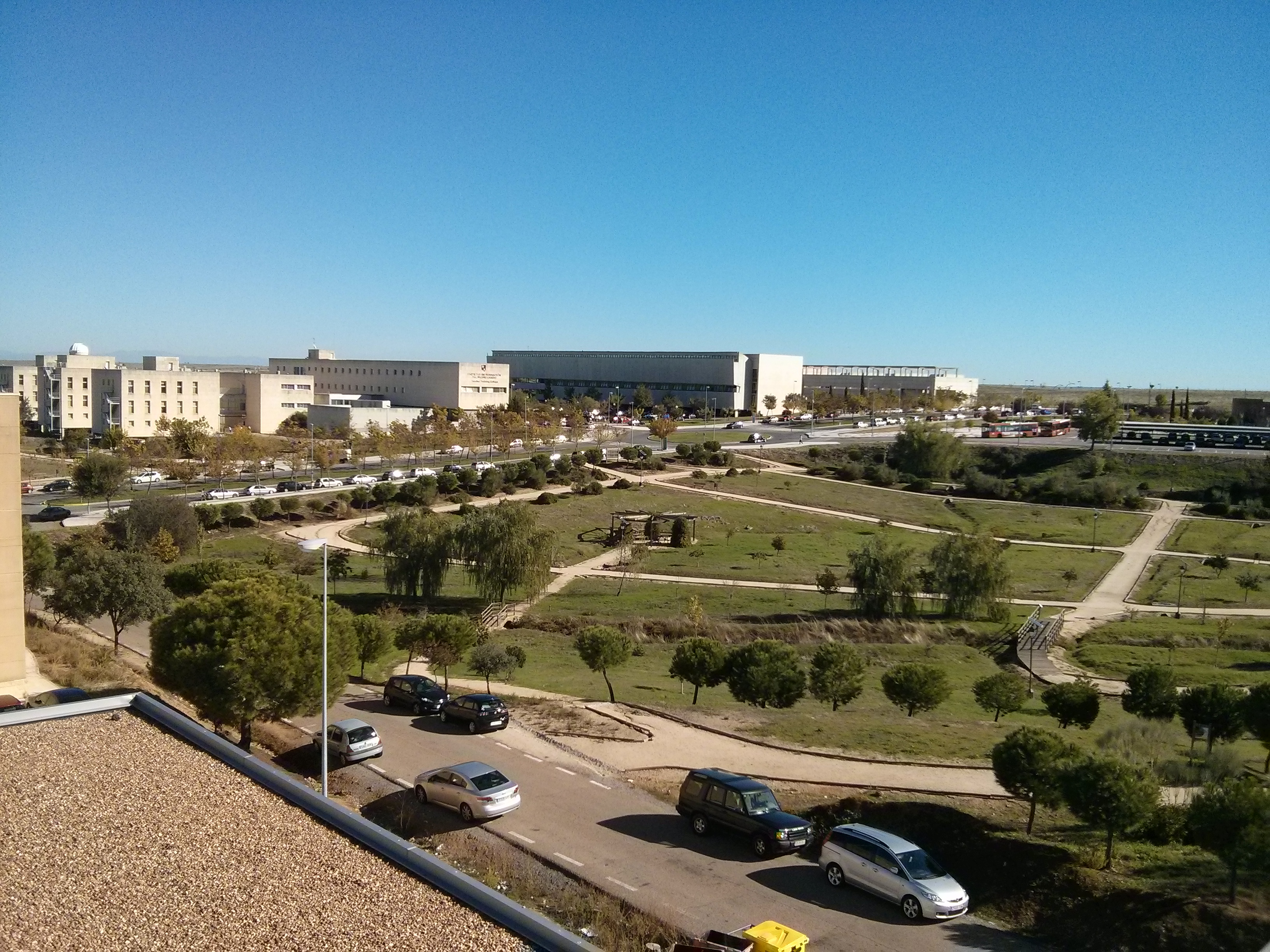
Cáceres Campus of the University of Extremadura

The University of Extremadura (founded in 1973) has a campus in Cáceres.

== Transport ==
The city of Cáceres railway station serves around 100,000 passengers annually. Across the street is the bus terminal, with multiple buses daily to other cities.

Cáceres is situated close to the Autovía A-66 from Seville to Gijón.

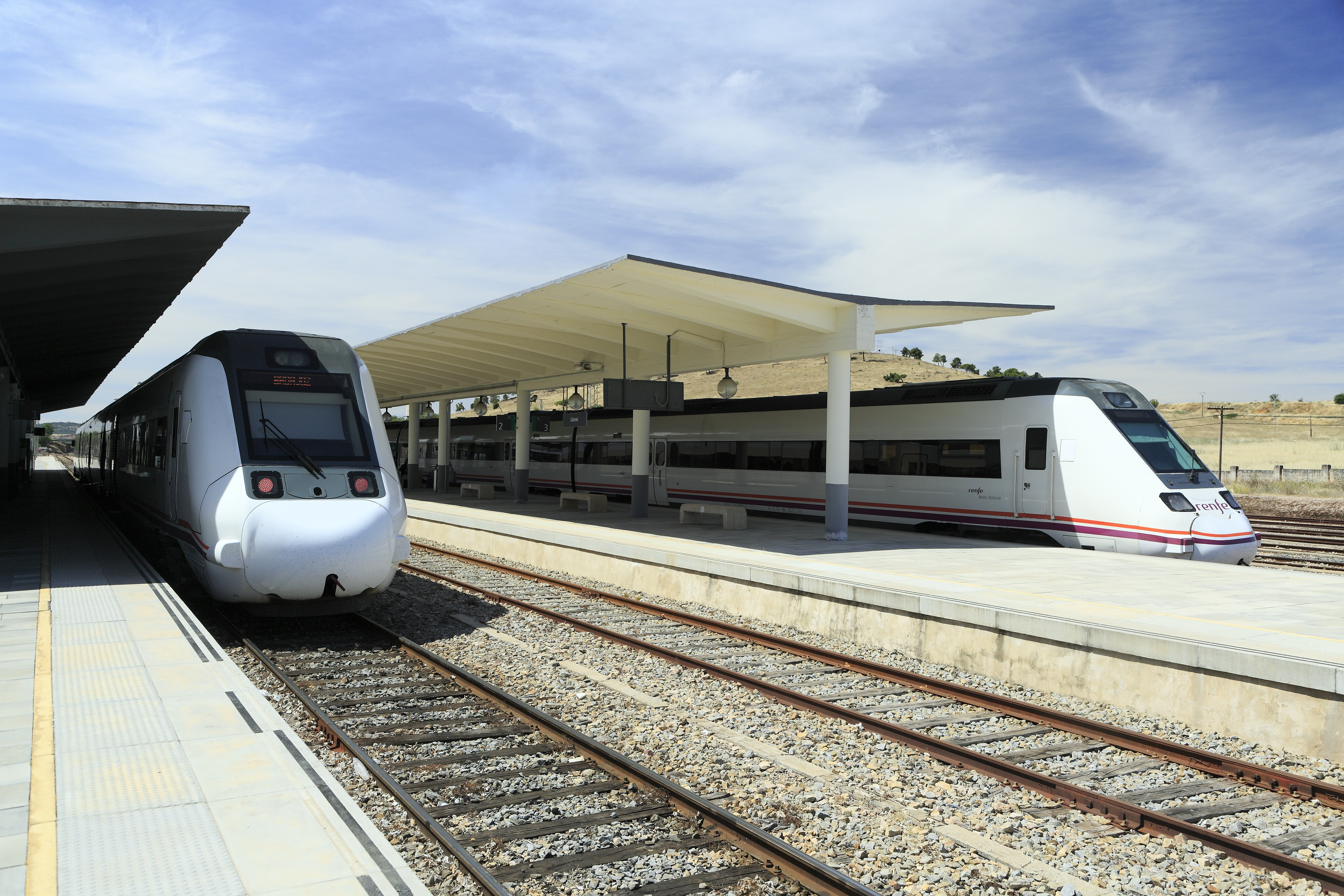
Cáceres Train Station

The city does not have its own airport. The nearest airport is Badajoz Airport, located 115 km (71 mi) south west of Cáceres.

== Sports ==
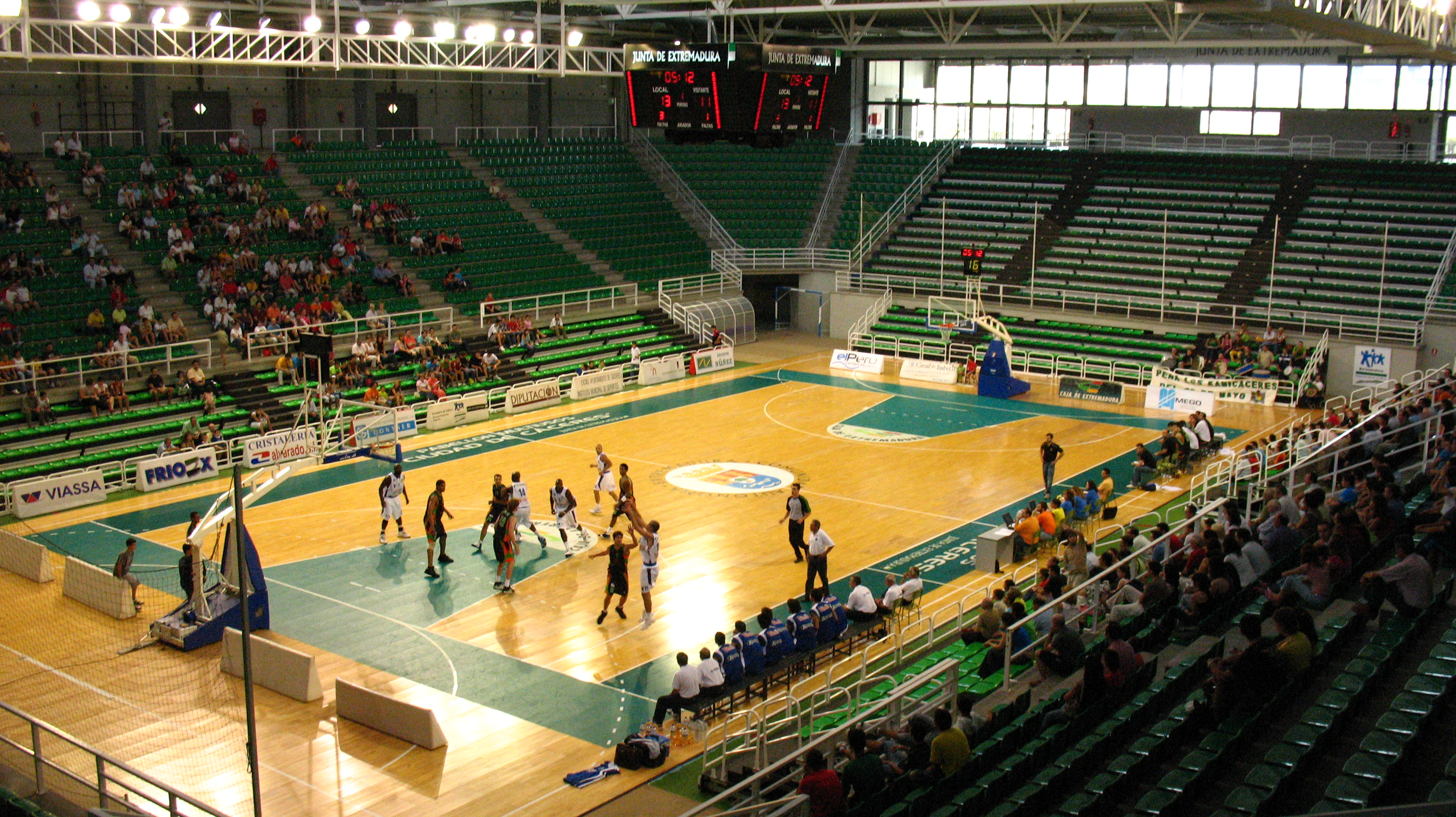
Basketball fixture played at the Multiusos Ciudad de Cáceres.

Among others notable sport teams, Cáceres is home to association football team CP Cacereño who currently play in the Tercera División; the professional basketball teams Cáceres Basket, who play the Liga LEB Oro and Club Baloncesto Al-Qazeres, who play the Liga Femenina; and Rugby Union Extremadura CAR Cáceres playing DHB, 2nd National división.

== International relations ==
=== Twin towns – sister cities ===
- Santiago de Compostela, Spain (since 1973)
- La Roche-sur-Yon, France (since 1982)
- Castelo Branco, Portugal
- Portalegre, Portugal (since 2006)
- Piano di Sorrento, Italy (since 2008)
- Netanya, Israel (since 2010)
- Lumbini, Nepal (since 2021)

== Notable people ==
- José de Carvajal y Lancáster (1698–1754), statesman
- Juan Donoso Cortés, marquis of Valdegamas (1809–1853), diplomat and theologian
- Belén Fernández Casero (born 1974), politician
- Carlos Floriano Corrales (born 1967), politician
- Alberto Ginés López (born 2002), professional rock climber
- María Guardiola (born 1978), politician
- Marta Lozano Molano (born 1985), composer and music scholar
- Elena Nevado (born 1967), politician
- Cayetano Polo (born 1973), politician
- María Telo (1915–2014), jurist and feminist
- Gaspar de Zúñiga y Avellaneda (1507–1571), Roman Catholic cardinal and bishop

== See also ==
- List of municipalities in Cáceres
