= María Telo =

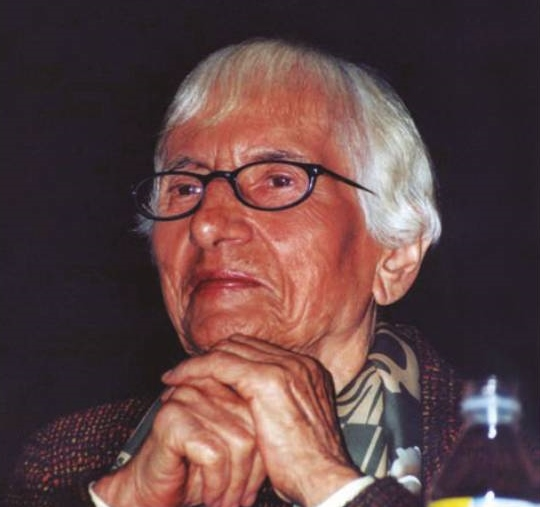
María Telo

María Telo Núñez (Cáceres, October 8, 1915 - Madrid, August 5, 2014) was a Spanish jurist and feminist, considered one of the 100 women of the 20th century for her defense of women's rights.

== Career ==
In 1944, she opposed the Technical Body of Civil Administration of the Ministry of Agriculture, being the first woman to access it. In 1976, she organized the First International Congress of Women Lawyers that took place from December 13 to 16 in Madrid. She has got and been awarded many prizes for her commitment to justice and for her struggle in favor of democracy and women's equality.
