= Marta Lozano Molano =

Spanish composer of social music (born 1985)

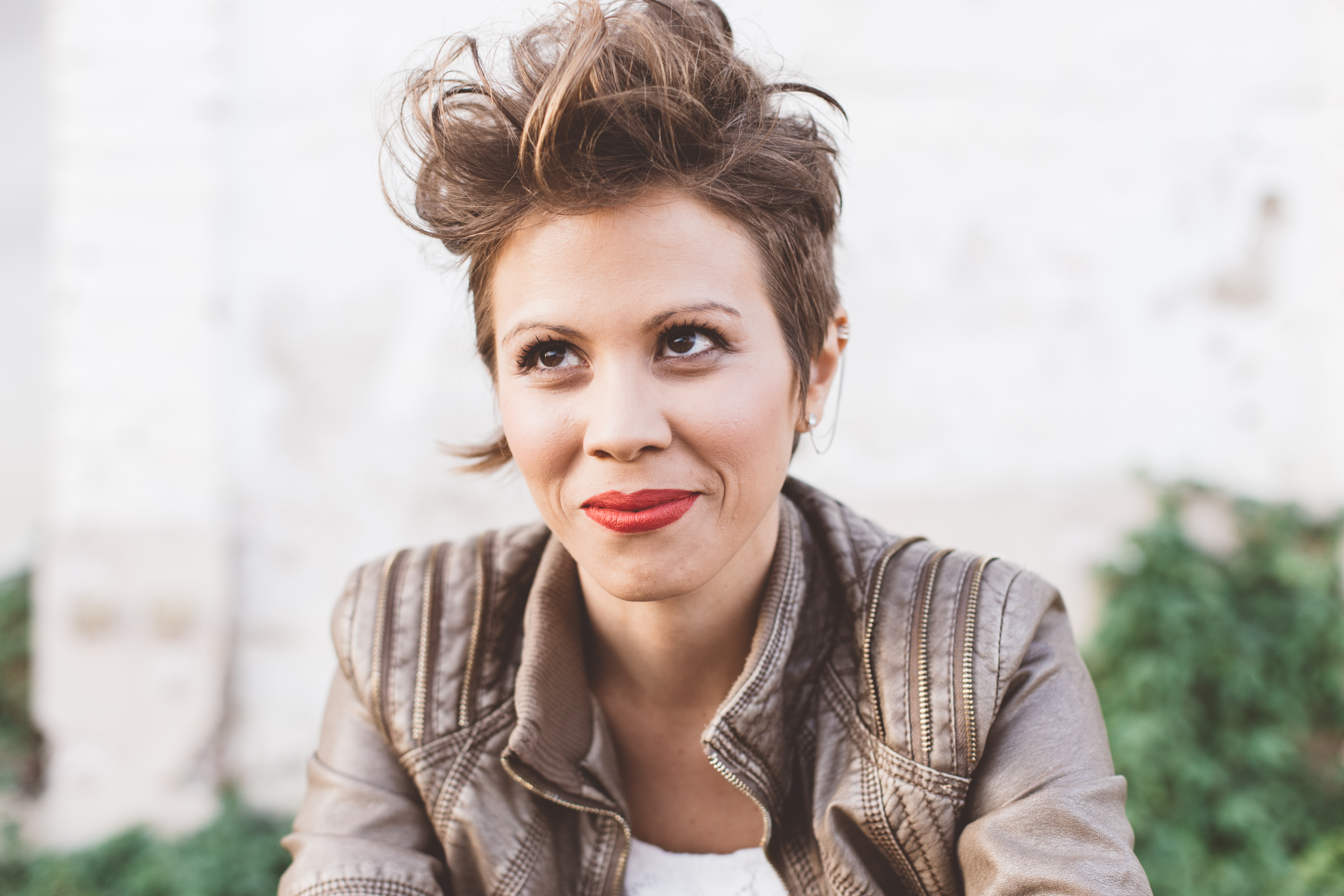
Lozano in 2021

Marta Lozano Molano (born 1985) is a Spanish composer of social music, musical education for youth which teaches values.

== Career ==
Lozano started her musical education in her hometown of Cáceres, Spain. In 2010 she graduated from Musikene, where she had studied with Gabriel Erkoreka, Stefano Scarani, and Christophe Havel. Between 2010 and 2012 she lived in London, mastering in musical composition at the Guildhall School of Music and Drama, with Paul Newlan. She has coordinated her works as composer of social music with higher studies in sound art and vocal artist. She has performed alongside London Symphony Chorus, Red and Green Choir, Coro de la Orquesta de Extremadura, University of Extremadura Choir, London Symphony Orchestra, Berliner Philharmoniker, BBC Symphony Orchestra, Royal Philharmonic Orchestra, RTVE Symphony Orchestra.
