= Casas de Don Antonio =

Coordinates: 39°14′N 6°17′W

- Flag Coat of arms

- Location in Spain.
- Country: Spain
- Autonomous community: Cáceres

Area
  - Total: 31 km^{2} (12 sq mi)
- Elevation: 405 m (1,329 ft)

Population (2025-01-01)
  - Total: 167
  - Density: 5.4/km^{2} (14/sq mi)
- Time zone: UTC+1 (CET)
  - Summer (DST): UTC+2 (CEST)
- Website: www.casasdedonantonio.es

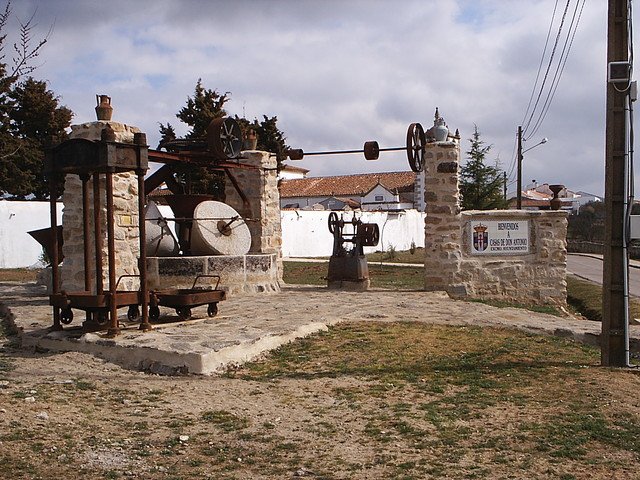
Casas de Don Antonio Entrance to the town Monument to the Mill.

Casas de Don Antonio is a municipality in the province of Cáceres and autonomous community of Extremadura, Spain. The municipality covers an area of 31 square kilometres (12 sq mi) and as of 2011 had a population of 213 people.

== See also ==
- List of municipalities in Cáceres
