= Pedro Nolasco =

Pedro Nolasco may refer to:

- Pedro Nolasco Vergara Albano (1800–1967), Chilean deputy, governor, and farmer
- Pedro Nolasco Gandarillas (1839–1891), Chilean politician
- Pedro Nolasco da Silva (1842–1912), Macanese interpreter-translator, teacher, civil servant, writer, journalist, and politician
- Pedro Nolasco de Soto (1848–1908), Spanish civil engineer and sports leader
- Pedro Nolasco Cruz Vergara (1857–1939), Chilean literary critic, novelist, writer, and politician
- Pedro Nolasco (boxer) (1962–1995), Dominican boxer
- Pedro Nolasco Street, a street in the Brazilian municipality of Coronel Fabriciano, in the state of Minas Gerais

== See also ==
- Peter Nolasco (1189–1256), Catholic nobleman
