= Zafra-Huelva railway =

Railway line of the Iberian gauge

Zafra–Huelva railway
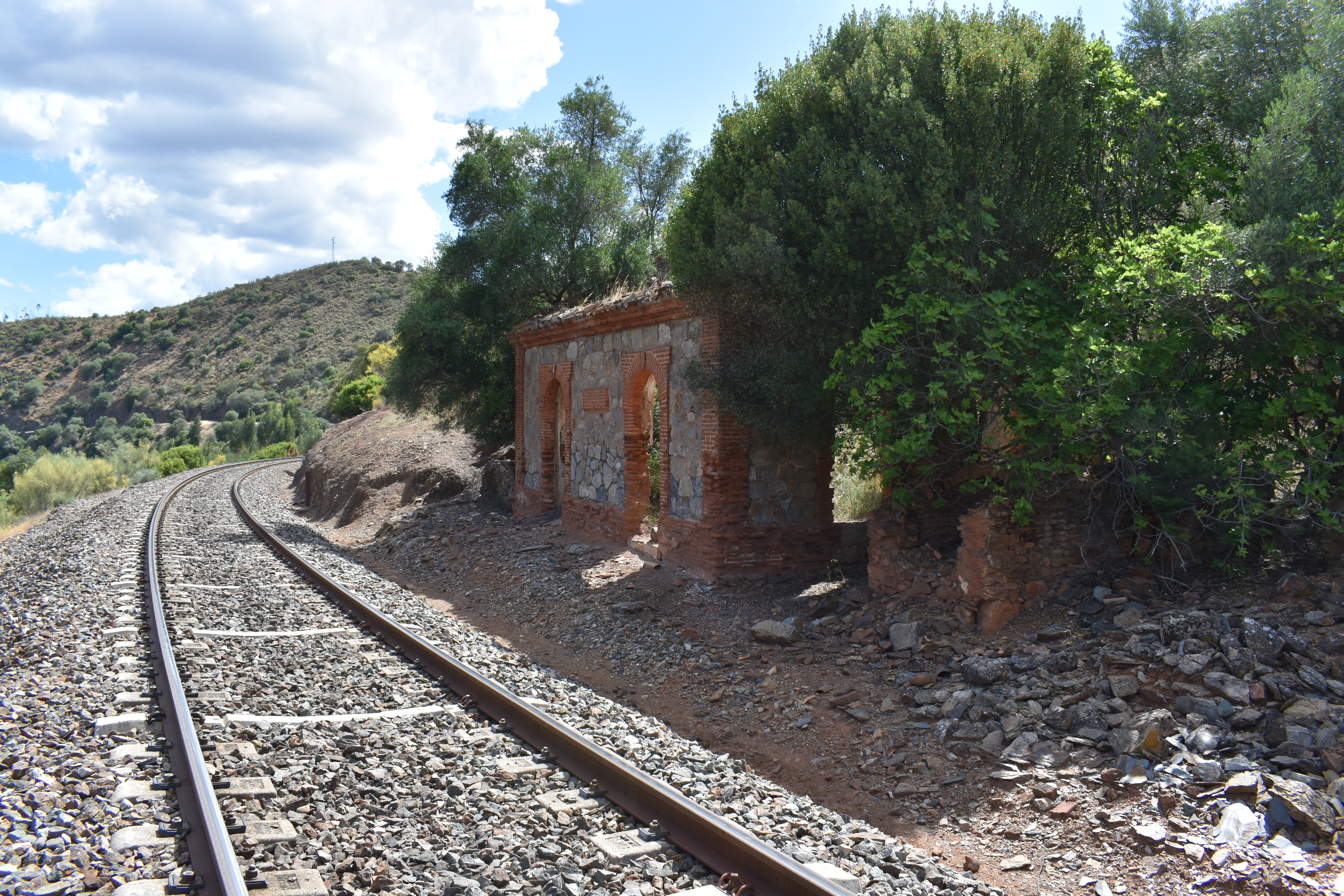
- The railway passing through the Sierra, 2022.

Overview
- Owner: Adif
- Area served: Iberian gauge
- Transit type: Rail transport

Operation
- Began operation: 1889
- Operator: Renfe

Technical
- System length: 180.8 km (112.3 mi)
- Track gauge: 1,668 mm (Iberian gauge)

The Zafra–Huelva railway is a 180.8-kilometre (112.3-mile) railway line part of the Spanish railway network. It is an Iberian gauge (1,668 mm), single-track, non-electrified line primarily used for regional traffic. According to Adif's classification, it is designated as "line 512".

The line's origins date back to the late 19th century, when construction began under the initiative of Spanish-German entrepreneur Guillermo Sundheim. Opened in 1889, its operation ended the isolation of the Andévalo and Sierra regions. The line also connected to several mining branch lines via junctions. As a result, for many years, it facilitated significant freight traffic from local mines to the Port of Huelva. Initially managed by the Compañía del Ferrocarril de Zafra a Huelva, the line came under the control of the state-owned RENFE in 1941.

The railway declined in the second half of the 20th century as the closure of many Huelva mines eliminated a key source of freight traffic. A lack of investment led to aging infrastructure and deteriorating services. Although closure was considered, modernization efforts began in the 2000s. Today, the line is part of the General Interest Railway Network and is managed by Adif.

== History ==
=== Origins and construction ===
The line's origins trace back to 1870, when the Spanish government offered a concession for the Zafra–Huelva railway in a public auction, which garnered no interest. In 1878, the concession was granted to Sundheim & Doetsch, led by Spanish-German entrepreneur Guillermo Sundheim. Initially, the line was intended to connect Zafra with the Riotinto mining railway, operational since 1875. However, various issues led to the decision to build a new route closer to the Portuguese border. In 1879, the project was assigned to chief engineer Miguel Muruve y Galán. The final concession was granted on August 20, 1881, with a subsidy exceeding eleven million pesetas. Sundheim began construction immediately, transferring the concession to the Compañía del Ferrocarril de Zafra a Huelva (ZH) in 1884. Work took place between 1881 and 1889, navigating the challenging terrain of Sierra Morena. Most construction materials were imported by sea. The Valdelamusa–Huelva section opened on July 23, 1886, and the Zafra–Valdelamusa section on January 1, 1889. Construction was arduous, requiring nearly twenty tunnels and nineteen iron bridges, including the notable Tres Fuentes Bridge.

The 179-kilometre (111-mile) line featured around twenty stations and sidings to manage traffic. In Huelva, a major railway complex, Huelva-Odiel, included a locomotive depot serving the entire line. (Note: Between 1886 and 1941, the Huelva-Odiel depot had around twenty-seven steam locomotives assigned to it. During the RENFE era, the fleet increased to as many as sixty locomotives (Jurado, Perejil, 1997, p. 59).)

=== Peak years ===
Although the line was not fully completed until 1889, partial operations began in 1884. Its opening connected the isolated Andévalo region with the rest of Huelva province, benefiting numerous municipalities. It also created a rail corridor linking Extremadura provinces with a maritime port on the Atlantic Ocean, facilitating the transport of agricultural and mineral resources. Passenger traffic exceeded initial projections, with 132,360 passengers transported in 1897. The ZH company acquired nearly thirty steam locomotives, including notable models from the British manufacturer Dübs.

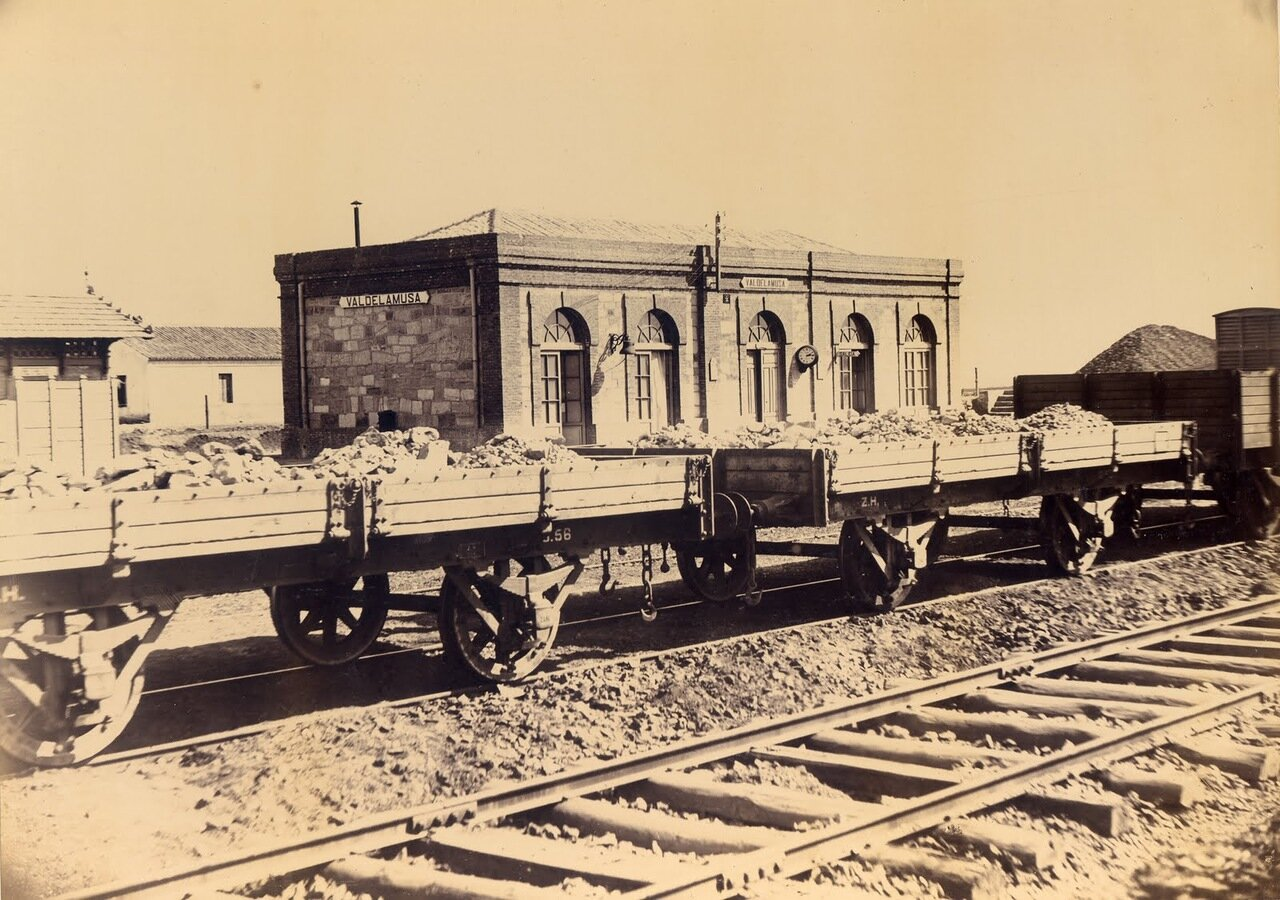
The Valdelamusa station handled significant mining traffic from branch lines.

Guillermo Sundheim aimed to make the Zafra–Huelva railway a key route for transporting minerals to the Port of Huelva. The presence of numerous mines along the route led to the construction of narrow-gauge branch lines connecting deposits to the railway. Over time, the line linked to mines such as Aguas Teñidas, El Perrunal, Lomero-Poyatos, Confesionarios, San Telmo, La Joya, Cueva de la Mora, and San Miguel. Due to differing track gauges, transshipment facilities were established for pyrite. The Valdelamusa and El Tamujoso stations became primary hubs for mineral traffic, as most branch lines converged there.

The El Perrunal mine generated the most pyrite traffic, with over 7.5 million tonnes transported between 1901 and 1960. Its Iberian-gauge branch line eliminated the need for transshipment. Other mines also contributed significantly: Lomero-Poyatos transported 1,553,812 tonnes from 1905 to 1960, San Telmo 1,327,275 tonnes from 1903 to 1960, and Cueva de la Mora over one million tonnes from 1888 to 1960.

Passenger traffic was also significant. In 1929, a Sentinel-Cammell railcar, nicknamed the "green louse" for its speed of 80 km/h (50 mph), began operating passenger services. In 1936, the Gibraleón–Ayamonte line opened, branching from Gibraleón, increasing the line's connectivity. That year, the Zafra–Jerez de los Caballeros railway also opened, aiming to reach the Portuguese border via Villanueva del Fresno.

=== RENFE era ===
In 1941, following the nationalization of Spain's Iberian-gauge railways, the Zafra–Huelva line was integrated into the newly formed RENFE. RENFE expanded the locomotive fleet, incorporating steam engines from the MZA and Andaluces networks, and later "American" locomotives from Norte. Due to poor infrastructure conditions, the track was fully renovated in the mid-1950s, and metal viaducts were replaced with concrete ones between 1954 and 1956. During this period, the line saw heavy traffic, with 421,125 passengers in 1955 and 416,995 in 1964.

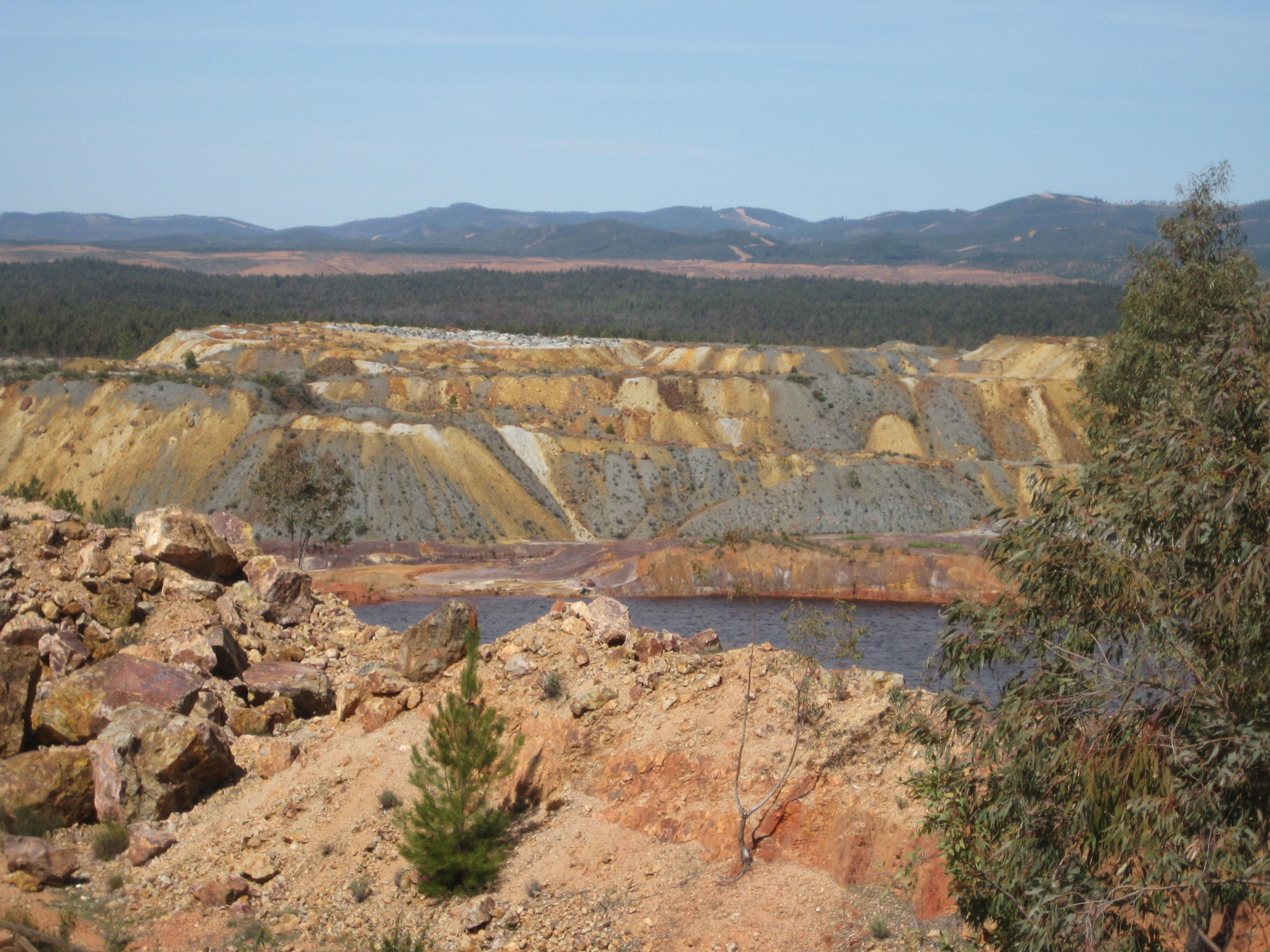
The San Telmo mines, a significant source of mineral traffic on the Zafra–Huelva railway.

In the 1960s, steam traction was phased out, and passenger services transitioned to railbuses and diesel railcars. However, the rise of road transport reduced passenger numbers. Mining branch lines, including the El Perrunal mine railway, closed in 1969, with the San Telmo branch shutting in the early 1970s. Mineral loading at Valdelamusa continued until February 1991. In 1976, the Huelva-Odiel station closed, and a new variant extended the line to Huelva-Término.

By the mid-1980s, despite the decline in Andévalo mining, the line maintained significant freight traffic, transporting phosphate from Cáceres, liquid fuels from the La Rábida Refinery, and sulfuric acid from the Minas de Almagrera plant in Sotiel Coronada. Pyrite trains from the Tharsis mines also used the line via Gibraleón. (Note: In 1981, RENFE established a link between the Gibraleón–Ayamonte railway and Corrales station on the Tharsis railway. At Corrales, mineral trains were sorted, and pyrite was loaded onto Iberian-gauge wagons for transport to the Chemical Park of Huelva. Although the Ayamonte line closed in 1987, (Jurado, 2006, p. 131) the Corrales–Gibraleón link remained operational until 1991 and was fully closed in 1999 (Muriel, 2004, p. 79).) However, chronic underinvestment led to outdated infrastructure and low speeds, and RENFE classified the line as highly unprofitable in 1984.

=== 21st century ===
In January 2005, RENFE split into Renfe Operadora and Adif, with the latter assuming control of the line. By then, both passenger and freight traffic had significantly declined. Between 2004 and 2016, €48 million was invested to upgrade the Zafra–Jabugo section, including track, sleeper, and ballast renewal. Numerous railway facilities were refurbished, and new passenger buildings and platforms were constructed. Post-2020, safety was improved by replacing the telephone block system with a Centralized Traffic Control (CTC) system. In 2022, infrastructure upgrades began on the Valdelamusa–Huelva section. In summer 2023, the line was closed to replace five bridges, extending their lifespan.

== Route and features ==
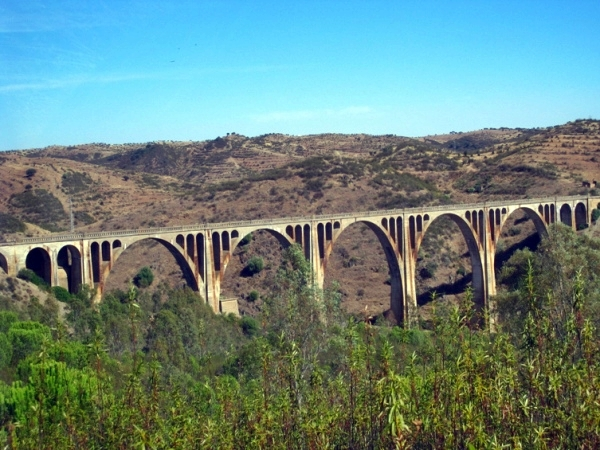
Alcolea Bridge, 2008.

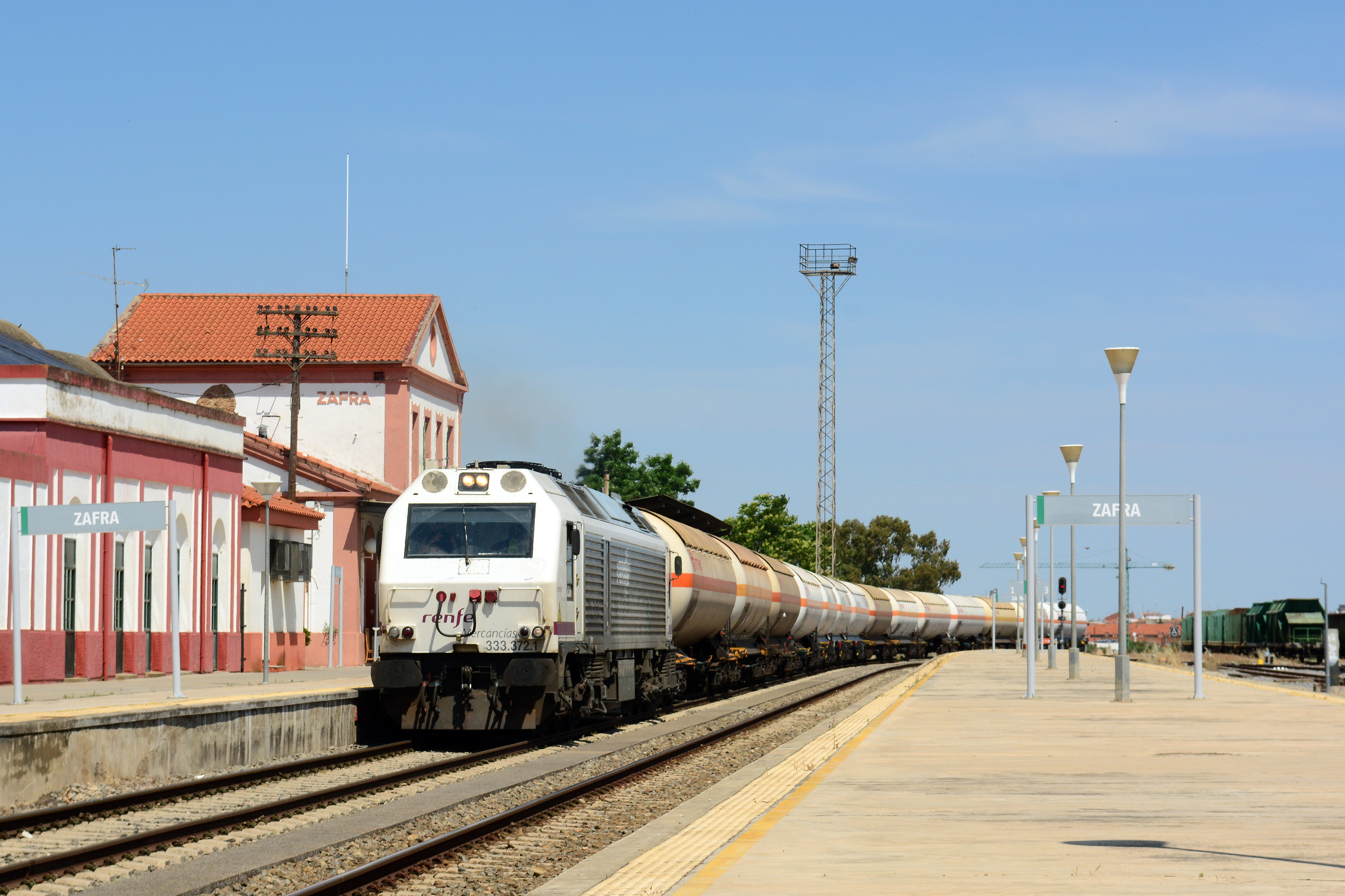
Badajoz–Huelva ammonia train at Zafra station, 2018.

The Zafra–Huelva railway is a conventional, 180.8-kilometre (112.3-mile), single-track, non-electrified line with Iberian gauge. The challenging terrain of the Andévalo, particularly between Cumbres Mayores and Valdelamusa, necessitated eighteen tunnels, most over 100 meters long, with the Almonaster tunnel extending 1,350 meters. The line includes nineteen bridges and viaducts, notably those over the Múrtigas River, Tres Fuentes, and Alcolea. At Zafra, it connects to the Mérida–Los Rosales railway and Zafra–Jerez de los Caballeros railway, and in Huelva, it links to the Seville–Huelva railway. (Note: The connection to the Huelva Chemical Pole and port is via the Seville–Huelva railway, specifically from the nearby Las Metas Junction (Jiménez, 2016, p. 31).)

Originally, the line terminated at Huelva-Odiel railway station, with branches to the port. After the station's closure in July 1976, the "Peguerillas variant" was built to connect directly to the Seville–Huelva line and Huelva-Término railway station. This eliminated the track between kilometers 172 and 179, which was later dismantled. The line now ends at Huelva-Mercancías railway station.

== Rail traffic ==
The Zafra–Huelva railway has limited, primarily regional traffic, as it lies outside Spain's main transport corridors. Freight trains between Extremadura and Huelva, and those from the Chemical Park of Huelva, dominate the line. Passenger traffic is minimal, served by Media Distancia Line 73 operated by Renfe. According to 2021 Adif data, the line averages four daily trains in both directions, with 40% capacity utilization.

== See also ==
- List of stations of the Zafra–Huelva railway
- Buitrón railway
- Guadiana railway

== Bibliography ==
- Flores Caballero, Manuel (2011). Las fuerzas de la revolución industrial en la fiebre minera del XIX [The forces of the industrial revolution in the 19th-century mining fever] (in Spanish). Fundación para la investigación Juan Manuel Flores Jimeno. ISBN 978-84-937687-8-2.
- Jiménez, Miguel (2016). "El Puerto de Huelva y el ferrocarril: del mineral a la intermodalidad" [The Port of Huelva and the railway: From minerals to intermodality] (PDF). Vía Libre (in Spanish) (610). Fundación de los Ferrocarriles Españoles: 28–36. ISSN 1134-1416.
- Jurado, José Manuel; Perejil, Pedro (1997). "Historia y actualidad del ferrocarril Zafra-Huelva" [History and current state of the Zafra–Huelva railway]. Asociación de amigos del ferrocarril «Cuenca Minera de Río Tinto» (in Spanish). Nerva.
- Jurado, José Manuel (2006). Emilio Romero Macías (ed.). "La línea Zafra-Huelva, un olvidado corredor ferroviario con potencialidades" [The Zafra–Huelva line, a forgotten railway corridor with potential]. The Railways in the Province of Huelva: A Journey Through the Past (in Spanish). University of Huelva: 105–129.
- Lama, José María (2004). La amargura de la memoria. República y Guerra en Zafra (1931-1936) [The bitterness of memory: Republic and War in Zafra (1931–1936)] (in Spanish). Badajoz: Diputación de Badajoz.
- León Vela, José; Martínez Roldán, Nieves (2001). La reconversión de áreas industriales obsoletas [The reconversion of obsolete industrial areas] (in Spanish). Vol. I. University of Seville. ISBN 978-84-472-0670-4.
- Mojarro Bayo, Ana María (2010). La historia del puerto de Huelva (1873-1930) [The history of the Port of Huelva (1873–1930)] (in Spanish). University of Huelva Publications/Port of Huelva. ISBN 978-84-16621-15-6.
- Muriel, Manuel José (2004). "El ferrocarril estratégico de Huelva a Ayamonte" [The strategic Huelva–Ayamonte railway]. Vía Libre (in Spanish) (479). Fundación de los Ferrocarriles Españoles: 77–79. ISSN 1134-1416.
- Muriel, Manuel José (2006). Emilio Romero Macías (ed.). "El ferrocarril estratégico de Huelva a Ayamonte: sus orígenes y construcción" [The strategic Huelva–Ayamonte railway: Its origins and construction]. The Railways in the Province of Huelva: A Journey Through the Past (in Spanish). University of Huelva: 131–156.
- Peña Guerrero, María Antonia (1998). Clientelismo político y poderes periféricos durante la Restauración: Huelva (1874-1923) [Political clientelism and peripheral powers during the Restoration: Huelva (1874–1923)] (in Spanish). Huelva: University of Huelva. ISBN 978-84-17066-00-0.
- Romero, Emilio; Manzano, José Ramón; Membrillo, Francisco (2006). Emilio Romero Macías (ed.). "Ferrocarriles mineros en la línea Zafra-Huelva" [Mining railways on the Zafra–Huelva line]. The Railways in the Province of Huelva: A Journey Through the Past (in Spanish). University of Huelva: 321–334.
- Sánchez, Francisco (2006). Emilio Romero Macías (ed.). "El ferrocarril Tharsis-Río Odiel" [The Tharsis–Río Odiel railway]. The Railways in the Province of Huelva: A Journey Through the Past (in Spanish). University of Huelva: 207–227.
- Wais, Francisco (1974). Historia de los ferrocarriles españoles [History of Spanish railways] (in Spanish). Madrid: Editora Nacional.
