= Pedro Nolasco de Soto =

Spanish civil engineer and sportsperson (1848–1908)

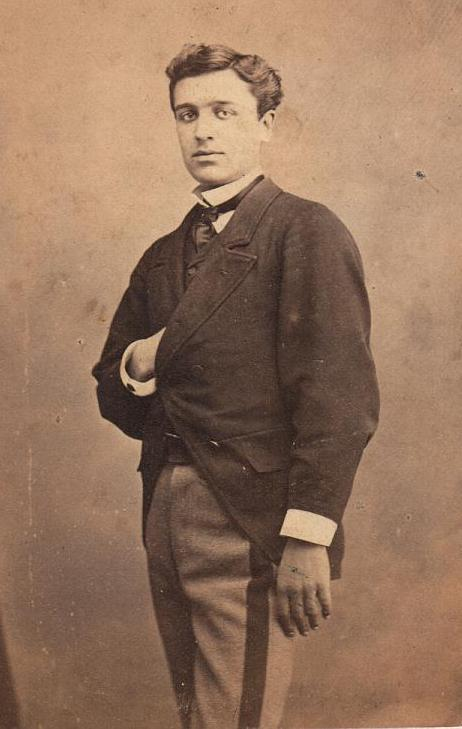
- Pedro Nolasco de Soto in 1873
- Born: Pedro Nolasco de Soto y Colom; 20 January 1848; Seville, Spain
- Died: 26 July 1908 (aged 60); Huelva, Spain
- Citizenship: Spanish
- Occupations: Civil engineer; Sportsperson
- Known for: Co-president of Recreativo de Huelva

Pedro Nolasco de Soto y Colom (20 January 1848 – 26 July 1908) was a Spanish civil engineer who was named co-president of Recreativo de Huelva in its second-ever meeting in 1889.

== Early life and education ==
Pedro Nolasco de Soto was born in Seville on 20 January 1848, as the first-born son of Maria Luisa Colom y Colom and Cádiz-born Ricardo de Soto y Lavaggi, a banker.

As the son of a well-off family from Seville, Nolasco de Soto completed his studies abroad, doing so at the Catholic Institute in Liverpool in the 1860s, together with two of his cousins from Jerez de la Frontera, such as Pedro Nolasco González y Soto. He then studied Civil Engineering in Madrid, where he was the second-best of his class in 1869, and where he obtained his diploma in 1871.

== Professional career ==
After graduating, Nolasco de Soto carried out several public works projects in the province of Seville throughout the 1870s, which included the construction of a bridge over the Guadalquivir, the construction of the Seville-Huelva railway line, where he checked weights and loads on the Manzanilla and Sanlúcar la Mayor sections of that railway. For the latter case, he had to make several commissions between Paris and London in 1876 for iron material to build the line, which was finally completed and opened to traffic on 1 April 1880.

A few months later, on 10 September, the German businessman Guillermo Sundheim appointed him Chief Engineer for the construction of the Huelva-Zafra railway line, and upon its completion, he was appointed its company's director, a position which he retained until his death. Between 1897 and 1901, the company's income was always larger than its expenses, and its profits considerably increased. He also helped Sundheim in many other initiatives, such as in the first chalet that he built in Punta Umbría.

For his services in the field of public works, Nolasco de Soto was decorated with both the Order of Isabella the Catholic and the Order of Charles III, which were awarded to him by King Alfonso XII.

== Sporting career ==
In 1876, together with his younger brother Luis, he was a founding member of the Sociedad Sevillana de Regatas, a sport that he discovered whilst in Liverpool, and then serving the society as a director for many years. Shortly after moving to Huelva in 1880, he co-founded another sporting association, the Sociedad Colombina Onubense.

On 23 December 1889, Nolasco de Soto was one of only two Spanish involved in the second founding meeting of Recreativo de Huelva, the other being José Muñoz Pérez, in which he was appointed co-president, together with Charles Wilson Adam. His appointment was most likely not only to demonstrate the presence of members of the Huelva bourgeoisie in the club, but also because of the convenience of having a president of Spanish nationality, with Nolasco de Soto being the chosen Spaniard due to his knowledge of the English language, and perhaps because of his previous experience as a director of a sailing club, not to mention that he was the director of the Huelva-Zafra railway tracks, which bordered the fields where the club played football and cricket at that time. Either way, his role in the club was simply honorary, and likewise, in 1892, he disappeared from the board.

== Personal life and death ==
On 3 April 1899, the 51-year-old Nolasco de Soto married the 35-year-old Rosa Maria Aldaz y Sancho, and the couple had a son, Pedro Nolasco de Soto y Aldaz.

Nolasco de Soto died in Huelva on 26 July 1908, at the age of 60.
