= Gil Marquez =

Coordinates: 37°51′N 6°51′W

Gil Marquez is a hamlet of the municipality of Almonaster la Real, in Andalusia (Spain), with 73 inhabitants. It is 8 kilometres from Almonaster.

== Economy ==
Its inhabitants are agriculturalist and ranchers.

== Monuments ==
- Bridge of Las Tres Fuentes
- Church of "El Carmen".

== Local celebration ==
- Local festival of "El Carmen" in July.

== Environs ==
- Spa el Manzano
- Arroyo el Moro
