= Gibraleón-Ayamonte railway =

Former railway line in Spain

Gibraleón-Ayamonte line
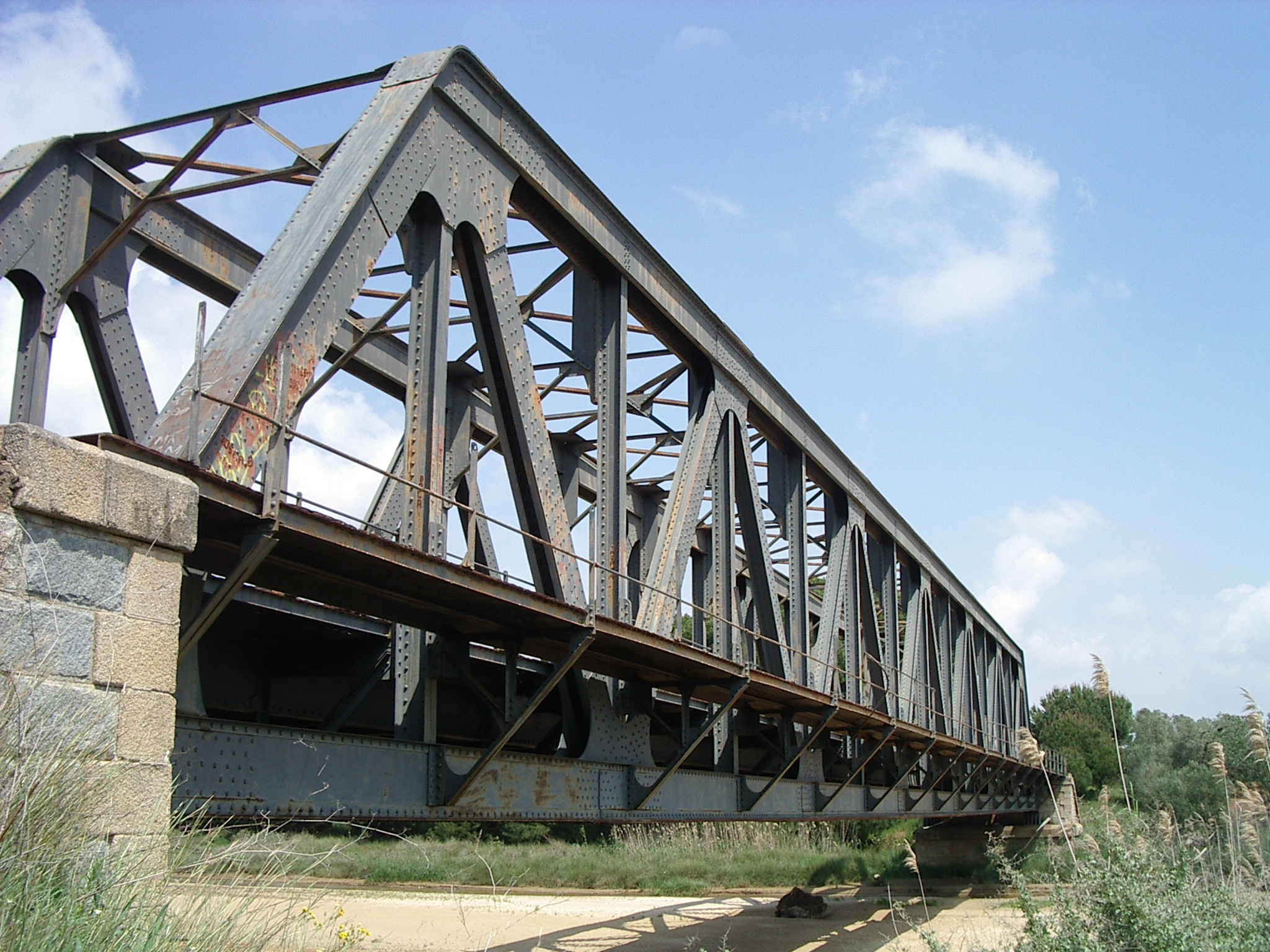
- Bridge of the Tavirona, belonging to the line.

Overview
- Native name: Línea Gibraleón-Ayamonte
- Area served: Iberian-gauge railways
- Transit type: Rail transport
- Line number: Gibraleón-Ayamonte

Operation
- Began operation: August 14, 1936
- Ended operation: 1987/1999

Technical
- System length: 49 km

The Gibraleón-Ayamonte railway, also known as the Huelva-Ayamonte, was a 49-kilometer-long Iberian gauge Spanish railway line that came to operate in the province of Huelva. The line was in operation between 1936 and 1987, covering the western coast of Huelva.

The origins of the line date back to the end of the 19th century, when its possible construction was considered. During the following decades there were several projects and work was even begun, but various eventualities delayed its materialization. The railroad entered service in 1936, shortly after the outbreak of the Civil War, and during its first years of existence it had a very active traffic. However, the route never had continuity in the Portuguese territory, which seriously limited its capacity. During the 1980s the line went through a deep decline marked by lack of investment, poor infrastructure maintenance and very low traffic. In 1987 its closure was decreed, and it was subsequently dismantled.

At the beginning, the line was separated from the Huelva-Zafra railway at Gibraleón and continued its route until it reached Ayamonte, next to the Portuguese border, crossing municipalities such as Aljaraque, Cartaya, Lepe or Isla Cristina. Nowadays, the so-called "Vía verde Litoral" (Coastal Greenway) runs along its old route.

== History ==
=== Origins and construction ===
As early as 1893, the construction of a railway line linking Ayamonte with Huelva was considered, a project in which some municipalities in the area showed interest given the total lack of railway connections. Subsequently, the MZA company —which already owned a line linking Seville and Huelva— showed interest in this possibility, carrying out studies with a view to undertaking construction work. Originally, the railroad was conceived for canning transport, from the ports of origin, mainly from the port of Isla Cristina, in the same way that the grape railroad was responsible for the same in Jerez de la Frontera. However, this project would differ significantly from the railroad that would end up being built.

In August 1913 the Ministry of Development carried out an auction to put out to tender the works of the future line, being the winning bidder the Sociedad Española de Ferrocarriles Secundarios (SEFS). This company, in turn, would create the "Compañía del Ferrocarril de Huelva a Ayamonte" so that it would assume the construction and operation of the line. The works began at the end of that year and progressed at a good pace, but the outbreak in August 1914 of the First World War brought the works to a standstill due to the lack of capital. After long years of lethargy and legal battles, during the dictatorship of Primo de Rivera, the works were continued by the Explotación de Ferrocarriles por el Estado. Construction continued beyond 1931, after the proclamation of the Second Republic.

=== Exploitation ===
The line entered service in August 1936, shortly after the outbreak of the Civil War, being put into operation by the military of the rebel side. The operation of the line would be entrusted to MZA and the Compañía del Ferrocarril de Zafra a Huelva. From August 1, 1940, the line was opened to passenger traffic, since until then it had only been for freight. In 1941, after the railway nationalization, the line became part of the RENFE network. After the outbreak of the Spanish Civil War, the original plans for this railway line changed, and Franco's troops decided to use it to transport armaments from the Portuguese border to the interior of the peninsula. One of the vestiges of the plans to bring the railroad to Isla Cristina was the bridge over the Carreras estuary, to reach the port of Isla Cristina, designed exclusively as a railway bridge and which would later be used as a bridge for road traffic with a single lane of traffic, being until 1978 the only one that linked the city to the north.

The layout of the line was very flat, with very little gradient and few sharp curves, favored by the orography present in the area. Some of its most singular constructions were the bridge over the Piedras River, between Lepe and Cartaya, a typical steel construction in the style of those built at the end of the nineteenth century, and the metal bridge that allows crossing the Odiel river, located just outside Gibraleón.

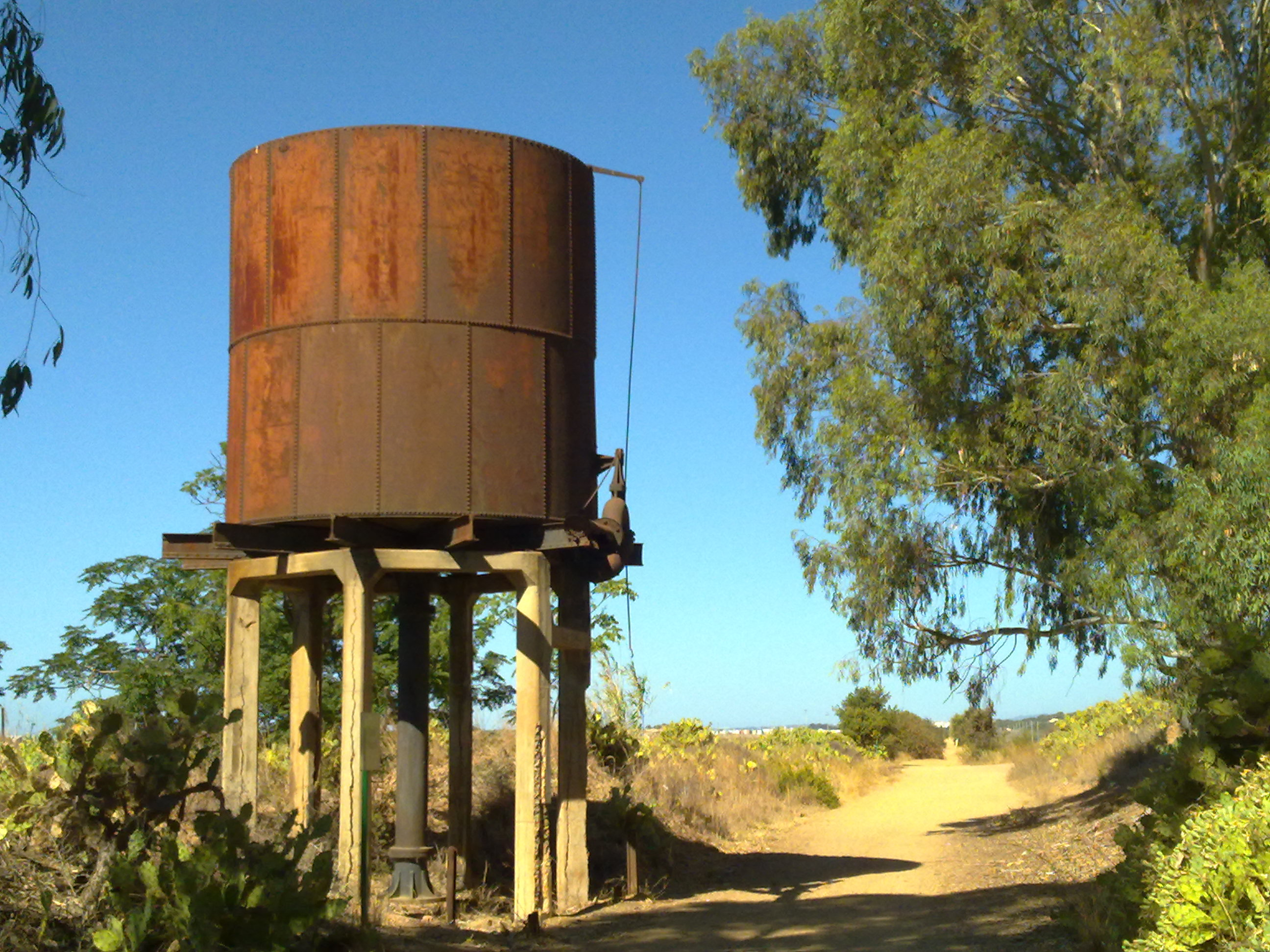
Old water tank at the exit of the Isla Cristina station.

RENFE would build, in 1981, a link of the Gibraleón-Ayamonte line with the Tharsis railroad. This branch line started at the La Mezquita halt and reached the Corrales station, where the sorting of the mining trains was carried out. For this purpose, RENFE added a third rail to the original track —which had a gauge of 1220 mm—, which allowed the Iberian gauge trains (1668 mm) to reach the Corrales facilities.

From the 1960s onwards, when the bus and private vehicle began to become widespread, the railroad began to lose passengers. Although in the 1980s the population served between Gibraleón and Ayamonte reached 60,000 inhabitants, the line became loss-making, and the Junta de Andalucía had to cover the operating costs to keep it in service. (Note: In 1984, many railway lines considered by the State as highly loss-making were closed, although at first the Junta de Andalucía came to the rescue of the Gibraleón-Ayamonte railroad. However, in 1987 the Junta de Andalucía informed RENFE of its refusal to continue subsidizing it (Ramos, 2006). Some author has pointed out that the Andalusian autonomous administration did not do enough to save the line, as it concentrated its investments in improving the roads in the area —while the line maintained its deficiencies— (Jurado, 2006, p. 109).) The chronic lack of maintenance and investment caused the railroad to lose competitiveness. In general, the low frequency, the slowness, the distance of some of its stops to the town it serves, among other factors, would trigger the decision to close the line to traffic.

The last train to run on the line was on September 26, 1987, after which it was closed.

=== Closure and dismantling ===
Some years after the closure of the line, the dismantling of the track began. At the beginning of the 1990s, several proposals were made for its possible reopening and improvement of the infrastructure, but this possibility did not materialize. It so happened that at that time a good part of the tracks had already been lifted, while some areas of the track had even been urbanized. Although most of the line was closed to train traffic in 1987, the section between the stations of Gibraleón and Corrales —through the branch line built in 1981— remained in service for freight traffic for a few more years, until 1991. This section was definitively closed in 1999.

== Vía Verde Litoral ==
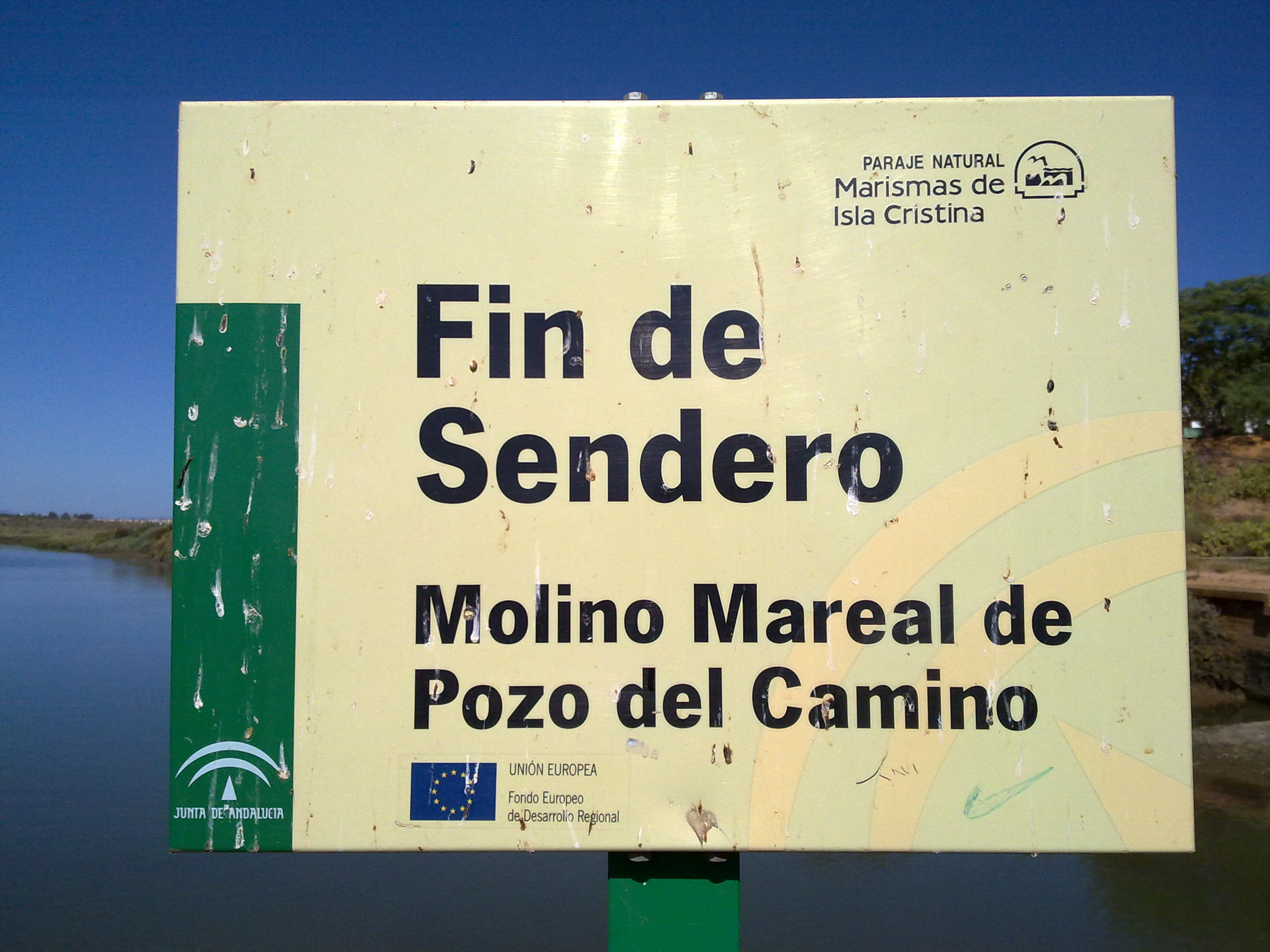
End of one of the itineraries of the path in the area of Molino de El Pintado.

After falling into disuse, the ties were used to build forest roads (greenways), promenades (coastal promenade of Isla Cristina) and even enclosures of farms (Ayamonte bus station), taking advantage of the metal of the track for new foundries. In the 1990s the route began to be rehabilitated as a greenway, however, the company would be impossible to maintain once completed satisfactorily and would be abandoned again a few years later.

Some of the stations along the way received other uses; in Ayamonte it would become the new bus station; in Lepe the track area would become an urban park and the station a cocktail bar; that of Isla Cristina a social center; that of La Redondela, sports facilities; that of Cartaya, a service station for its Freight Transportation Center. Others, however, would fall into disuse, as was the case of the remote halt of Aljaraque. The route of the old line is still used as a greenway, although without funds for its maintenance. It is known as the Vía Verde Litoral, with a bicycle lane on one side of the old route, although its state of conservation does not allow stable circulation.

== Future plans ==
Due to the increase in population, laying a line between the most populated municipalities of the province, located just between the capital and the border, and also take advantage of its tourist and transport demand, would be sufficient in principle to implement again, with a more reasonable route, a railroad line in this area. The current population between the original municipalities of the route would be 121,160 in 2012 (Aljaraque, Ayamonte, Cartaya, Gibraleón, Isla Cristina and Lepe), however, towns near the line, such as Islantilla, La Antilla, Isla Canela and even Isla Cristina, have a summer population that exceeds 50,000 inhabitants in each of them, which added to the starting population of the line (Huelva, with about 150,000 inhabitants), would offer a highly demanded service.

The projected construction of the new high-speed line linking the Spanish city of Huelva with the Portuguese city of Faro, would necessarily involve laying a line through this area, and although it would not maintain the same route, it would be necessary to establish at least one technical maintenance post in the area. It has been suggested the possibility of establishing it in El Empalme, between the cities of Ayamonte, Isla Cristina and Lepe, as it is almost equidistant between the three, and thus even be able to provide passenger service (with a combined winter population of just over 70,000 inhabitants). In any case, in the aftermath of the 2008 crisis, the bets of the Spanish and Portuguese governments are not to create more links between the two countries than strictly necessary.

== See also ==
- Riotinto Railway

== Bibliography ==
- García Raya, Joaquín (2006). "Cronología básica del ferrocarril español de vía ancha" (PDF). IV Congreso Historia Ferroviaria: Málaga, septiembre de 2006 (in Spanish). Consejería de Obras Públicas y Transportes de la Junta de Andalucía.
- Jurado, José Manuel; Perejil, Pedro (1997). "Historia y actualidad del ferrocarril Zafra-Huelva". Asociación de amigos del ferrocarril «Cuenca Minera de Río Tinto» (in Spanish). Nerva, Huelva.
- Jurado, José Manuel (2006). "La línea Zafra-Huelva, un olvidado corredor ferroviario con potencialidades". Los Ferrocarriles en la Provincia de Huelva: Un Recorrido Por el Pasado (in Spanish). Emilio Romero Macías (dir.). Universidad de Huelva: 105–129.
- Mendoza Abreu, Josefa M. (1985). "Contribución al estudio del habla rural y marinera de Lepe (Huelva)". Diputación Provincial de Huelva (in Spanish).
- Mojarro Bayo, Ana María (2010). La historia del puerto de Huelva (1873-1930) (in Spanish). Servicio de publicaciones de la Universidad de Huelva/Puerto de Huelva. ISBN 978-84-16621-15-6.
- Muriel, Manuel José (2004). "El ferrocarril estratégico de Huelva a Ayamonte". Vía Libre, la revista del ferrocarril (in Spanish) (479). Fundación de los Ferrocarriles Españoles: 77–79. ISSN 1134-1416.
- Muriel, Manuel José (2006). "El ferrocarril estratégico de Huelva a Ayamonte: sus orígenes y construcción". Los Ferrocarriles en la Provincia de Huelva: Un Recorrido Por el Pasado (in Spanish). Emilio Romero Macías (dir.). Universidad de Huelva: 131–156.
- Ramos, Rodolfo (2006). "Historia de la política ferroviaria de la Junta de Andalucía (1980-2005)" (PDF). IV Congreso Historia Ferroviaria: Málaga, septiembre de 2006 (in Spanish). Consejería de Obras Públicas y Transportes de la Junta de Andalucía.
- Sánchez, Francisco (2006). "El ferrocarril Tharsis-Río Odiel". Los Ferrocarriles en la Provincia de Huelva: Un Recorrido Por el Pasado (in Spanish). Emilio Romero Macías (dir.). Universidad de Huelva: 207–227.
