= José Muñoz Pérez =

Spanish sportsperson

- Born: José Muñoz Pérez; 7 April 1869; Huelva, Spain
- Died: 7 September 1921 (aged 52); Madrid, Spain
- Citizenship: Spanish
- Occupations: Journalist; Sportsperson; Politician
- Known for: Co-founder of Recreativo de Huelva

Vice President of Recreativo de Huelva
- In office 1903–1906
- Succeeded by: Manuel Pérez de Guzmán

José Muñoz Pérez (7 April 1869 – 7 September 1921) was a Spanish sports journalist who co-founded Recreativo de Huelva in 1889.

== Early life and education ==
José Muñoz Pérez was born in Huelva on 7 April 1869, as the son of Josefa Pérez Ortiz (1842–1916) and Francisco Muñoz Morales (1838–1878), founder of the Muñoz Printing Press, which later became the property of his widow and sons. His father was an editor of the Huelva newspaper La Provincia since its inception in 1873, and who had also previously edited another newspaper, El Porvenir de Huelva, which began in 1869. In the 1870s, the family lived at number 14 Calle Concepción, where they also had a printing press.

In his youth, Muñoz spent several years studying in England, so he spoke English perfectly, and in 1887–88, he sent several articles to La Provincia from London. Later, his brother Francisco, who also studied in London, did the same trick in 1899–1900.

== Sporting career ==
=== First steps of Recreativo ===
On 14 May 1885, the 16-year-old Muñoz wrote a cricket article about a match between the Huelva and Minas de Riotinto clubs, which had been organized by the Doctor William Alexander Mackay, and held on the grounds opposite the Gas Factory, owned by Charles Wilson Adam. Some of his sports articles for the newspaper were written in both English and Spanish, and sometimes he signed with the pseudonym "Bad Leg" given that he had a slight limp.

On 16 October 1889, he was among the founders of the Gymnastics and Fencing Society, to which he was appointed secretary, and just two months later, Muñoz, together with Mackay and Adam, was one of the founders of what later became Recreativo de Huelva, being the only Spanish director at the club's founding meeting on 18 December, and was also ratified as a member of the board at the subsequent meeting on 23 December 1889. His knowledge of the English language, his fondness for British sports, and his position within the local press made him the ideal candidate to serve as a liaison with the institutions and society of Huelva. According to some sources, he even played some football matches for Huelva, starting as a defender, despite his slight limp.

After the departure of the British Edward Palin, he assumed the position of Secretary of the club in 1891, and as such, he was a member of the organizing committee of the events organized by Recreativo in commemoration of the fourth Centenary of the Discovery of America by Christopher Columbus, which consisted of several sporting events that took place in the months of August, September, and October.

=== Sports journalism ===
Muñoz was also a correspondent in Huelva for the weekly El Sport, published in Madrid, and in February 1892, he wrote a brief summary of the sporting activities of Recreativo from its foundation until then. In this summary, he stated that Recreativo has "held important games of tennis, cricket, and mainly football, which have been played against the clubs of Rio Tinto FC, Tharsis, Seville FC, and other towns. He also stated that Club Recreativo was going to start the construction works of a Velodrome at the beginning of April, on some land located in front of the Gran Hotel Colón, and likewise, the so-called Campo del Velódromo was inaugurated on 20 August, just in time to host the sporting events of the fourth Centenary of the Discovery of America organized by Recreativo.

In 1897, Muñoz was president of the organizing committee of bicycle races at Campo del Velódromo, and in 1898, he represented Recreativo in the cycling events held in Calañas, as part of the festival program of this municipality.

Muñoz created and owned the Papelería Inglesa, one of the most emblematic establishments in Huelva in the 20th century, which distributed the newspaper and published local books, brochures, programs, posters, and postcards from Huelva. Both the family business and the newspaper itself were closely linked, through various commercial agreements, to the powerful Rio Tinto Company Limited.

=== Copa Muñoz ===
In 1891, most of the founders and promoters of Recreativo, including Muñoz, founded an organization called "Seamen's Institute", which was meant to provide shelter, entertainment, and company to the English sailors who anchored their ships at the port of Huelva for relatively long periods while they waited for the mineral and finished loading it onto the ships.

In 1903, after many years as secretary, he became the vice-president of Recreativo, and later that year, Muñoz's proposal to create an annual tournament exclusively for football between the Recreativo members against the British sailors of the Seamen's Institute was approved at the board meeting held on 9 December 1903. Muñoz decided to follow the footsteps of the Copa del Rey, which had been inaugurated earlier that year with a cup donated by Alfonso XIII, and ordered a cup made of silver in London, with the first match taking place on 2 January 1904, and being won by the British. This was followed by another match on 30 April, which was postponed to 6 November to coincide with the inauguration of the new facilities at the Velodrome; the British won again 4–2. This Cup, sometimes called Copa Muñoz, eventually became the definitive property of Huelva in 1911, thus becoming the oldest trophy kept by Recreativo in its museum.

Muñoz held the club's vice-presidency for three years, until 1906, when he was replaced by the Spaniard Manuel Pérez de Guzmán, but he remained a director of the club until 1912.

== Personal life ==
In 1895, the 26-year-old Muñoz married María Luisa de Vargas Soto (1870–1959), sister of Pedro Nolasco de Soto, also one of the founders of the Recreativo, and the couple had six children: Josefa, María, Rosario, José (1903–1967), Federico, and Francisco; they all studied in Folkestone, a town south of London. Their second daughter, Maria Luisa, known to family and friends as Luchy, was a good tennis player, winning tournaments at the Recreativo in 1914. A very prominent figure in the cultural life of Huelva at that time, she was a pioneer as a writer, newspaper editor, and poet, publishing, among other books, Bosque sin salida, which was prefaced by her friend Juan Ramón Jiménez. She was also the first translator of the work of the Portuguese Fernando Pessoa into Spanish.

His eldest son José, an industrial engineer, was a director of Recreativo in 1928 and 1929, as well as President of the provincial council of Huelva from 1948 to 1951, a member of the Cortes, and for many years General Manager of the Sevillana Company.

== Later life ==
Muñoz was a town councillor for many years, and mayor of Huelva in 1916. He was also President of the Círculo Mercantil y Agrícola between 1918 and 1919.

== Death ==
Muñoz died in Madrid on 7 September 1921, at the age of 52.
