= Mérida-Los Rosales railway =

Railway line in Spain

Mérida-Los Rosales railway line
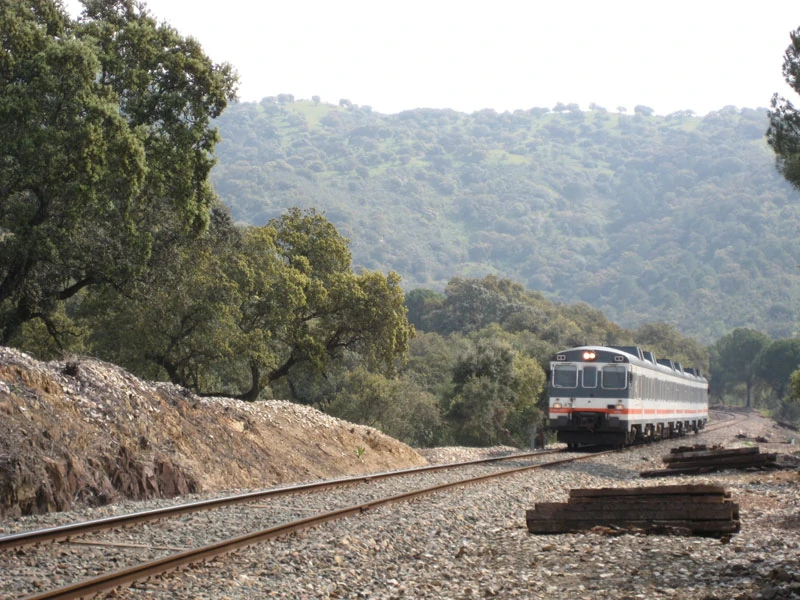
- The line near Pedroso

Overview
- Status: in use
- Owner: ADIF
- Locale: Extremadura, Andalusia, Spain
- Termini: Mérida; Los Rosales
- Stations: 16 open, 2 closed

Service
- Type: Heavy rail
- Operator(s): Renfe

History
- Opened: 16 January 1885

Technical
- Line length: 204.3 km (126.9 mi)
- Number of tracks: 1
- Track gauge: Iberian
- Electrification: no

The Mérida-Los Rosales railway is a Spanish railway line that connects the Extremaduran city of Mérida with Zafra and Los Rosales in Andalusia, a railway junction near to Seville.

The railway line is 204.3km long, it is Iberian gauge (1668mm), non electrified and on a single track. It has been owned by many railway operators, currently it is owned by Adif and it is catalogued as line 516.

== History and Traffic ==
The concession for the line was given in 1869, and work progressed slowly over the next few years, culminating in 1885. There are a number of different services that use the line. Services that use the full line are Media Distancia and Regional Exprés services, mostly running from Cáceres to Sevilla Santa Justa. The Cercanías Sevilla line C-3 uses the railway up to Cazalla-Constantina, and services along the Zafra-Huelva railway, when continuing to Mérida, use the Mérida-Zafra section. A daily Seville-Cáceres service continues to Madrid Atocha.

== Gallery ==
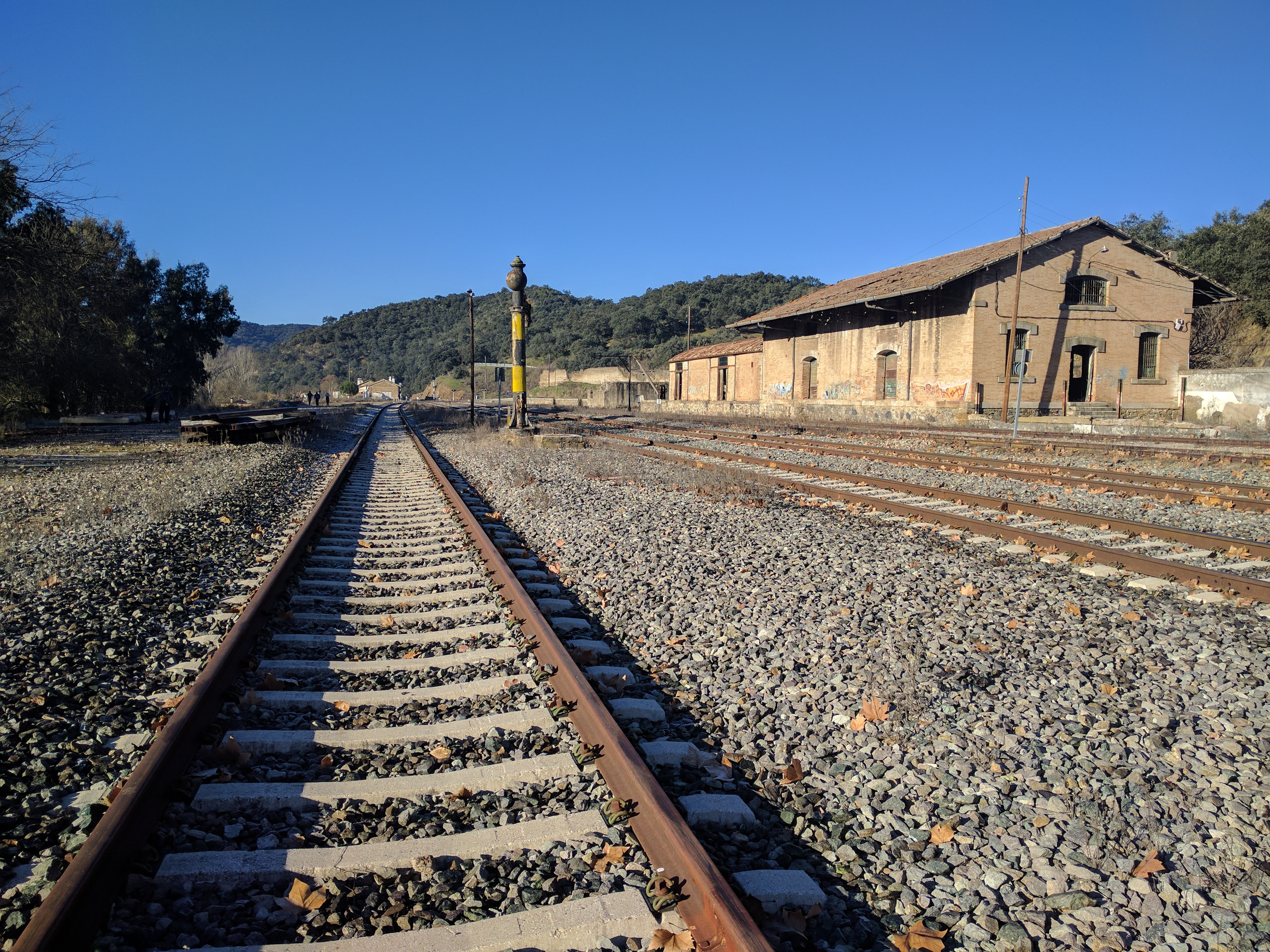
Cazalla-Constantina railway station.

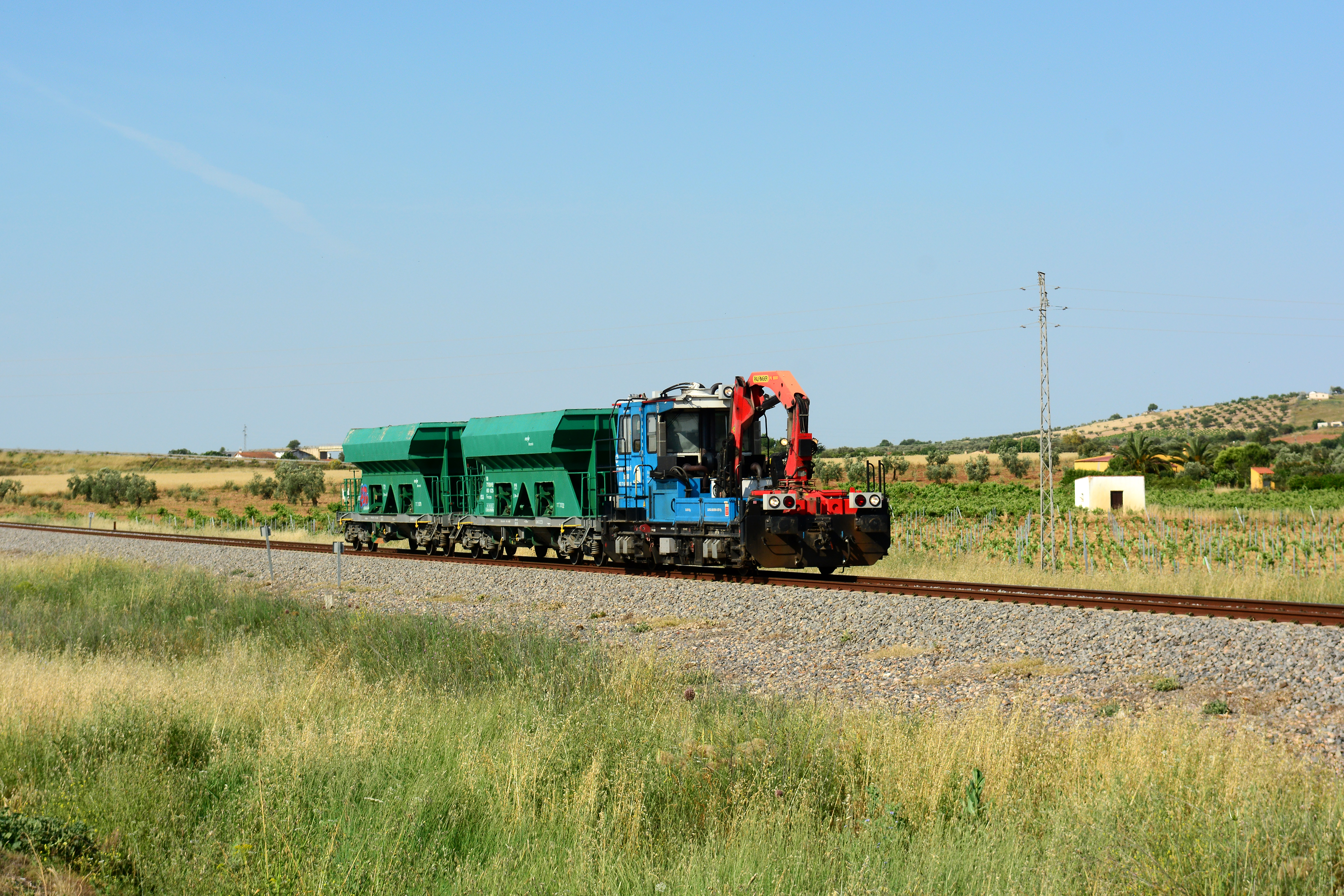
An infrastructure train on the line.

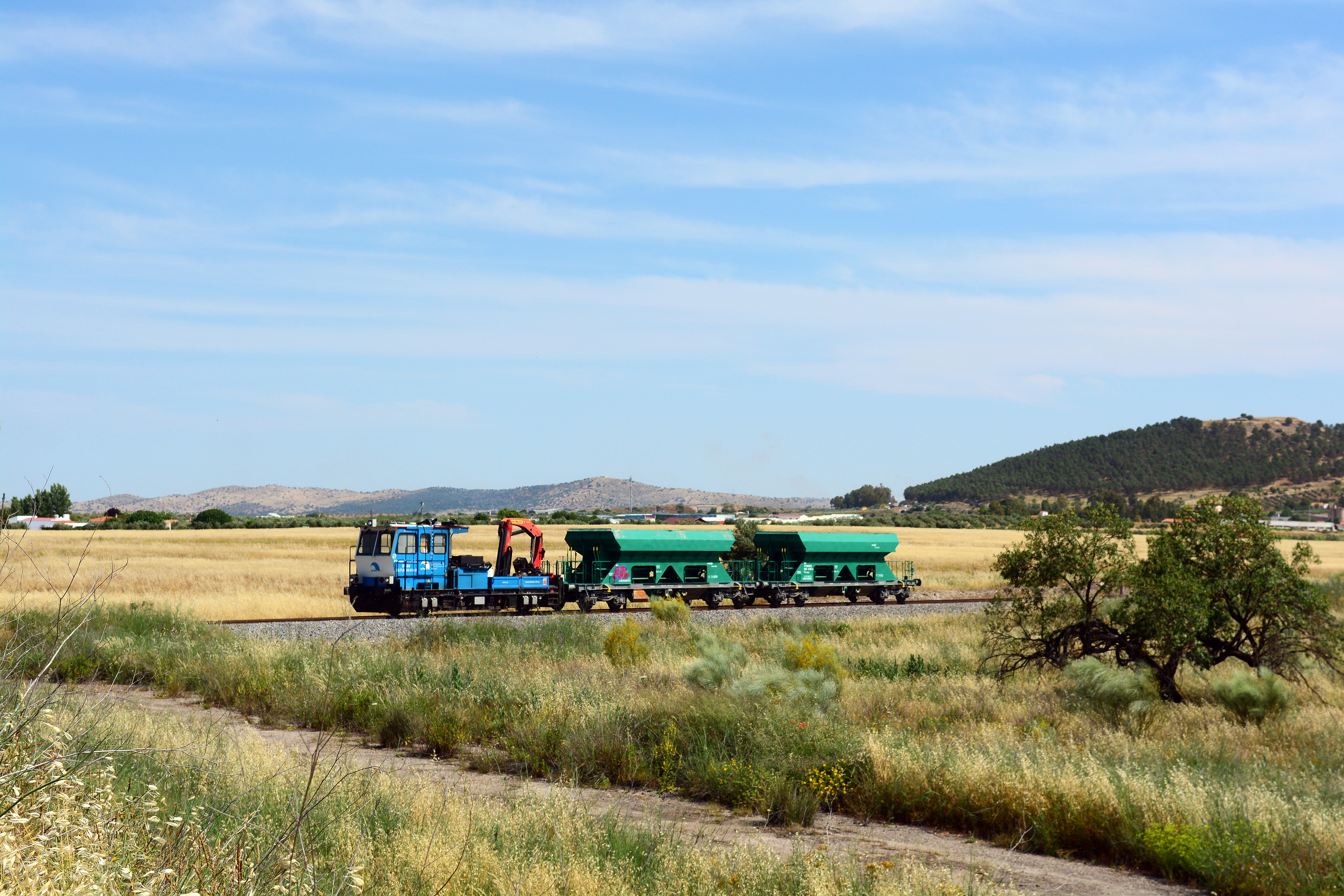
The same infrastructure train, showing the landscape along the line.

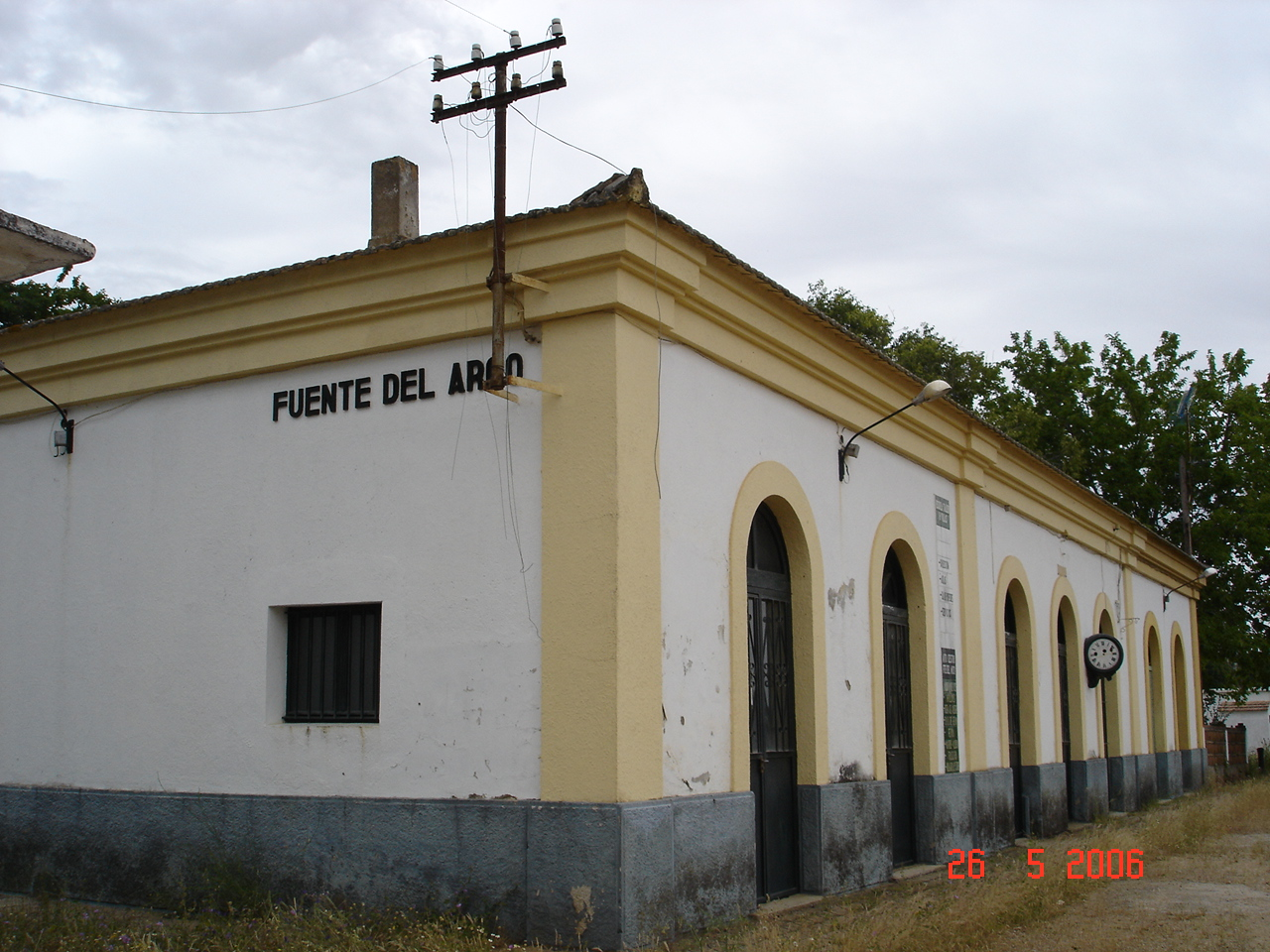
Fuente del Arco railway station.

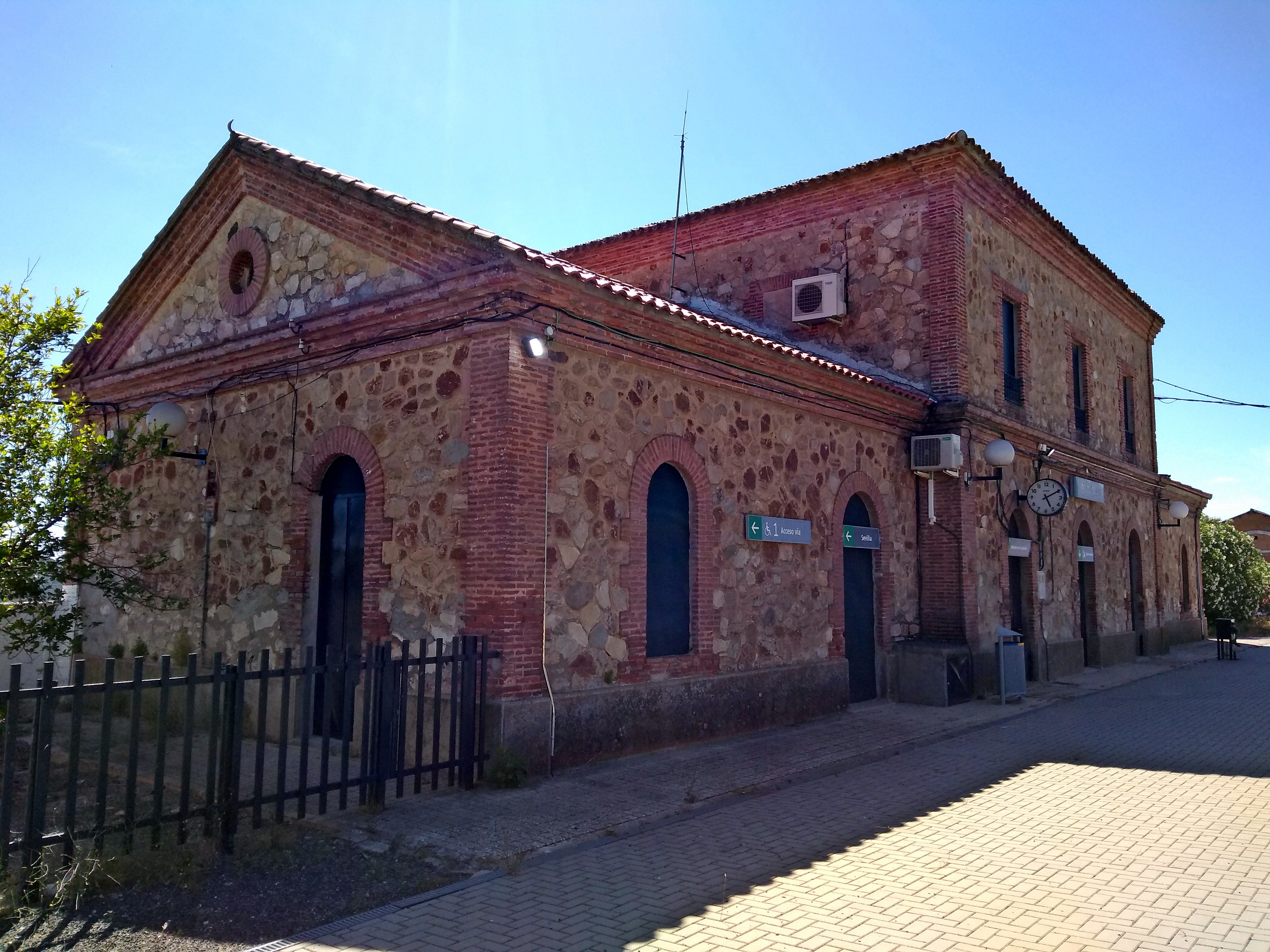
Guadalcanal railway station.

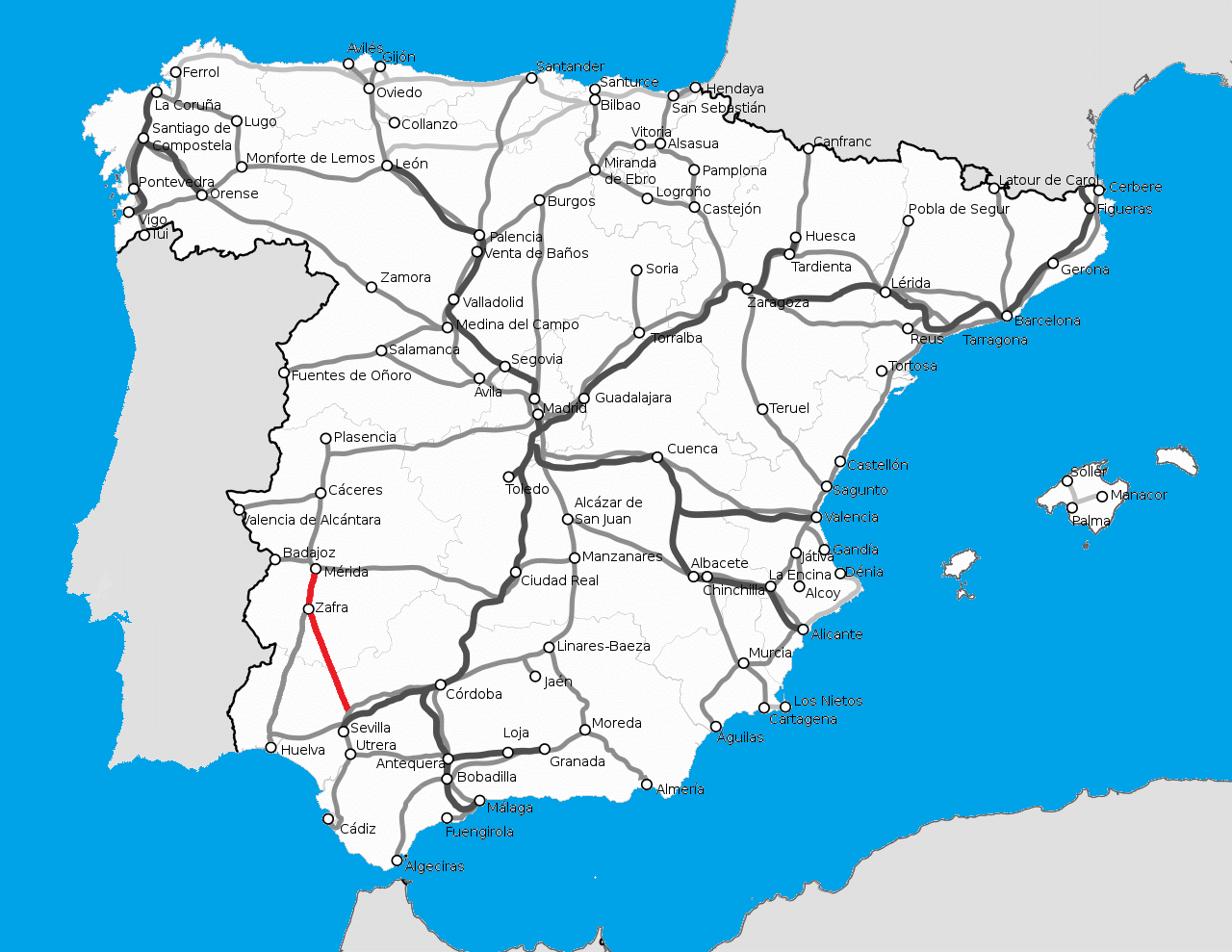
The line seen on a map of the railways of Spain.
