= Bridge of Las Tres Fuentes =

Coordinates: 37°51′55″N 6°50′24″W

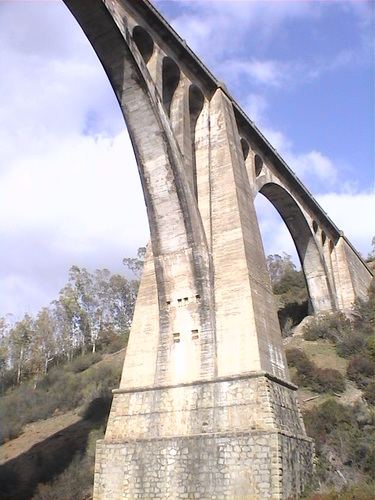
The bridge of Las Tres Fuentes

The Bridge of Las Tres Fuentes (the three fountains) is a bridge pattern by disciples of Gustave Eiffel originally constructed in iron. In the 20th century it was covered with concrete. It is near Gil Marquez, Almonaster la Real.
