= Cáceres railway station =

Cáceres
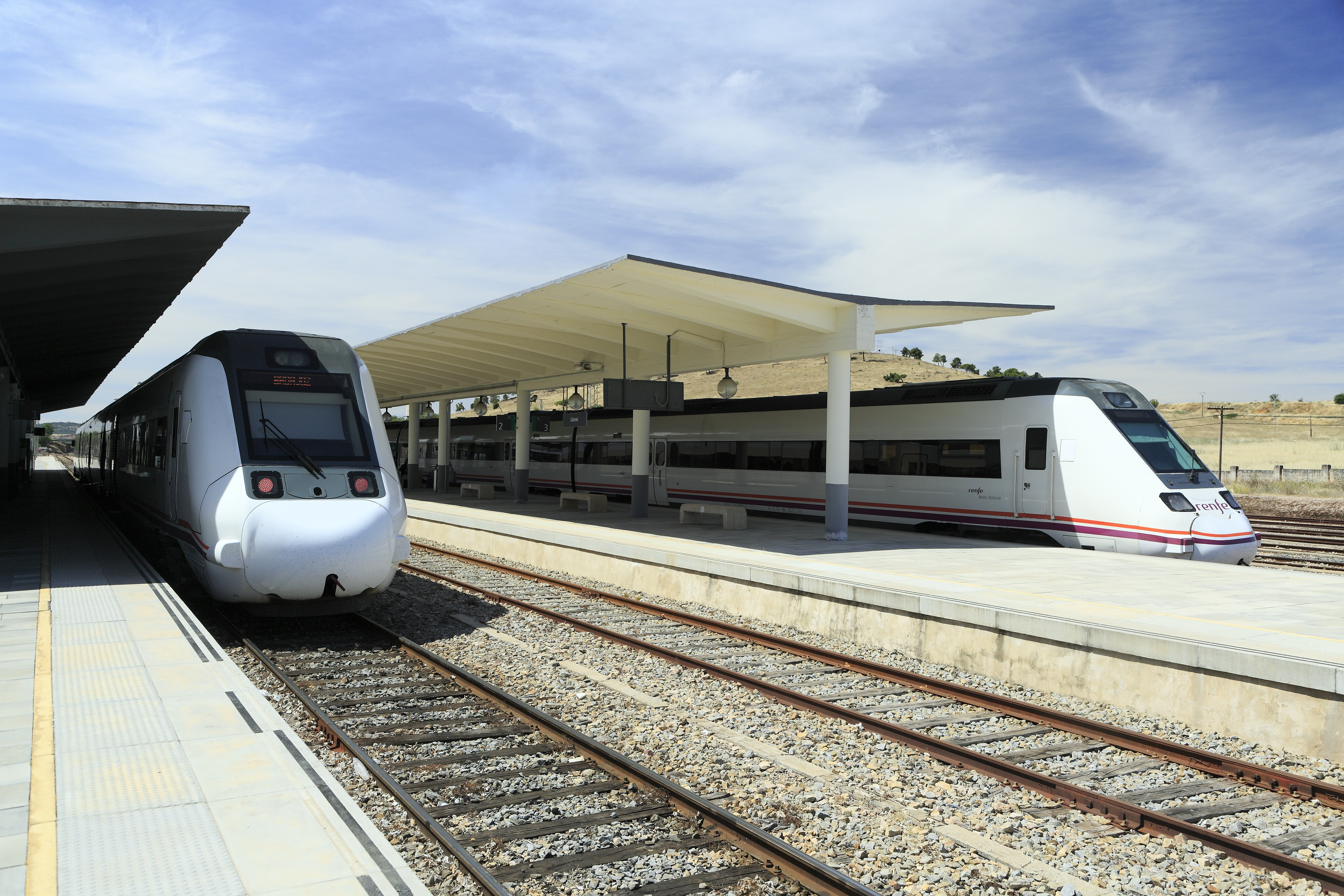

General information
- Coordinates: 39°27′37″N 6°23′8″W
- Owner: adif
- Lines: Madrid–Valencia de Alcántara railway Madrid–Extremadura high-speed rail line (under construction).

History
- Electrified: Under Construction

Passengers
- 2018: 160,584
Location

Cáceres Railway Station is the main railway station of Cáceres, Spain. On the Madrid–Valencia de Alcántara railway, it is 333 kilometres from Madrid and around 115 kilometres from the international border with Portugal. A junction with the Madrid–Extremadura high-speed rail line is also located nearby.

Services that use the station include Media Distancia services to Badajoz, Mérida and Madrid Atocha. Services on line 74 using the Mérida-Los Rosales line mostly terminate here to/from Seville Santa Justa.
