= María Muñoz de Vargas =

Spanish writer, newspaper editor, and poet

- Born: María Luisa Muñoz de Vargas; 5 April 1898; Huelva, Spain
- Died: 31 October 1975 (aged 77); Madrid, Spain
- Citizenship: Spanish
- Occupations: Writer; Newspaper editor; Poet
- Known for: First translator of the work of the Portuguese Fernando Pessoa into Spanish
- Children: José Muñoz Pérez

María Luisa Muñoz de Vargas (5 April 1898 – 31 October 1975) was a Spanish writer, newspaper editor, and poet. She is considered one of the most important figures in the literary and cultural life of Huelva at the beginning of the 20th century.

== Early life and education ==
María Muñoz de Vargas was born in Huelva, on 5 April 1898, as the second daughter of José Muñoz Pérez, a sports journalist who owned the newspaper La Provincia and co-founded Recreativo de Huelva in 1889. As the child of a well-off family, she was sent abroad to study at St. Katherine's School in Walmer, Kent, returning to Spain before the outbreak of the First World War to complete her studies in Barcelona and at the Instituto-Escuela dependent on the Institución Libre de Enseñanza in Madrid.

In 1922, Muñoz de Vargas married Rogelio Buendía, a doctor at the Rio Tinto Company Limited and a poet from Huelva, who introduced her to the literary circles of the time; from then on, she signed her works as María Luisa Muñoz de Buendía.

== Writing career ==
In July 1919, Muñoz de Vargas published his first text, dedicated to the Virgin of El Rocío, in the Revista Hispanoamericana Cervantes. She became the first female regular contributor to the Huelva press, specifically to her father's La Provincia, and her husband's Papel de Aleluyas. This allowed her to publish her first articles under pseudonyms such as Luchy, Luchy Muñoz de Vargas, or the one she used most frequently, Félix de Bulnes. In addition to the family-owned newspaper, she also collaborated with the likes of ABC, Cervantes, Alfar, Semana Santa, and Pictorial Review de New York, where her portrait and articles were published at the age of 18. She was also the first translator of the work of the Portuguese Fernando Pessoa into Spanish, although it was signed by her husband.

Together with Casilda Antón de Olmet, Isabel Tejero, María Rodríguez, and Petra Crespo, Muñoz de Vargas was one of the first women from Huelva to venture into literature, with all of them having managed to overcome the widespread illiteracy that affected the majority of women at the time. She authored a diverse and substantial body of work, including four novels Herrumbre en el alma ("Rust in the Soul"), Toros y palomas ("Bulls and Doves"), El amor no pide permiso ("Love Does Not Ask Permission"), and Tres días de amor ("Three Days of Love"), as well as a collection of children's stories. She also published three poetry books, Bosque sin salida ("Forest Without Exit"), Lluvia en verano ("Rain in Summer"), and La Princesita de la Sal ("The Little Princess of Salt"), and a play titled Destino's Hotel.

Bosque sin salida was prefaced by her friend Juan Ramón Jiménez, and her last poem, published in 1971, was dedicated to him.

== Later life ==
Following the Spanish Civil War, and due to her husband's republican beliefs, Muñoz de Vargas relocated to Madrid where Rogelio was imprisoned; she wrote romance novels and short stories to support herself in the capital.

When his sentence ended, the couple moved to Elche, where he secured a position as a doctor, but she eventually returned to Madrid where, thanks to her education at Kent, she dedicated herself to translating works by English authors.

== Death ==
Muñoz de Vargas died in Madrid on 31 October 1975, at the age of 77.

== Works ==
- Novels
  - Herrumbre en el alma
  - Toros y palomas
  - El amor no pide permiso
  - Tres días de amor
- Poetry books
  - Bosque sin salida
  - Lluvia en verano
  - La Princesita de la Sal
- Play
  - Destino's Hotel
