= Corrales railway station =

Railway station in Andalusia, Spain

Coordinates: 37.2780°N 6.9877°W

Corrales
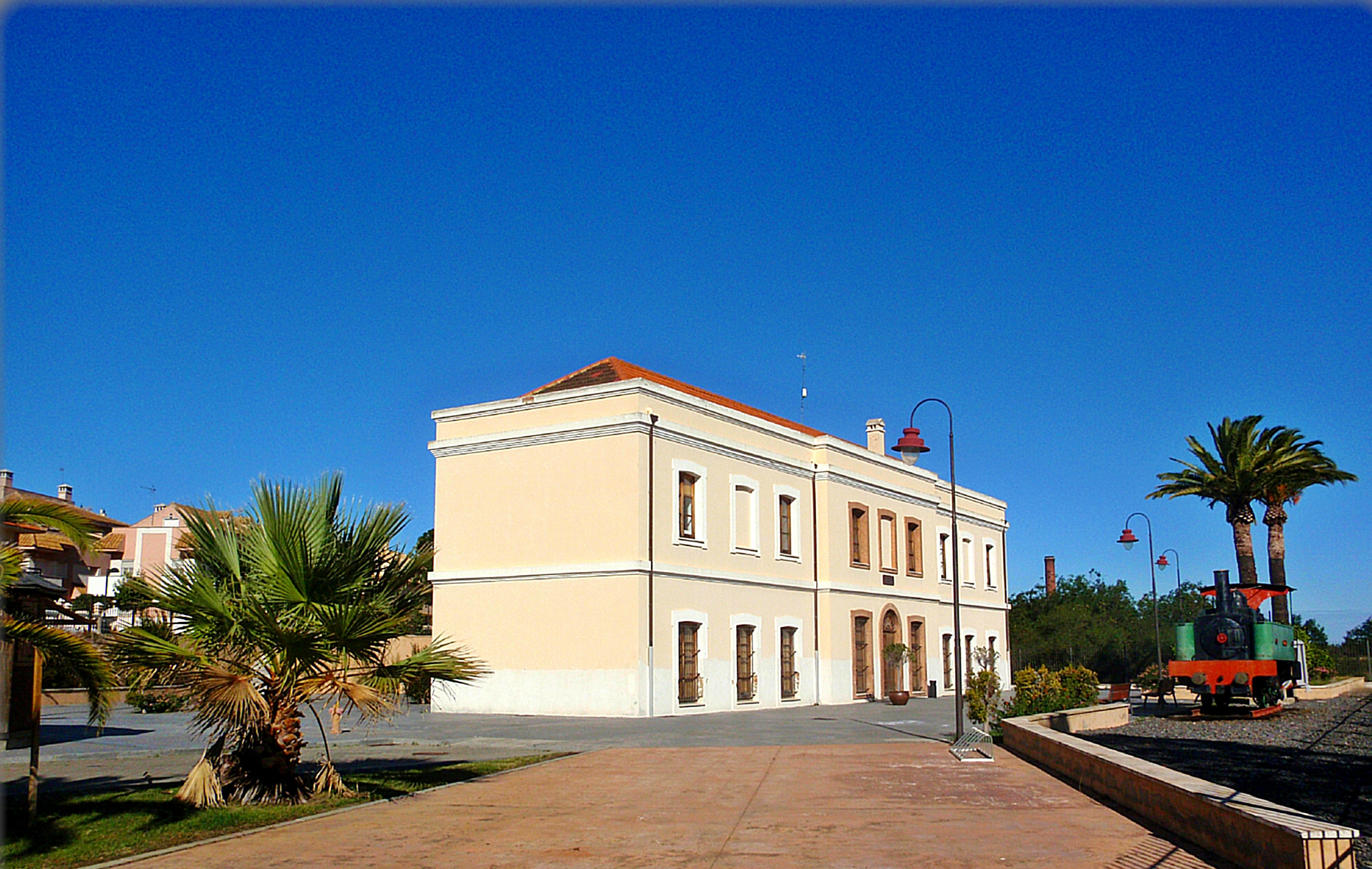
- View of the old station in 2015.

General information
- Location: Aljaraque, Spain
- System: Train station

Other information
- Status: Semi-dismantled

History
- Opened: 1870
Location
Notes
- Part of the Tharsis railway line

Corrales railway station (Spanish: Estación de Corrales) was located in the Spanish municipality of Aljaraque, in the province of Huelva, autonomous community of Andalusia. The facilities were part of the Tharsis railway, a mining-industrial line that was operational between 1871 and 1999.

Throughout its existence, the station served as a railway complex dedicated to the classification of mining trains coming from Tharsis and to serving the mineral installations in the area of Corrales, from which it took its name. Although ore transport was the main activity, for several decades the station also housed passenger services. The facilities remained in service until their closure at the end of 1999. Nowadays, the passenger building has been restored and fulfils other functions, although the rest of the facilities of the complex were dismantled.

== Railway ==
The station was located at kilometre point 44.475 on the Tharsis-Río Odiel narrow-gauge railway line, at an altitude of 7 metres above sea level.

== History ==
The Tharsis railway was inaugurated on 6 February 1871, after several years of construction work. It was built by the Tharsis Sulphur and Copper Company Limited, a British company that owned several mines in the area and was looking for an outlet for the ore extracted by sea. In the Corrales area, an important railway station was built, dedicated to the formation and classification of mining trains. From this complex, the already formed convoys departed to the quay-wharf on the River Odiel. For some decades the station also provided passenger services.

In 1978 the management of the railway infrastructures passed into the hands of the Compañía Española de Minas de Tharsis, which maintained regular operation. In 1981, the state-owned company RENFE provided a link between its Gibraleón-Ayamonte line and the Corrales station by installing a third rail to the original mining railway track. This facilitated the circulation of Iberian gauge trains to the mining-industrial complex. In 1993 the quay-wharf on the Odiel was closed to service, so that from then on the ore began to leave the station by lorry. The rest of the railway line remained in service until its closure on 1 January 2000, although the last train had run on the route a week earlier, on 22 December. The railway was closed on 1 January 2000.

== Facilities ==
Corrales was a marshalling yard, which had a large track yard for the reception and training of mining trains. The installations even had workshops for the maintenance of the "Ruston" model tractors and wagons. In an annexe there was an industrial plant for the treatment and storage of minerals. The railway station was located next to the main line, 400 metres north of the workers' casino, and 250 metres south of the thermal power station.

Over the years, a population centre grew up around the railway complex, where the railway workers, miners and other workers of the Tharsis company lived. The main building of the station consisted of the stationmaster's room, staff office, offices, administration office and telephone switchboard located on the ground floor, as well as the stationmaster's living quarters —located on the first floor with its own vestibule—, dining room, five outbuildings, kitchen and project office. It had a rectangular floor plan with a surface area of 396 square metres and dimensions of 29 metres long by 7 metres wide. Its structure is made up of three attached volumes: a central one, which advances along the façade line, and two lateral ones. After the closure of the railway, between 2002 and 2003 the building underwent a complete restoration by the San José Obrero II Workshop School. It currently houses municipal offices.

== Bibliography ==
- Dávila, José Miguel; Madrona, Antonio (2016). "Las estaciones de ferrocarril de la línea de Tharsis: sistemas constructivos y estructurales". I Congreso Internacional de Patrimonio Industrial y de la Obra Pública: Nuevas estrategias en la gestión del Patrimonio Industrial (in Spanish). pp. 303–313. ISBN 9788461756599.
- Flores Caballero, Manuel (2011). Las fuerzas de la revolución industrial en la fiebre minera del XIX (in Spanish). Editorial Fundación para la investigación Juan Manuel Flores Jimeno.
- Llaudaró, Ferrán (1966). "Los ferrocarriles mineros de la provincia de Huelva" (PDF). Vía Libre (in Spanish) (28). FFE: 21–22. ISSN 1134-1416.
- Sánchez, Francisco (2006). "El ferrocarril Tharsis-Río Odiel". Los ferrocarriles en la provincia de Huelva: Un recorrido por el pasado (in Spanish) (207–227). In: Emilio Romero Macías (dir.). Universidad de Huelva.
