= Pedro Nolasco da Silva =

Pedro Nolasco da Silva CvC
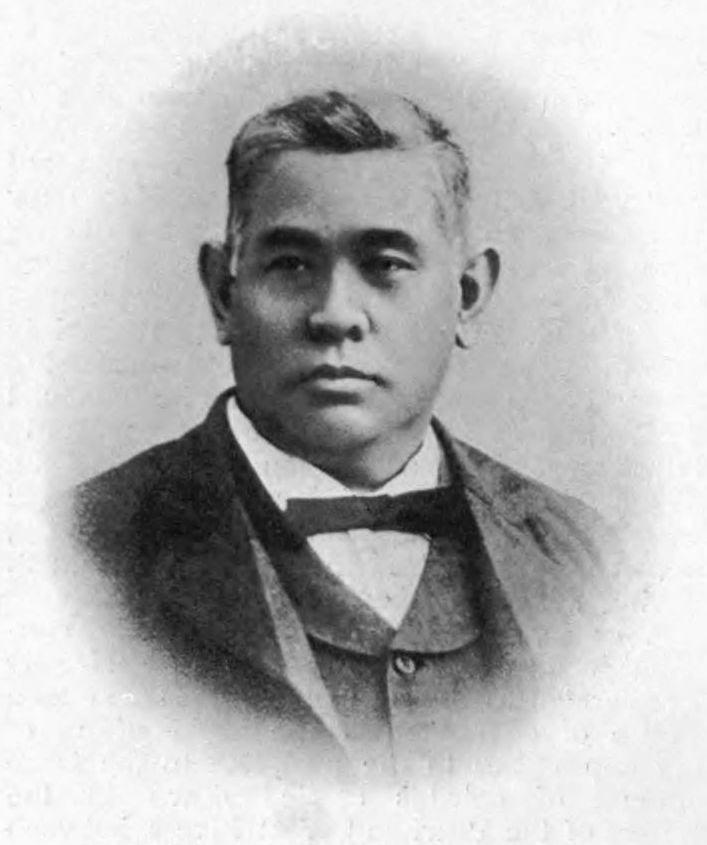
- da Silva in 1908

President of the Municipal Council of Macau

Personal details
- Born: 6 May 1842 Portuguese Macau
- Died: 12 October 1912 (aged 70) Portuguese Macau
- Spouse: Edith Maria Angier (m. 1868)
- Education: St. Joseph's Seminary, São Lourenço, Macau
- Occupation: Writer, translator, teacher, civil servant and politician

Pedro Nolasco da Silva CvC (Chinese: 伯多祿·諾拉斯庫·施利華; 6 May 1842 – 12 October 1912) was a Macanese interpreter-translator, teacher, civil servant, writer, journalist and politician. Amongst other important positions, he was President of the Municipal Council of Macau (Portuguese: Leal Senado; Chinese: 澳門市政廳), founding partner and president of the Association Promoting the Instruction of Macanese (Portuguese: Associação Promotora da Instrução dos Macaenses, APIM), founder and director of the Pedro Nolasco Commercial School (Portuguese: Escola Comercial Pedro Nolasco), head of the Repartição Tecnica de Expediente Sínico de Macau (transl. Chinese Bureau Technical Department (Note: The Portuguese version of the Bureau's name is usually not translated in English language sources)) and patron of the Holy House of Mercy (Portuguese: Santa Casa da Misericórdia; Chinese: 仁慈堂大樓) of Macau.

== Early life and education ==
Of Portuguese nationality and born on 6 May 1842 into a long-established and prominent Macanese family, Nolasco da Silva was the son of Pedro Nolasco da Silva (1803–1874) and Severina Angélica Baptista (1805–1875). His family had lived in Macau as early as the 18th century.

Nolasco da Silva studied at the St. Joseph's Seminary in São Lourenço, Macau. At an early age, he excelled in the subject of philosophy, in which he obtained some school awards. Later, he became a student interpreter at the Administration for Chinese Business (Portuguese: Procuratura dos Negócios Sínicos), where he deepened his knowledge of Chinese language, culture and literature, including Chinese classic texts.

At the age of 24, Nolasco da Silva emigrated to Hong Kong, where he became one of the first correspondents and editors of the newspaper Daily Press. But after catching malaria, and already suffering from diabetes, he decided to return to Macau and the Administration for Chinese Business. On 15 May 1868, after his return, he married Edith Maria Angier, an English woman with whom he had ten children.

== Career ==
In 1885, the Expediente Sínico, which aimed to assist other public agencies in relations with the local Chinese community, became independent from the Administration for Chinese Business. Following this restructuring, Nolasco da Silva was chosen to be the first head of the Expediente Sínico, a position he held until 1892, when he retired from the civil service. This appointment was the result of his brilliant career as an interpreter-translator, marked by the translation of classical Chinese texts into Portuguese, official documents from Portuguese into Chinese and vice versa, and his translation services provided in various official missions abroad. His in-depth knowledge of the Chinese language allowed him to translate and communicate in five different Chinese dialects, including Mandarin and Cantonese

The most important official mission of the Expediente Sínico was in 1887, when Nolasco da Silva, as head of the Expediente Sínico, assisted the Portuguese representative Tomás de Sousa Rosa in the negotiations in Beijing of the Sino-Portuguese Treaty of Peking signed on 1 December 1887, the second article of which stated that "China confirms, in its entirety, article 2 of the Lisbon Protocol, which deals with the perpetual occupation and government of Macau by Portugal".

As well as being an interpreter-translator, Nolasco da Silva was a Chinese teacher at the St. Joseph's Seminary, the Liceu de Macau and the Industrial Institute and editor of the newspapers Echo do Povo (published in Hong Kong), O Macaense and Echo Macaense. Being active in politics and civic associations, he was president of the Municipal Council, inspector of public education, member of the Council of the Province (1892), member of the Court of Auditors (1897), member of the Government Council (1899) and official of the National Battalion. Additionally, he gained some business experience, being a member of the board of the Cement Company of Ilha Verde (1891) and founder of Farmácia Popular (1895).

== Charitable work ==
Nolasco da Silva was also involved in philanthropic associations. He was patron of the Holy House of Mercy, president of the Association of Owners of the Dom Pedro V Theatre, and founder of the Orphans' Asylum (Portuguese: Asilo dos Orfãos).

In 1870, the Government of Portugal decided to expel all foreign teachers from Catholic schools operating in the Portuguese Empire. The decision seriously affected Portuguese education in Macau, as the only Western educational establishment that was functioning well at that time was the St. Joseph's Seminary, where the teachers were mainly foreign Jesuits. Despite protests from the citizens of Macau, the decision was implemented there, and the Seminary was profoundly restructured.

The following year, to minimise this tragedy, a group of 19 rich and influential Portuguese-speaking citizens of Macau, headed by Nolasco da Silva, decided to found the Association Promoting the Instruction of Macanese (APIM), a Portuguese-based private limited company dedicated to the development of local education. One of the initial and main objectives of APIM was to establish an educational establishment, centered on the commerce sector, which would allow Macanese and other Macau residents to occupy important positions in the civil service or in companies in Hong Kong or Shanghai.

After overcoming several difficulties, the much desired educational establishment finally came into operation on 8 January 1878, and was designated the Commercial School (Portuguese: Escola Comercial). Later, in recognition of Nolasco da Silva's great collaboration and effort in its creation, it was renamed the Pedro Nolasco Commercial School, of which he was the first director.

Being a cultured man with vision, Nolasco da Silva also introduced to local Portuguese education the study of the main Neo-Confucian values, understanding of which was fundamental to appreciation of the mentality and behavior of the Chinese, who made up the majority of the population of Macau and its surroundings. As a very religious and devout Catholic, Nolasco da Silva had a great knowledge of philosophy and theology, and was president of the Confraternity of the Immaculate Conception of Macau.

== Personal life ==
With his English wife Edith Maria Angier, Nolasco da Silva had ten children:

- Porfírio Maria Nolasco da Silva (1869–1957)
- João Frederico Nolasco da Silva (1871–1951)
- Edith Maria Constança Nolasco da Silva (1873–?)
- Pedro Nolasco da Silva Jr. (1876–1946)
- José Maria Nolasco da Silva (1878–1960)
- Laura Maria Nolasco da Silva (1880–1968)
- Luís Gonzaga Nolasco da Silva (1881–1954)
- Henrique Maria Nolasco da Silva (1884–1969)
- Maria da Natividade Nolasco da Silva (1886–1914)
- Angelina Maria Emília Nolasco da Silva (1890–?)

He died on 12 October 1912 in Macau, aged 70.

== Honours and awards ==
Before his death, Nolasco da Silva was awarded the honorific title of Knight of the Military Order of Christ (Portuguese: Ordem Militar de Cristo). Shortly after his death, the Municipal Council proclaimed him as an "Honorary Citizen of Macau". To this day, a portrait of him continues to be displayed in the Council's Noble Hall.

Currently, there is at least one public street in Macau named "Rua Pedro Nolasco da Silva". There were also two schools in Macau named after him: Pedro Nolasco da Silva Official Primary School (Portuguese: Escola Primária Oficial Pedro Nolasco da Silva) and Pedro Nolasco Commercial School, both of them now defunct predecessors of the Macau Portuguese School (Portuguese: Escola Portuguesa de Macau (EPM); Chinese: 澳門葡文學校).

== List of works ==
Nolasco da Silva left behind a vast body of written work, including his numerous translations, mostly of works about Chinese language and culture. The following stand out:

- Circle of Knowledge in Portuguese and China. For use by those beginning to learn the Chinese language (Círculo de Conhecimentos em Português e China. Para uso dos que principiam a aprender a língua chinesa) (1884)
- Fables (Fábulas) (1884)
- Usual Phrases of the Canton and Peking Dialects (Frases Usuais dos Dialectos de Cantão e Peking) (1884)
- Practical Grammar of the Chinese Language (Gramática Prática da Língua Chinesa) (1886
- The Rudiments of the Chinese Language for Use by Male Central School Students (Os Rudimentos da Língua Chinesa para Uso dos Alunos da Escola Central do Sexo Masculino) (1895)
- Manual of the Sinic Language, Written and Spoken (Manual da Língua Sínica, Escrita e Falada) (1903)
- To the Public: In Defence of the Association Promoting the Instruction of Macanese attacked by the Bulletin of the Ecclesiastical Government of the Diocese of Macau, by the President of the same Association (Ao Público: Em Defesa da Associação Promotora da Instrução dos Macaenses agredida pelo Boletim do Governo Eclesiástico da Diocese de Macau, pelo Presidente da mesma Associação) (1908)
- Cantonese Dialect Compass (Bússola do Dialecto Cantonense) (1911)
- Book for the Teaching of National Literature (Livro para o Ensino da Literatura Nacional) (1912)

In the Manual of the Sinic Language, Written and Spoken, there is a Portuguese translation by Nolasco da Silva of the Amplification of the Holy Decree, by the Yongzheng Emperor. According to its distinguished translator, this Chinese book "is written in a modern, elegant and clear style, [and] contains an interesting and instructive outline of the principles of Chinese morals".
