= Aljaraque =

- Flag Coat of arms
- Interactive map of Aljaraque
- Location in Spain
- Coordinates: 37°16′N 7°01′W
- Municipality: Huelva

Government
  - Mayor: David Toscano

Area
  - Total: 34 km^{2} (13 sq mi)
  - Land: 34 km^{2} (13 sq mi)
  - Water: 0.00 km^{2} (0 sq mi)

Population (2025-01-01)
  - Total: 22,737
  - Density: 670/km^{2} (1,700/sq mi)
- Time zone: UTC+1 (CET)
  - Summer (DST): UTC+2 (CEST)
- Website: ayto-aljaraque.es

Aljaraque is a city located in the province of Huelva, Spain. According to the 2025 municipal register, the city has a population of 22,737 inhabitants. In ancient times it was referred to as "Kalathousa" (Ancient Greek: Καλάθουσα) by the Greeks.

== Demographics ==
Aljaraque has received a steady influx of new settlers in the past few years, due to the property price increase in Huelva, and the urban area's quality of life.

Historical population
Year	Pop.	±%
1999	10,298	—
2000	10,806	+4.9%
2001	11,626	+7.6%
2002	12,303	+5.8%
2003	13,009	+5.7%
2004	14,060	+8.1%
2005	14,846	+5.6%
Source: INE (Spain)

== Districts ==
Aljaraque contains the districts of Corrales, Bellavista, Dehesa Golf, and La Monacilla, most areas of which are urbanized.

== Main sights ==
- Church of Nuestra Señora de Los Remedios
- Hermitage of Nuestra Señora de Los Remedios
- Church of Nuestra Señora Reina del Mundo
- Church of Nuestra Señora de Bellavista
- Hermitage of San Sebastián
- Archaeological site of Papa Uvas

== Gallery ==
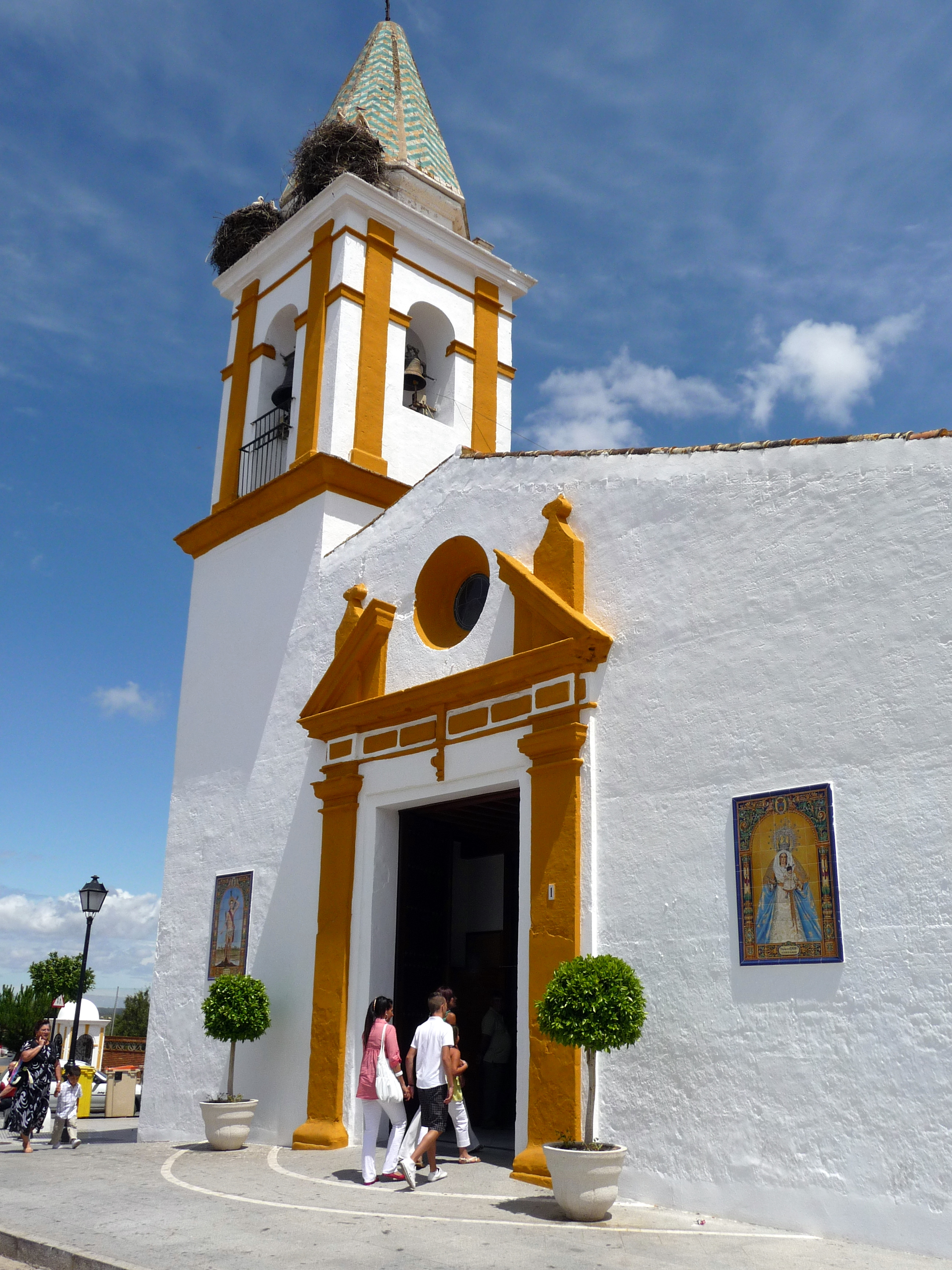
Church of Nuestra Señora de Los Remedios

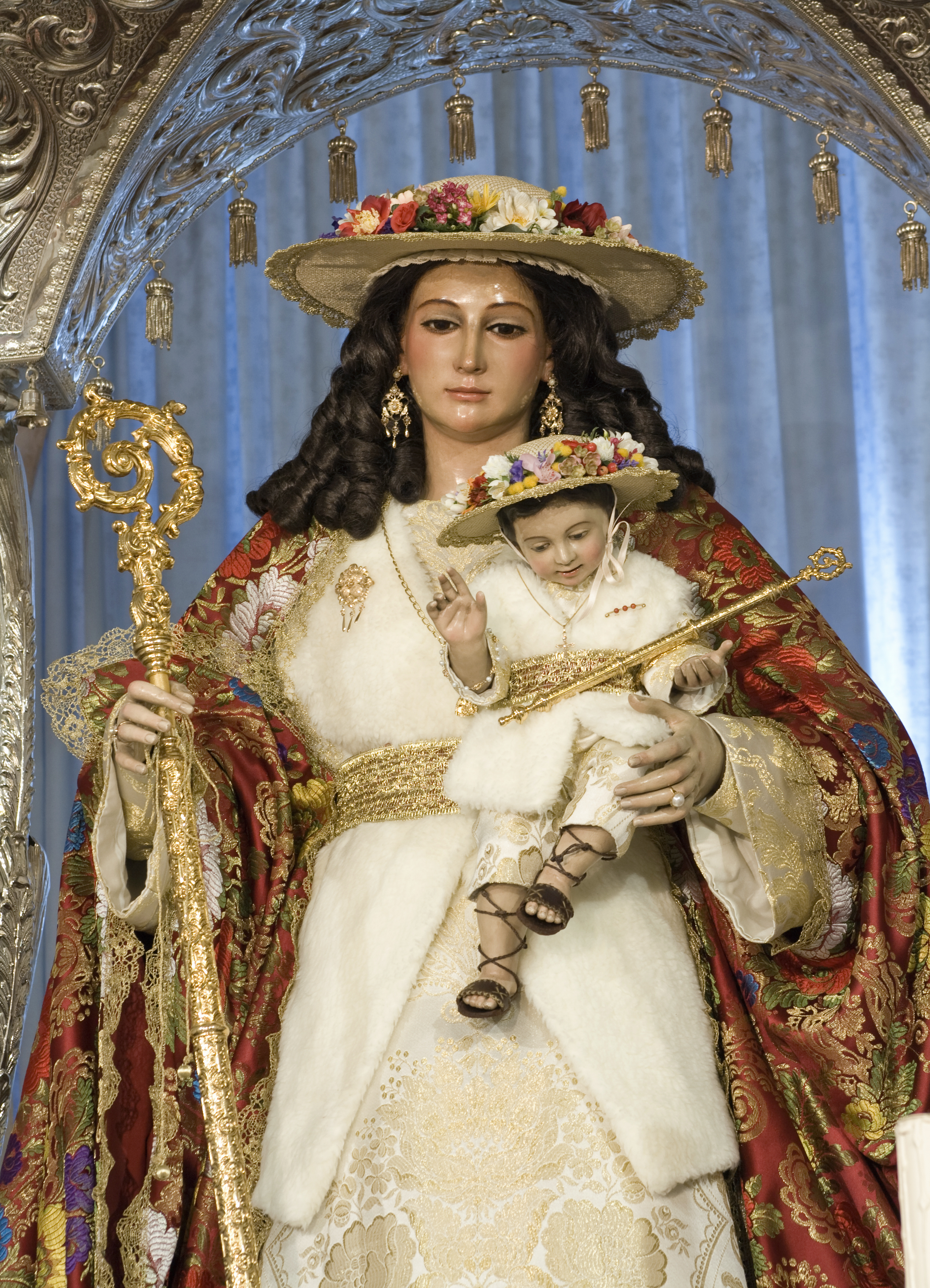
Nuestra Señora de Los Remedios (Our Lady of Remedies) - Aljaraque's Patron

== See also ==
- Corrales railway station
- List of municipalities of Spain
- List of municipalities in Huelva
