= Guillermo Sundheim =

German entrepreneur and businessman (1840-1903)

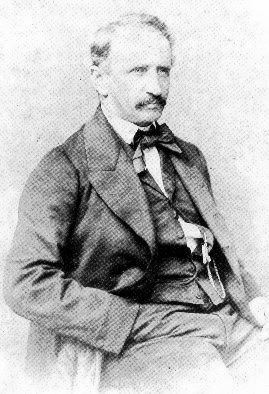
- Guillermo Sundheim
- Born: Wilhelm Sundheim-Giese; 3 July 1840; Giessen, Hesse, Germany
- Died: 7 August 1903 (aged 63); Huelva, Spain
- Citizenship: German
- Occupations: Entrepreneur; Businessman
- Known for: German consul in Huelva

Wilhelm Sundheim-Giese, better known as Guillermo Sundheim (3 July 1840 – 7 August 1903), was a German entrepreneur and businessman, who is widely regarded as one of the most important figures of Huelva at the end of the 19th century, being responsible for part of the development and economic growth of the province, especially in the financial, mining, and railway fields. He is considered the paradigm of the foreign bourgeoisie that settled in Huelva during the years of industrial expansion. He also served for several years as German consul in Huelva.

== Early and personal life ==
Wilhelm Sundheim-Giese was born in the German town of Giessen, north of Frankfurt, on 3 July 1840, (Note: Some sources wrongly state that he was born on 3 April 1840.) as the son of Johann Carl Sundheim and Juana Mª Gertrudis Giese und Giese, from the Grand Duchy of Hesse-Darmstatt. Aware of the great industrial potential of the Huelva area, such as mining and tourism, he decided to move and settle there in 1864, aged 24, together with his fellow German Heinrich Doetsch, with whom he founded the trading company Sundheim & Doetsch in 1865, which would become the main financial support for Sundheim in terms of his economic initiatives.

On 8 March 1866, in Huelva, Sundheim married Justa de la Cueva y Camporredondo, daughter of the wealthy landowner Fernando de la Cueva y Cáceres, who was Mayor of Huelva in 1865 and 1872, and the couple had four children, including Guillermo Sundheim born in 1866.

== Entrepreneuring career ==
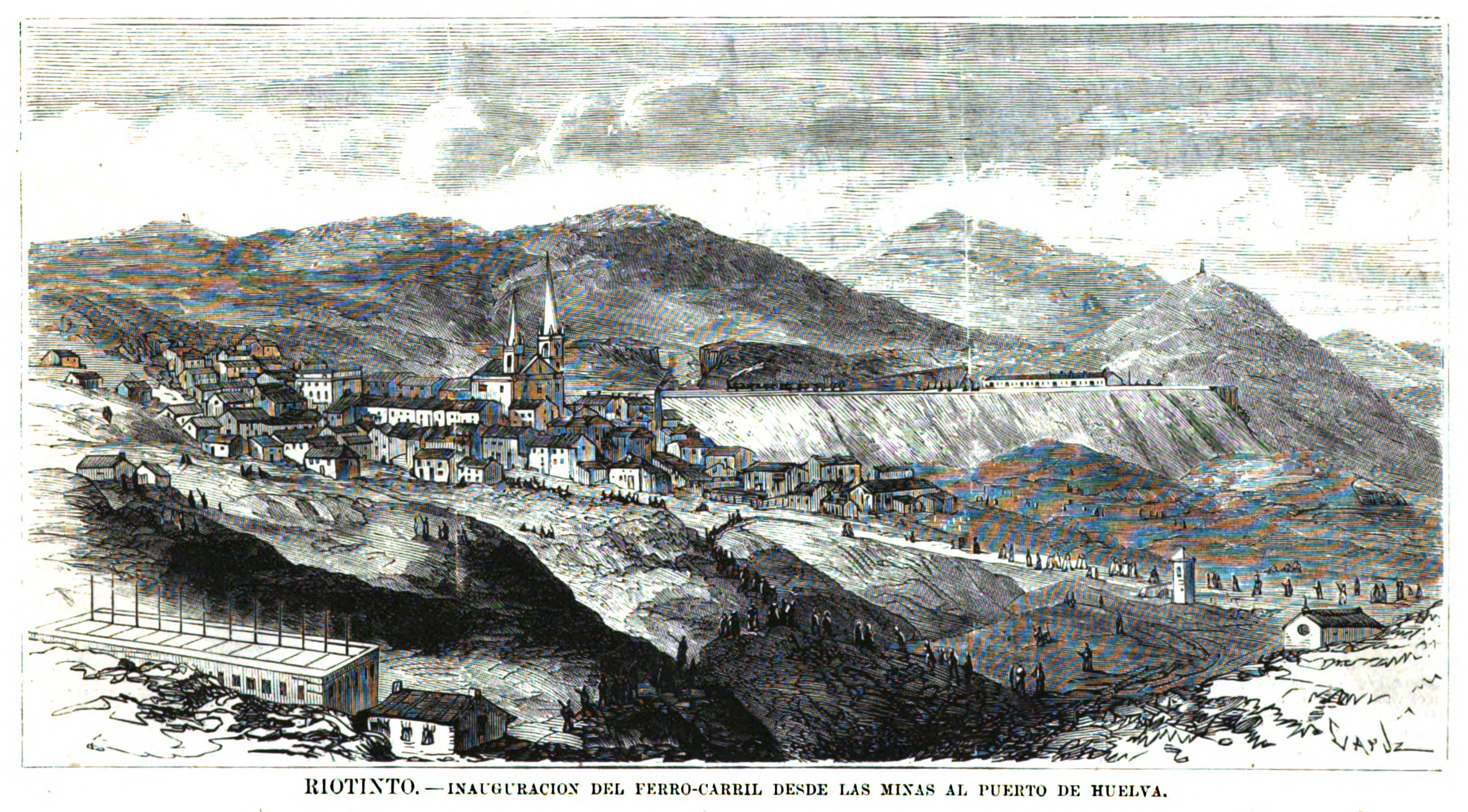
"Riotinto - Inauguration of the railway from the mines to the port of Huelva" - La Ilustración Española y Americana. 15 August 1875.

The alliances he established with foreign businessmen, including Englishmen, allowed Sundheim to serve as an intermediary with foreign bankers for the purchase of the Riotinto Mines from the Spanish state in 1872–73. In fact, it was he who convinced the director of the London bank, Hugn Matheson, to make large investments in the province of Huelva and purchase those mines, which resulted in the foundation of Rio Tinto Company Limited (RTCL), of which he was a member. His relationship with this company, as its representative in Spain and Portugal, was fruitful until 1876, when he lost the trust of the management.

The Sundheim & Doetsch had a very diversified business portfolio, including modernizing the Port of Huelva and developing the railroad, such as obtaining the concession and was the promoter of the construction of the city's railway stations (Zafra and Seville Stations) as well as the railway lines from Huelva to Seville and from Huelva to Zafra, with the Riotinto Railway being officially inaugurated on 28 July 1875. Doetsch was succeeded at the Rio Tinto Group by his nephew Carlos Doetsch (1870–1951), who married in 1902 Justita Sundheim de la Cueva, daughter of Guillermo, and the couple had two children, Mercedes and Jorge.

Sundheim set an example of how to take advantage of other natural resources throughout the Huelva region, producing exquisite wines, exploiting magnificent white marble quarries, establishing the breeding and fattening of pigs, and making considerable shipments to England of the famous chestnut from the Sierra. He made countless business activities and achievements, and held several positions and properties, most notably being the owner of wineries and vineyards in Peguerillas, and also had marble quarries in Fuenteheridos.

== Social and sporting career ==
In addition to his industrial and entrepreneurial projects, Sundheim also contributed to the life of the city with his cultural and social activities, founding the first sailing club in Huelva in 1875, and being a founding member of the Real Sociedad Colombina Onubense in 1880 and its president. He also promoted and fostered knowledge of the then semi-abandoned surroundings of the La Rábida Friary.

Sundheim was the owner of the first chalet built in Punta Umbría, and in the early 1880s, he was one of the promoters, together with Matheson and Doetsch of the RTCL, of the construction of Hotel Colón, a luxury hotel meant not only to accommodate the growing number of English and German businessmen and senior executives of the various companies operating in the mining basin of Rio Tinto, but also to provide an infrastructure in Huelva capable of hosting the events celebrating of the fourth Centenary of the Discovery of America, hence its name. On behalf of Sundheim, the architect José Pérez Santamaría built Hotel Colón between 1881 and 1883 on a space of 20,000 square meters, becoming the most luxurious in Spain when it was inaugurated on 26 June.

At the end of the 19th century, the walls of Hotel Colón experienced two of the most important events in Huelva, such as the foundation of the Huelva Recreation Club in December 1889, the very first football club in Spain, and the aforementioned IV Centenary of the Discovery of America in 1892, of which he was one of the organizers. Recreativo's founding meeting on 23 December 1889, was called by Dr. William Alexander Mackay, in agreement with Sundheim, who later selflessly gave up land for the club to play tennis; this was the first tennis court in the city of Huelva, located in the old Hotel Colón. The club's first address was the home of Huelva's secretary Edward Palin, and it remained so until the club achieved its own premises in the following month, on 25 January 1890, thanks to the transfer by Sundheim of rooms No. 38 and No. 39 of the East Pavilion of the Hotel Colón, where the Municipal Archive of Huelva is today located.

During the so-called Centenary Season, which took place between 3 August and 12 October 1892, Hotel Colón accommodated several important Spanish personalities, such as the Prime Minister of Spain Antonio Cánovas del Castillo and representatives of the invited Ibero-American nations. This hotel later became the property of the RTCL as it was not viable for Sundheim, whose name was given to the old road to Seville, a great avenue leading into the city and which ends at where Hotel Colón was built.

== Later life and death ==
Sundheim was named an adopted son of Huelva in 1879, living the rest of his life in a chalet next to Casa Colón, on the avenue that now bears his name since 1892.

Sundheim died in Huelva on 7 August 1903, at the age of 63. Curiously, in the same year that he died, Otto Engelhardt was appointed consul in Seville, another German who went on to become an adopted son of an Andalusian city.

== Legacy ==
In 2023, Huelva's Councillor for Tourism, Francisco Baluffo, presented an informative brochure at the Berlin Tourism Fair (ITB), in which he stated "Many of the identity elements [of Huelva] that we know and treasure today as some of our main values are because Sundheim decided to give the necessary push to turn them into what we know today".

== Bibliography ==
- Peña Guerrero, María Antonia (2006). Guillermo Sundheim y el ferrocarril, un modelo de inversor extranjero en el sector ferroviario español. At: Emilio Romero Macías (dir.). Universidad de Huelva. pp. 51–77. ISBN 9788416061730.
