= Almonaster la Real =

- Town and Municipality
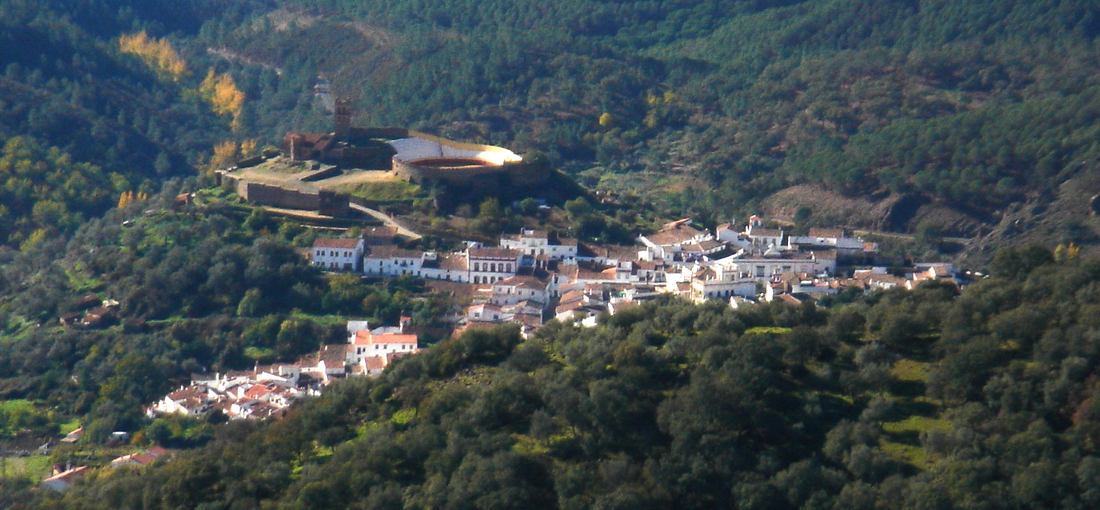

- Flag Coat of arms

- Location in Spain Almonaster la Real (Andalusia) Almonaster la Real (Spain)
- Coordinates: 37°52′24″N 6°47′10″W
- Country: Spain
- Region: Andalusia
- Province: Huelva
- Municipality: Almonaster la Real

Government
  - Mayor: Jacinto José Vázquez López (PSOE-A)

Area
  - Total: 322 km^{2} (124 sq mi)
  - Land: 322 km^{2} (124 sq mi)
  - Water: 0.00 km^{2} (0 sq mi)

Population (2025-01-01)
  - Total: 1,759
  - Density: 5.46/km^{2} (14.1/sq mi)
- Time zone: UTC+1 (CET)
  - Summer (DST): UTC+2 (CEST)
- Website: www.almonasterlareal.es

Almonaster la Real is a town and municipality located in the province of Huelva, Spain. According to the 2025 municipal register, the city has a population of 1,759 inhabitants.

== Demographics ==
Historical population
Year	Pop.	±%
1999	2,011	—
2000	1,963	−2.4%
2001	1,938	−1.3%
2002	1,898	−2.1%
2003	1,879	−1.0%
2004	1,858	−1.1%
2005	1,805	−2.9%
Source: INE (Spain)

== Monuments ==
=== Mosque, 9th-10th century ===
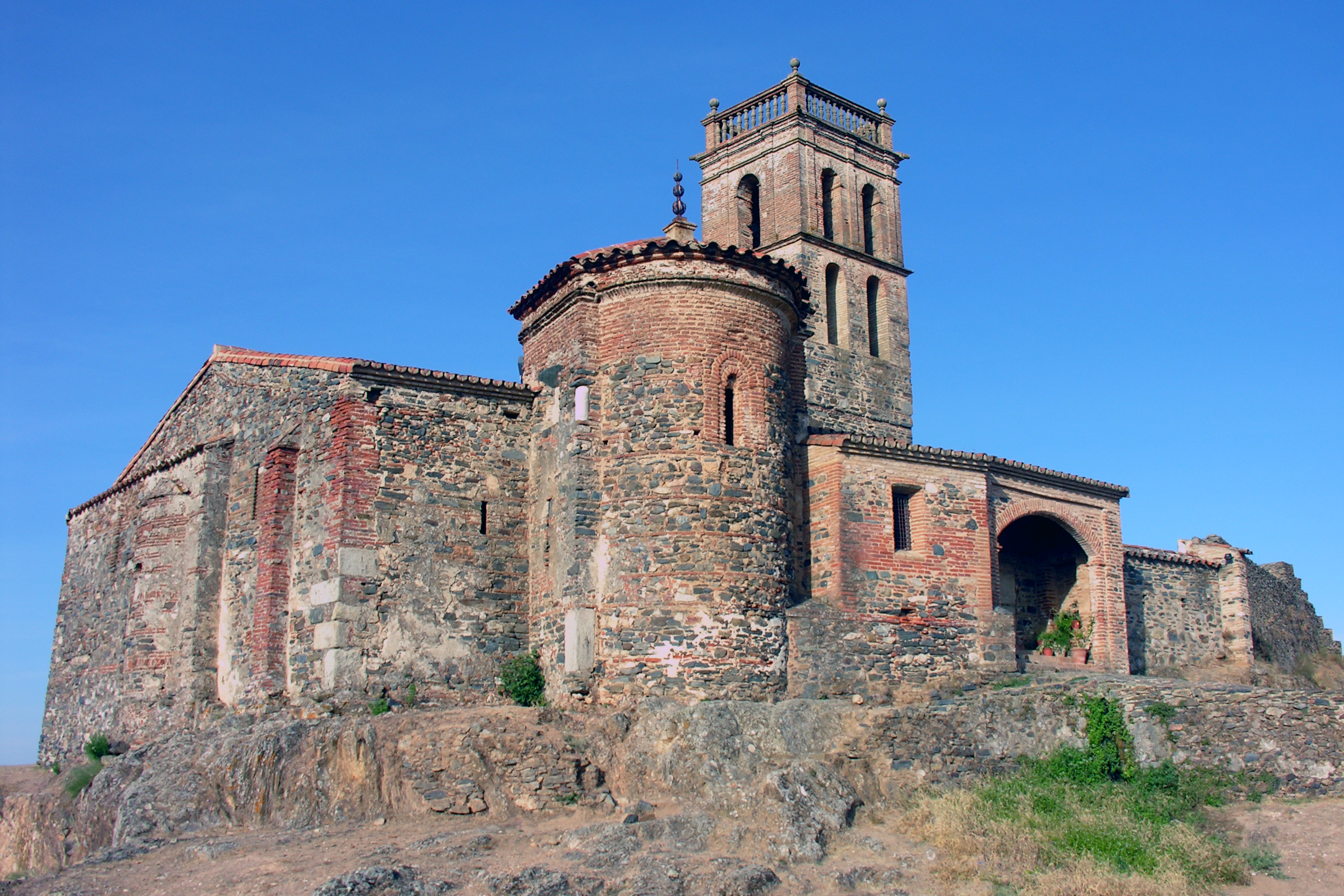
The Mezquita

As the Arab name Al-Munastir suggests, the Mosque was built on the site of a Christian monastery and incorporates some of the fabric of a visigothic basilica. It is one of the few surviving Spanish rural mosques of Umayyad date (10th century, possibly 9th).

It is an oddly-shaped building, made of brick and stone in a trapezoidal shape, probably because of the hilly terrain.

The prayer hall consists of a central nave and aisles divided by brick arcades, resting on rectangular stone pillars or reused Roman columns, with at least one re-employed Roman Corinthian capital. The central nave is wider than the two adjacent aisles, which are in turn wider than the outer aisles. The brick Mihrab projects into the southern flank. A small courtyard was cut out of the rock in the north-east corner, and contains a stone basin that was once used for ritual ablutions. The detached rectangular minaret on the north side has been converted into a bell tower. The eastern apse and sacristy and western porch were also added when the building was turned into a church. Sixteen undated graves were found under the floor.

What little light it would have had would have come in via the patio, the door and three narrow windows, two to the left of the Mihrab and two to the right.

== See also ==
- Tharsis-La Zarza mining basin
- List of municipalities in Huelva
