= List of birds of Spain =

This is a list of the bird species recorded in Spain. The area covered by this list is mainland Spain, the Balearic Islands, the Canary Islands, and three small Spanish enclaves on the North African shore. The avifauna of Spain included a total of 638 species recorded in the wild by 2022 according to Sociedad Española de Ornitología (SEO/BirdLife). Taxonomy follows the IOC World Bird List.

The following tags have been used to highlight some categories of occurrence.

- (R) Rarity – a species that only occurs rarely anywhere in Spain, and requires submission of evidence to the Comité de Rarezas de SEO (Spanish Rarities Committee) for acceptance.
- (E) Endemic – a species found only in Spain, with the location appended.
- (B) Category B - species which have not been recorded in Spain since 1950.
- (C) Category C - species introduced to Spain as a consequence, direct or indirect, of human actions and that has an established population.

Note that Category D (species for which there are reasonable doubts as to their wild origin) do not form part of the Spanish list, and are not included here.

An additional note such as (Canary Islands only) means that the species has been recorded solely in that locality. Species without a note of that type have been recorded at a minimum in mainland Spain.

== Ducks, geese, and waterfowl ==
Order: Anseriformes Family: Anatidae

Anatidae includes the ducks and most duck-like waterfowl, such as geese and swans. These birds are adapted to an aquatic existence with webbed feet, flattened bills, and feathers that are excellent at shedding water due to an oily coating.

- Brent goose (barnacla carinegra), Branta bernicla
- Red-breasted goose (barnacla cuellirroja), Branta ruficollis (R)
- Barnacle goose (barnacla cariblanca), Branta leucopsis (R)
- Canada goose (barnacla canadiense grande), Branta canadensis (C)
- Bar-headed goose (ánsar indio), Anser indicus (C)
- Snow goose (ánsar nival), Anser caerulescens (R)
- Greylag goose (ánsar común), Anser anser
- Taiga bean goose (ánsar campestre), Anser fabalis (R)
- Pink-footed goose (ánsar piquicorto), Anser brachyrhynchus
- Tundra bean goose (ánsar de la tundra), Anser serrirostris (R)
- Greater white-fronted goose (ánsar careto), Anser albifrons
- Mute swan (cisne vulgar), Cygnus olor
- Black swan (cisne negro), Cygnus atratus (C)
- Bewick's swan (cisne chico), Cygnus columbianus (R)
- Whooper swan (cisne cantor), Cygnus cygnus (R)
- Egyptian goose (ganso del Nilo), Alopochen aegyptiaca (C)
- Common shelduck (tarro blanco), Tadorna tadorna
- Ruddy shelduck (tarro canelo), Tadorna ferruginea
- Muscovy duck (pato criollo), Cairina moschata (C)
- Mandarin duck (pato mandarín), Aix galericulata (C)
- Garganey (cerceta carretona), Spatula querquedula
- Blue-winged teal (cerceta aliazul), Spatula discors (R)
- Northern shoveler (cuchara común), Spatula clypeata
- Gadwall (ánade friso), Mareca strepera
- Eurasian wigeon (silbón europeo), Mareca penelope
- American wigeon (silbón americano), Mareca americana (R)
- Mallard (ánade azulón), Anas platyrhynchos
- American black duck (ánade sombrío), Anas rubripes (R)
- Northern pintail (ánade rabudo), Anas acuta
- Eurasian teal (cerceta común), Anas crecca
- Green-winged teal (cerceta americana), Anas carolinensis (R)
- Marbled duck (cerceta pardilla), Marmaronetta angustirostris
- Red-crested pochard (pato colorado), Netta rufina
- Common pochard (porrón europeo), Aythya ferina
- Ferruginous duck (porrón pardo), Aythya nyroca
- Ring-necked duck (porrón acollarado), Aythya collaris
- Tufted duck (porrón moñudo), Aythya fuligula
- Greater scaup (porrón bastardo), Aythya marila
- Lesser scaup (porrón bola), Aythya affinis (R)
- King eider (éider real), Somateria spectabilis (R)
- Common eider (éider común), Somateria mollissima
- Surf scoter (negrón careto), Melanitta perspicillata (R)
- Velvet scoter (negrón especulado), Melanitta fusca
- Stejneger's scoter (negrón siberiano), Melanitta stejnegeri (R)
- Common scoter (negrón común), Melanitta nigra
- Black scoter (negrón americano), Melanitta americana (R)
- Long-tailed duck (pato havelda), Clangula hyemalis
- Bufflehead (porrón albeola), Bucephala albeola (R)
- Common goldeneye (porrón osculado), Bucephala clangula (R)
- Barrow's goldeneye (porrón islándico), Bucephala islandica (R)
- Smew (serreta chica), Mergellus albellus (R)
- Goosander (serreta grande), Mergus merganser (R)
- Red-breasted merganser (serreta mediana), Mergus serrator
- Ruddy duck (malvasía canela), Oxyura jamaicensis (C)
- White-headed duck (malvasía cabeciblanca), Oxyura leucocephala
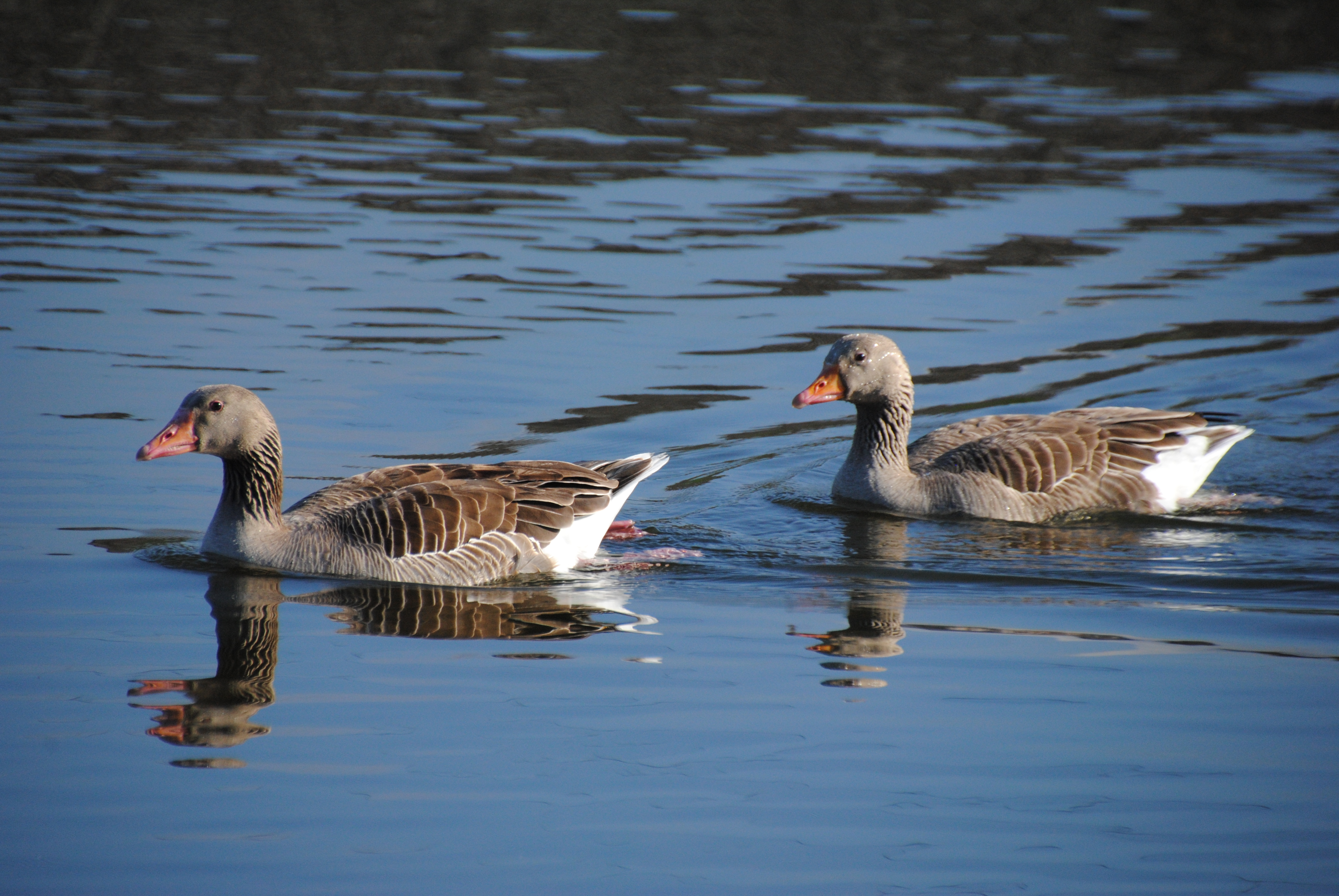
Greylag geese, Tablas de Daimiel National Park, Ciudad Real

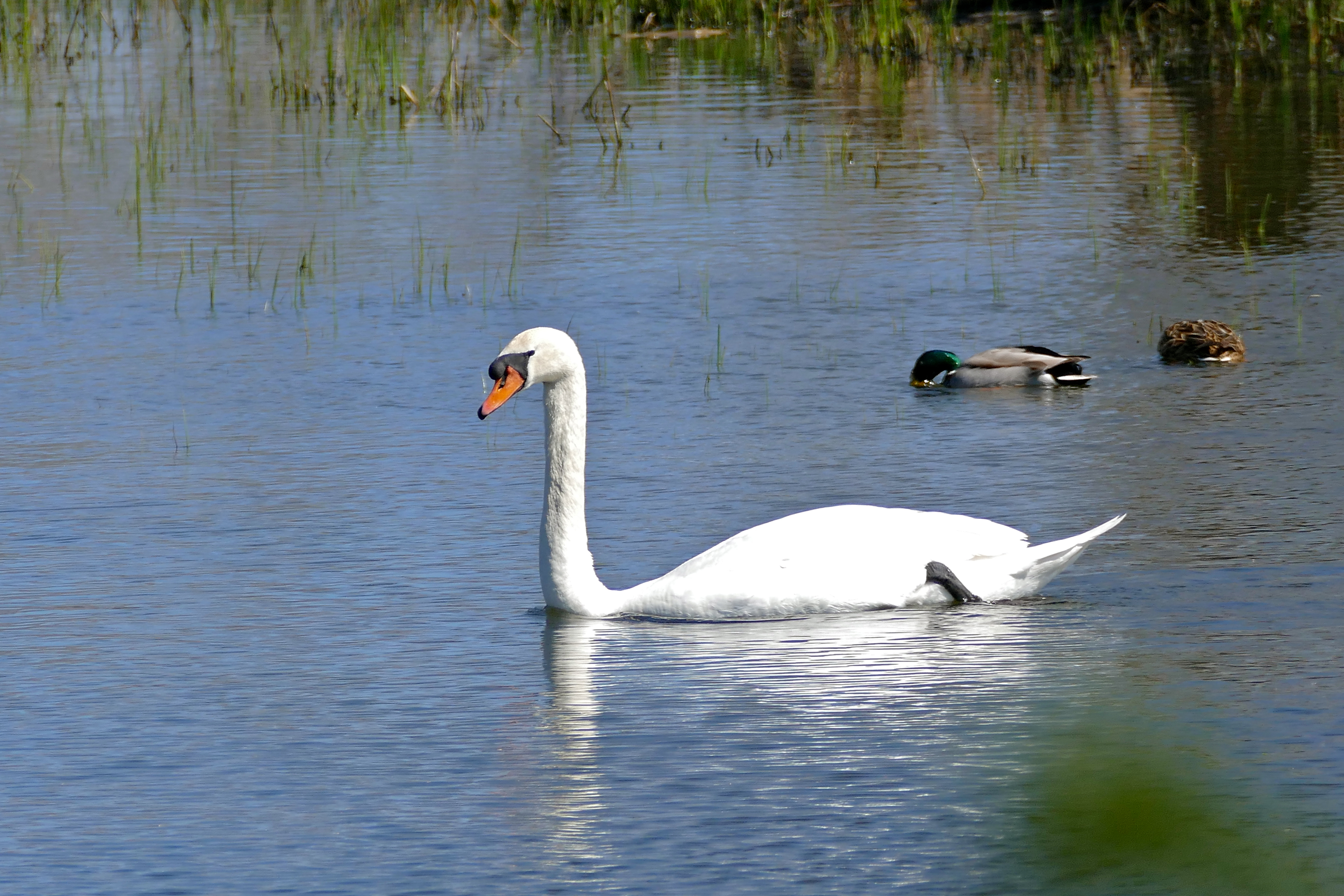
Mute swan, with mallards, Castelló d'Empúries, Catalonia

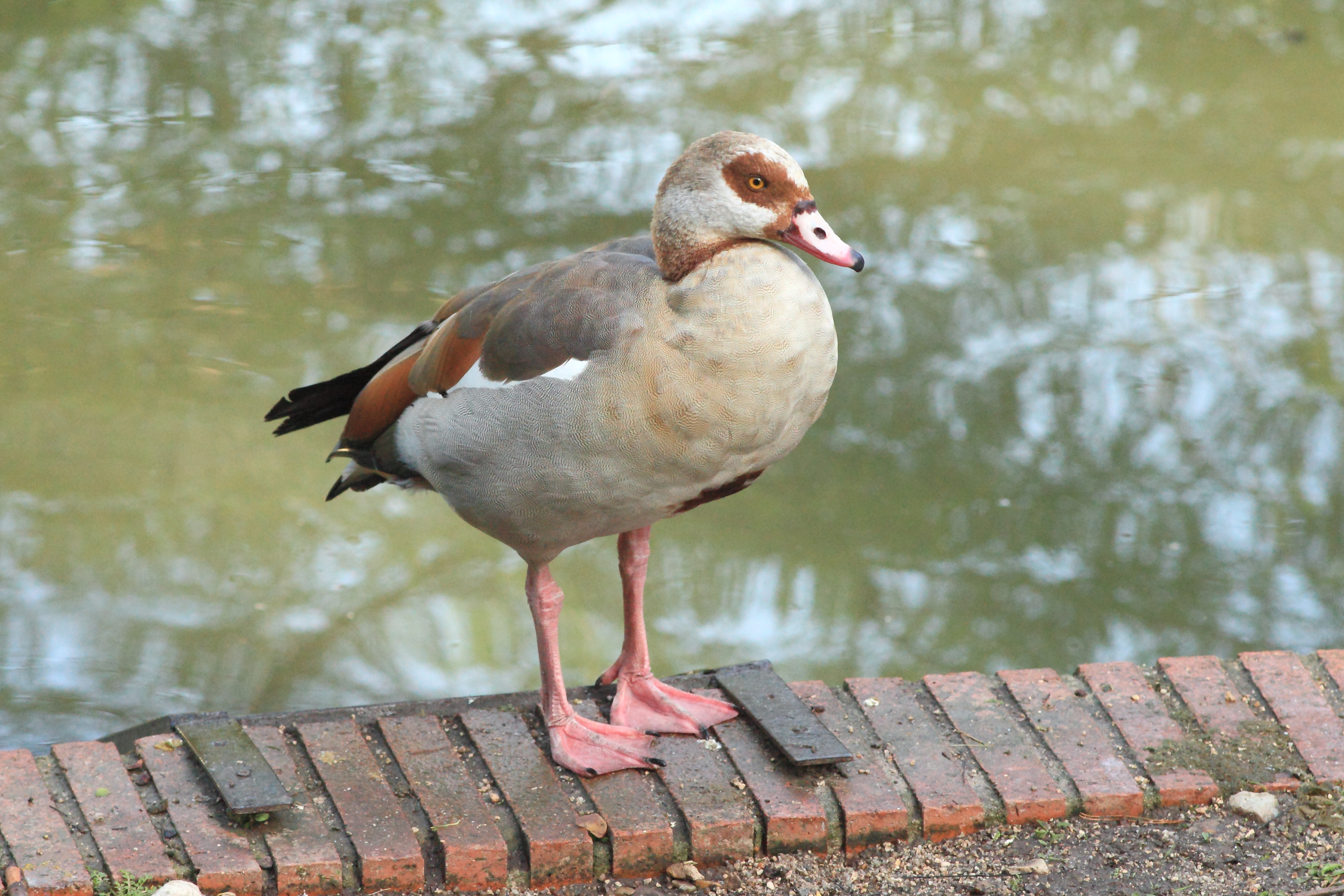
Egyptian goose, Retiro Park, Madrid

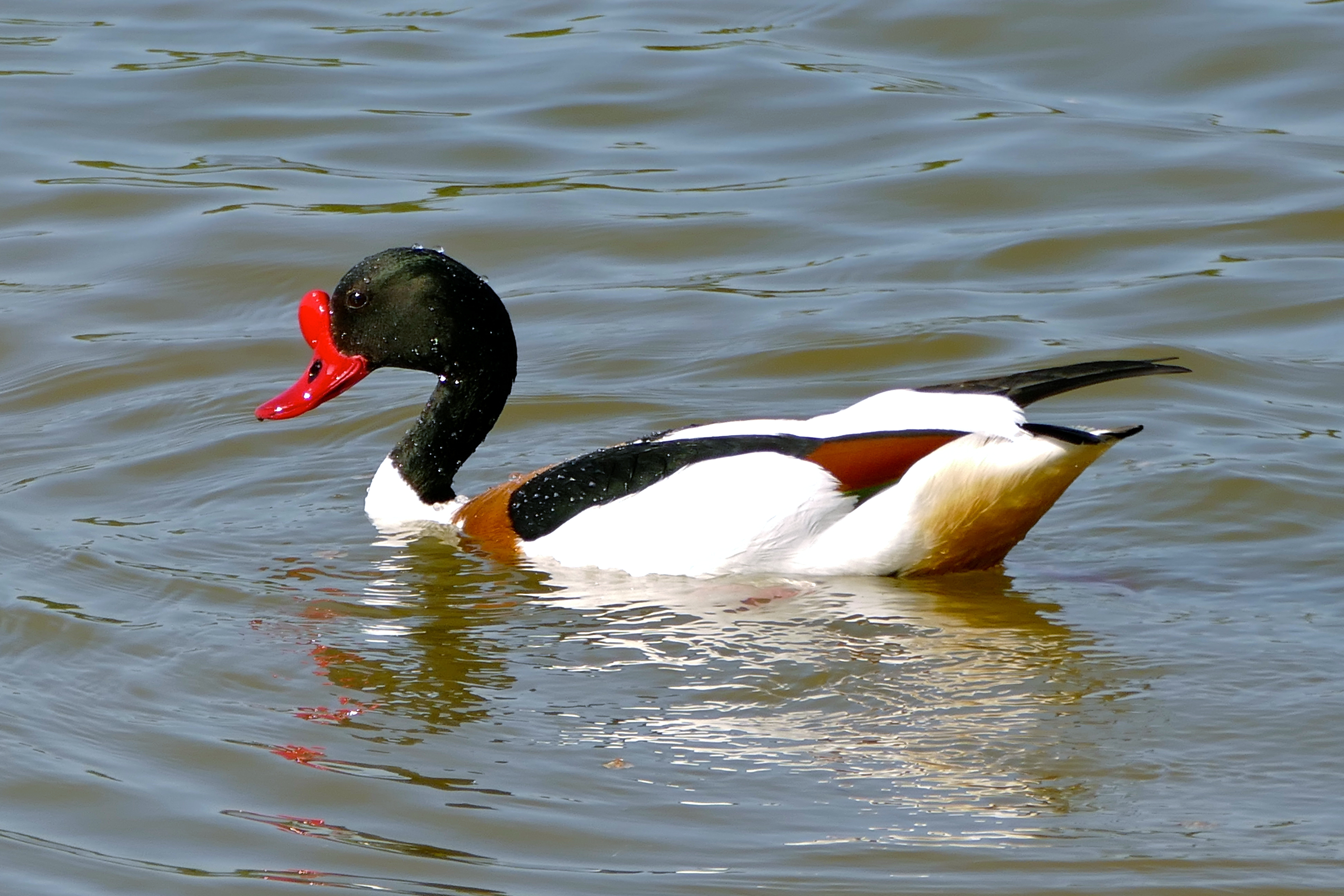
Common shelduck, Estany del Cortalet, Los Aiguamolls del' Empordà, Castelló d'Empúries, Catalonia

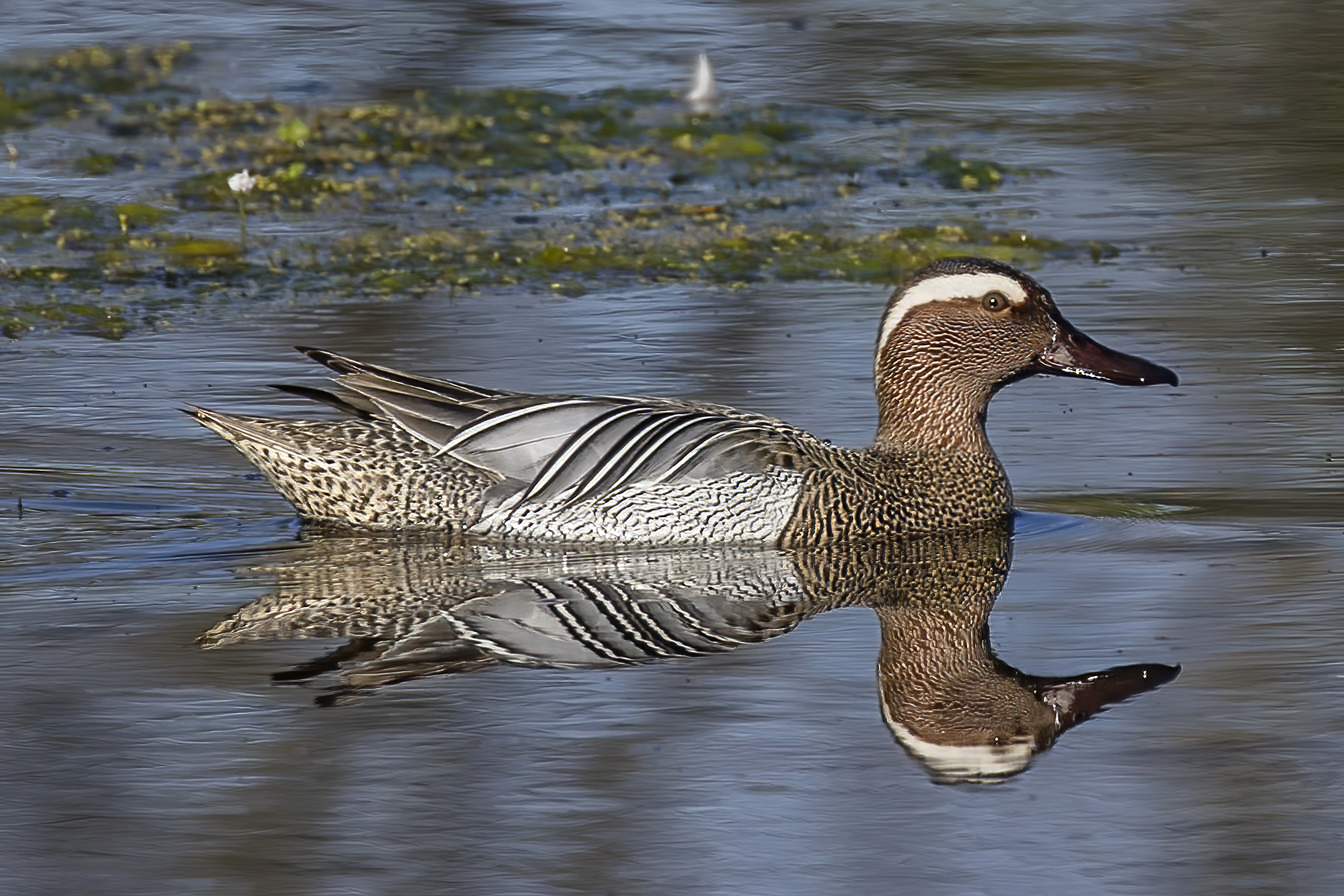
Garganey, Estanque de San Lázaro, Trujillo, Spain

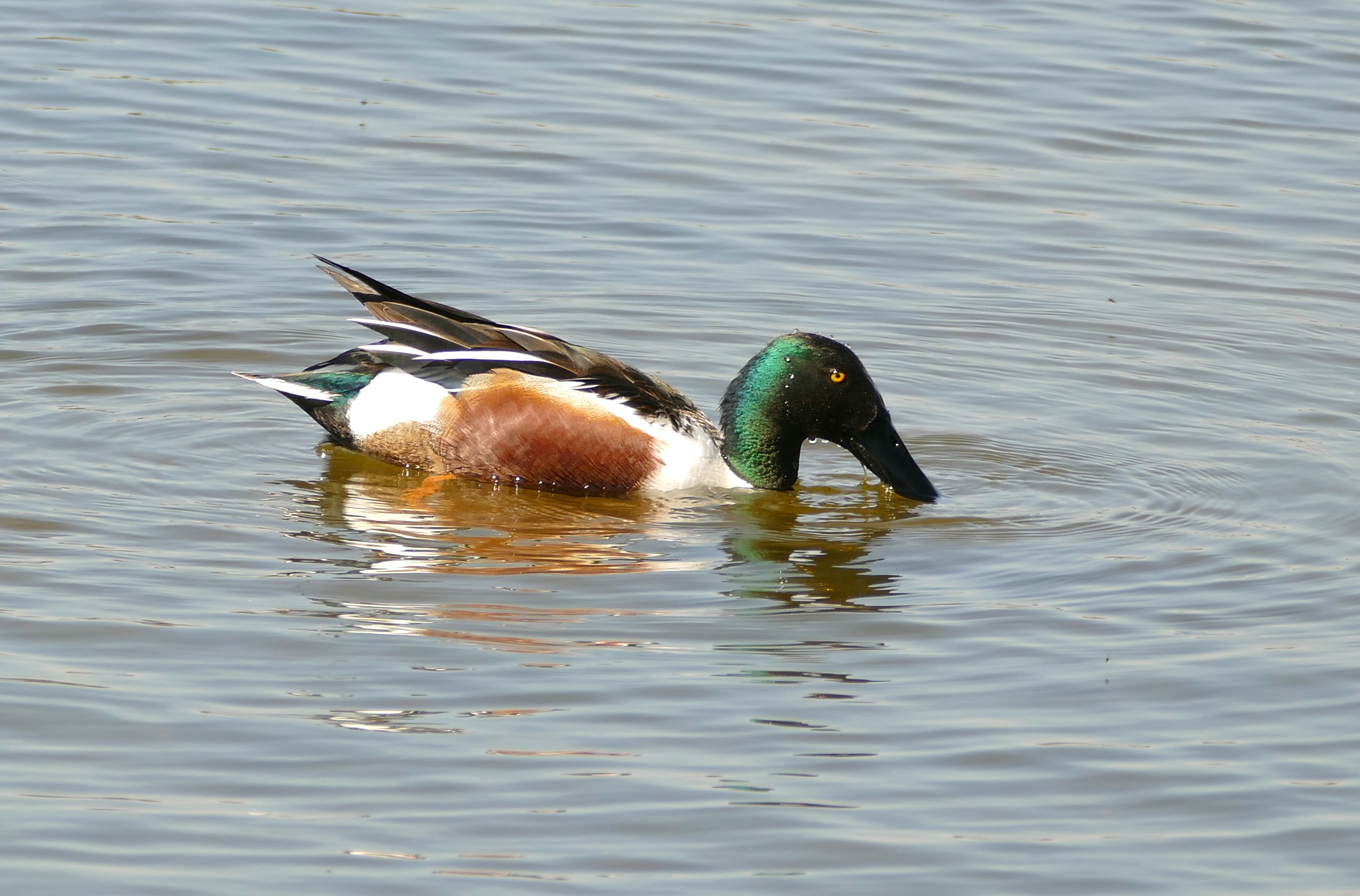
Northern shoveler, Castelló d'Empúries, Catalonia

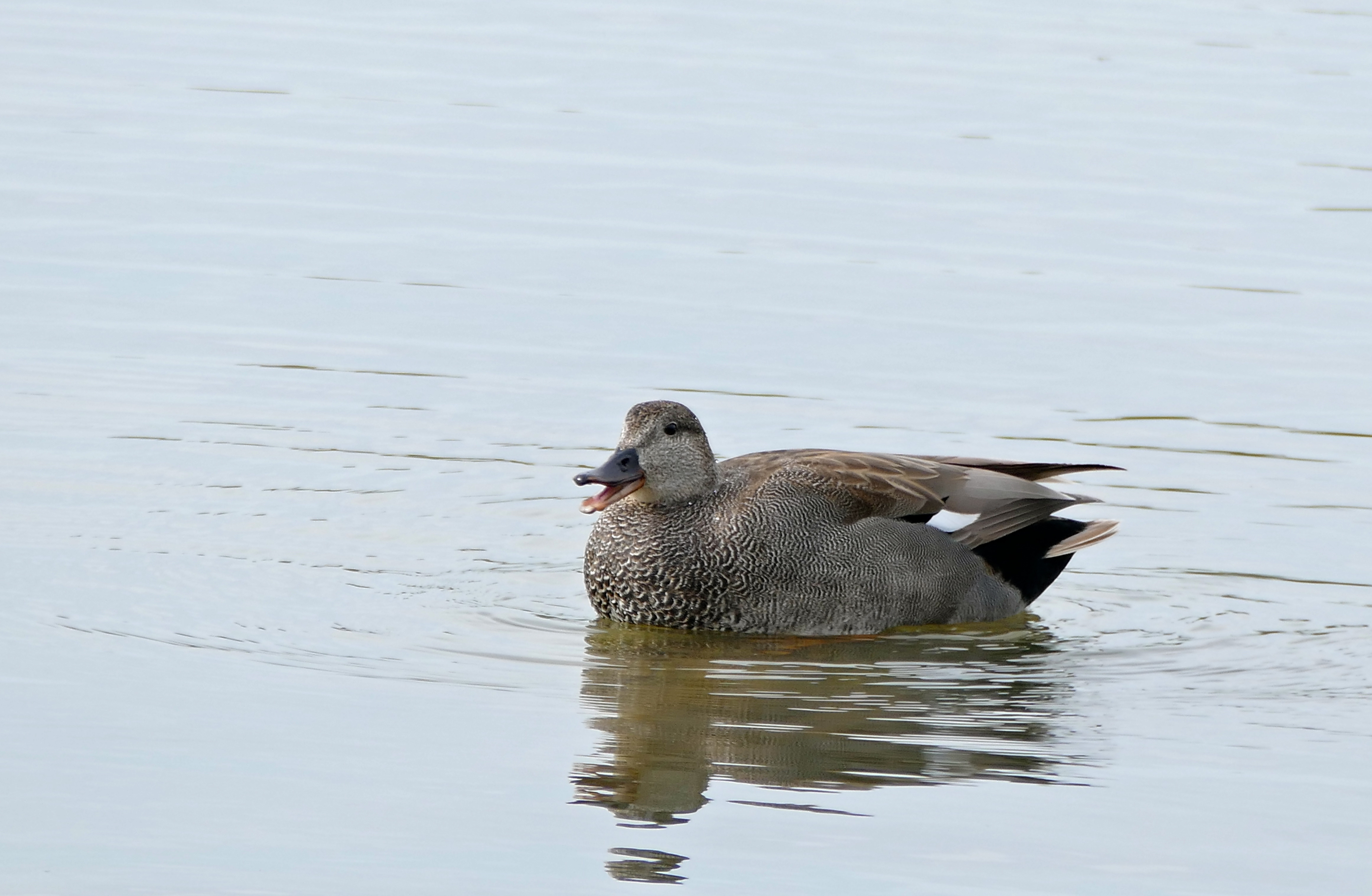
Gadwall, Castelló d'Empúries, Catalonia

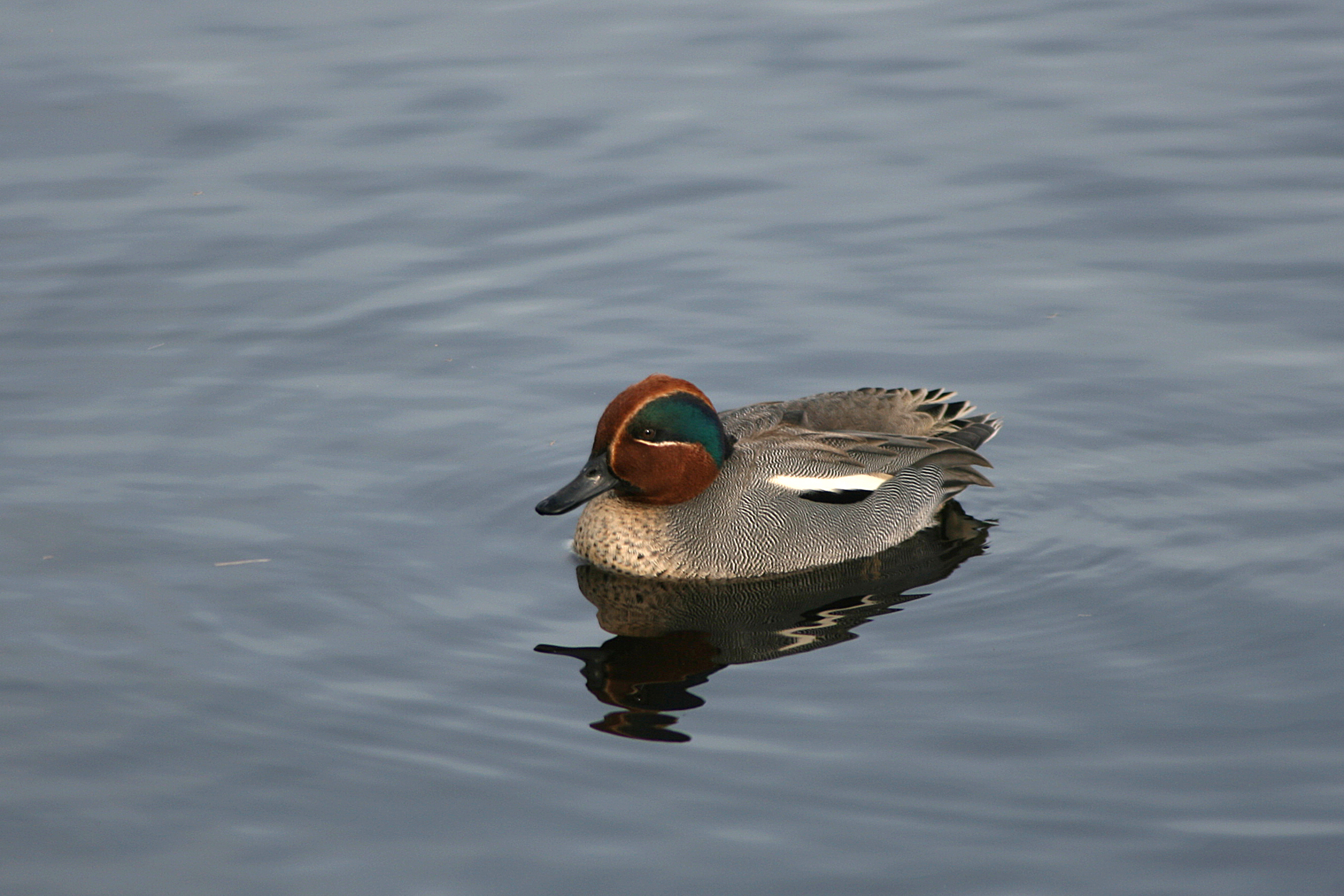
Eurasian teal, Aiguamolls de l'Empordà, Catalonia

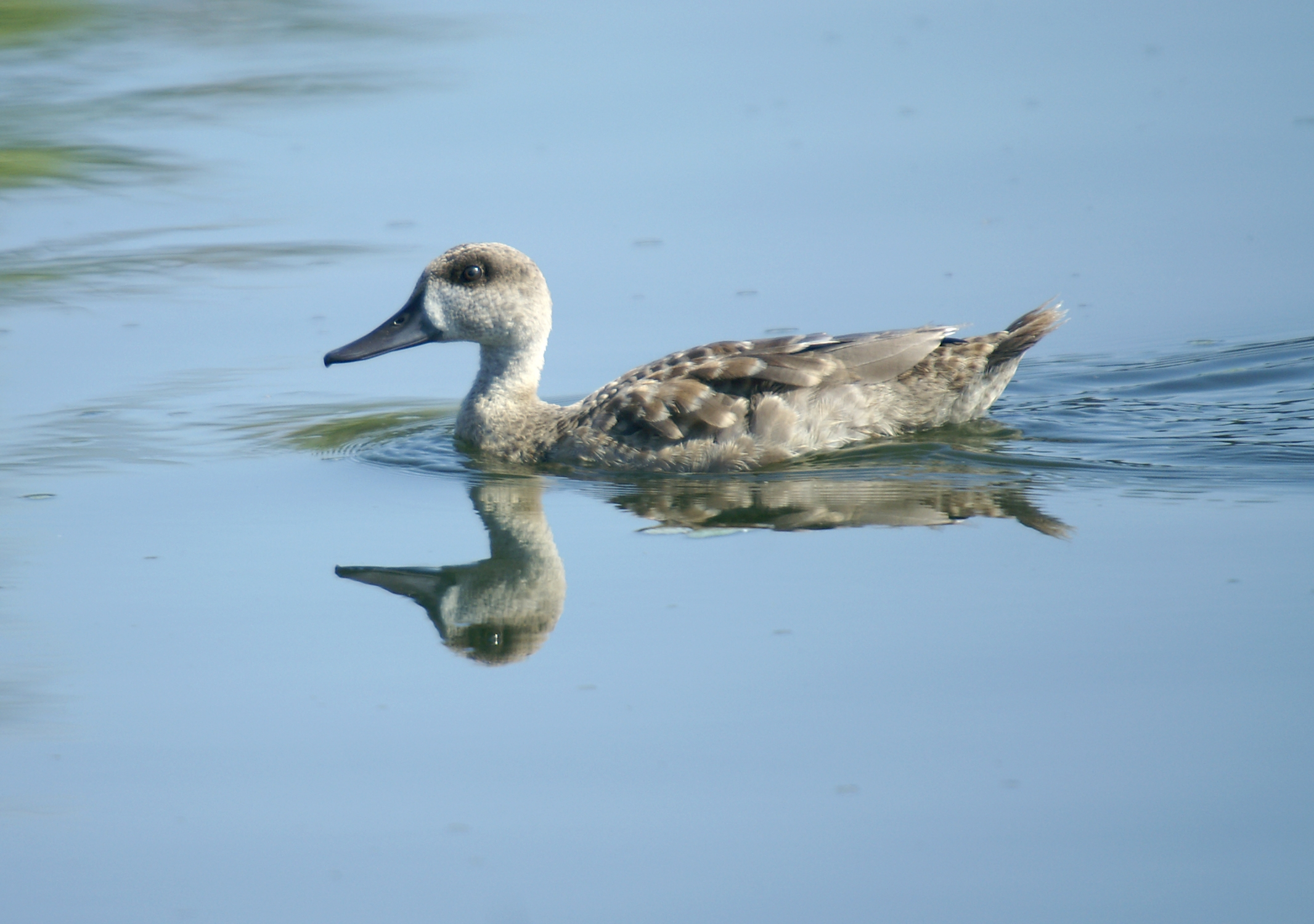
Marbled teal, Clot-de-Galvany, Alicante

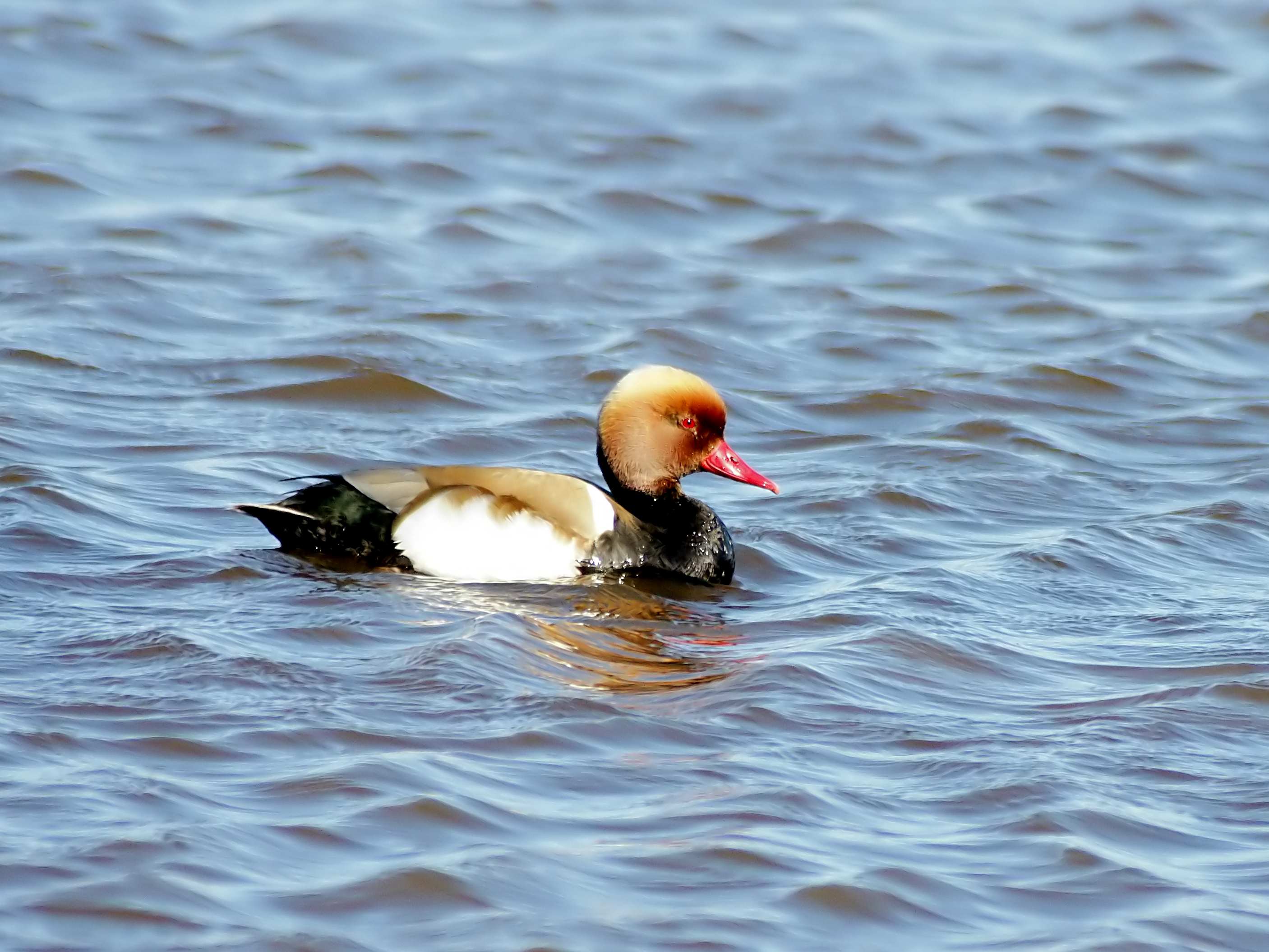
Red-crested pochard, Albufera, Mallorca

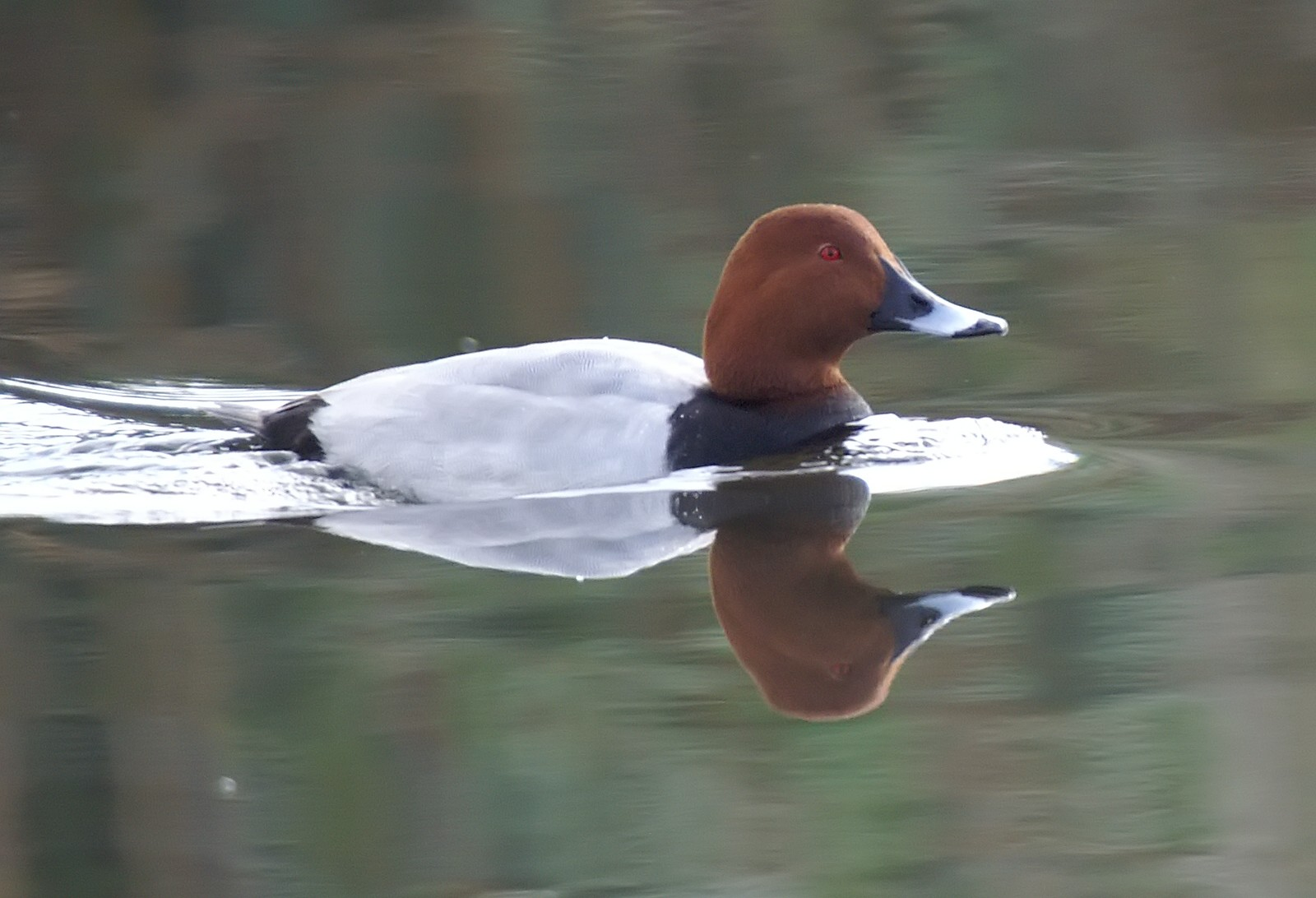
Common pochard, Alicante

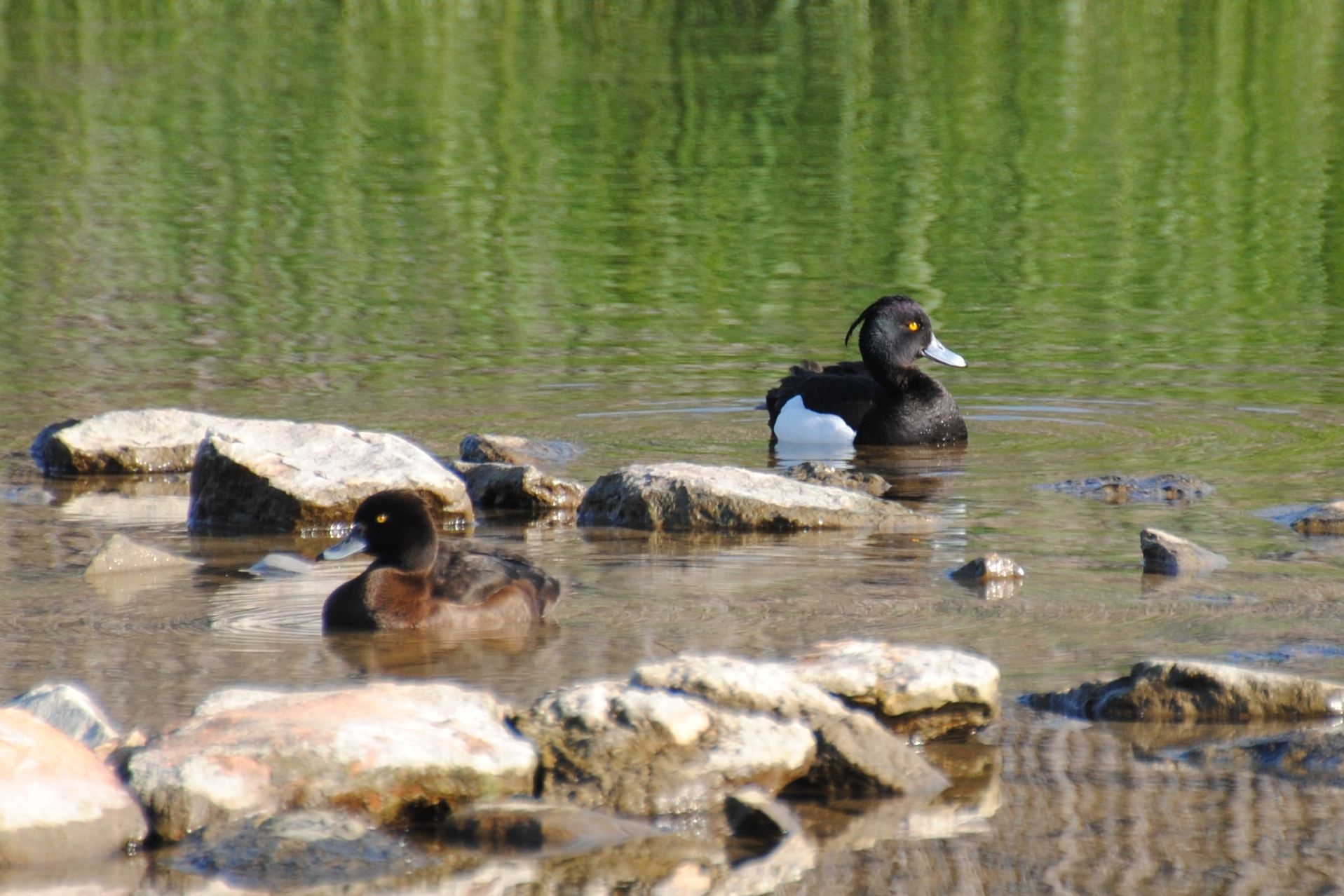
Tufted ducks, Tablas de Daimiel National Park, Ciudad Real

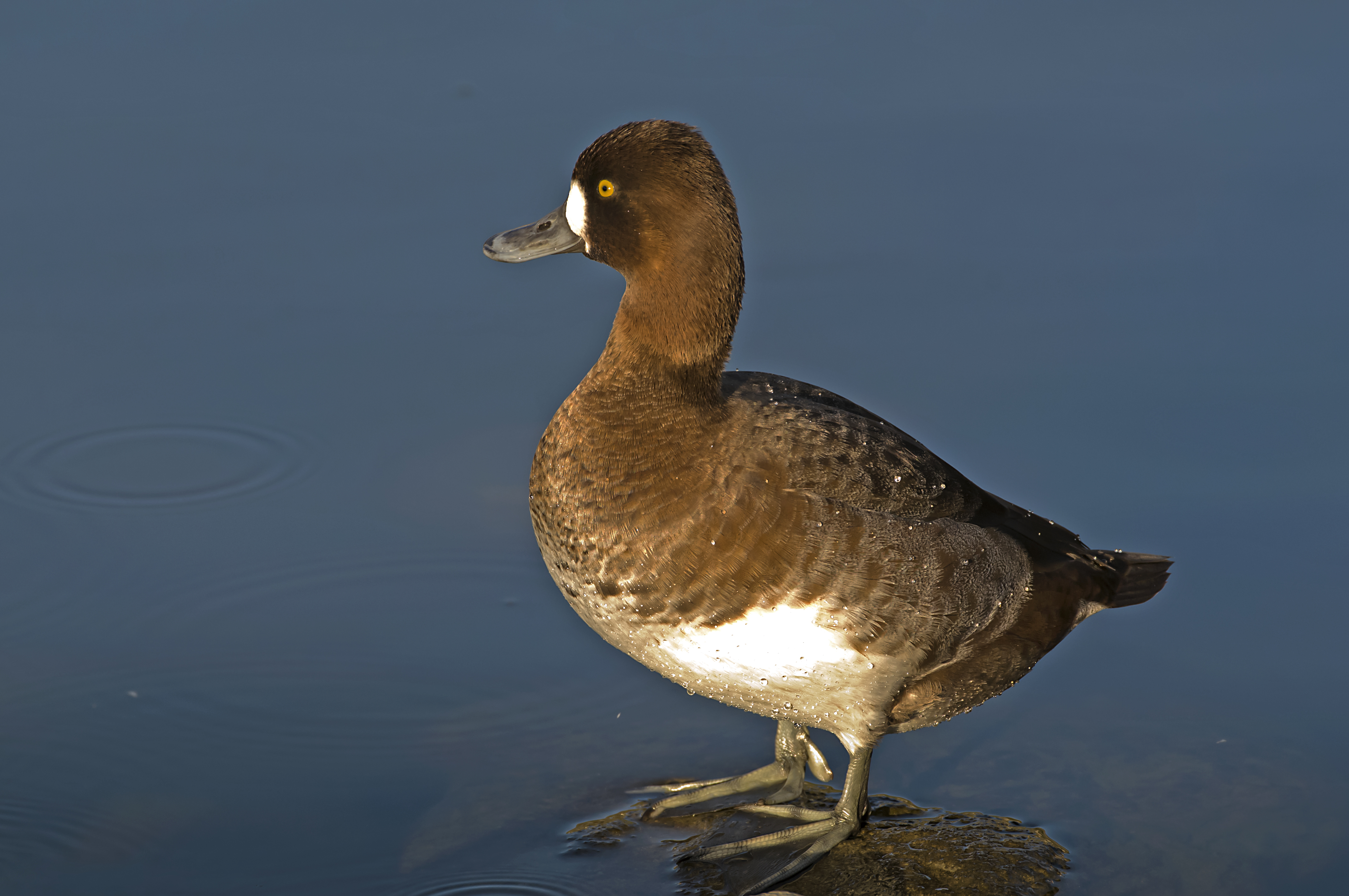
Lesser scaup (vagrant), Gran Canaria

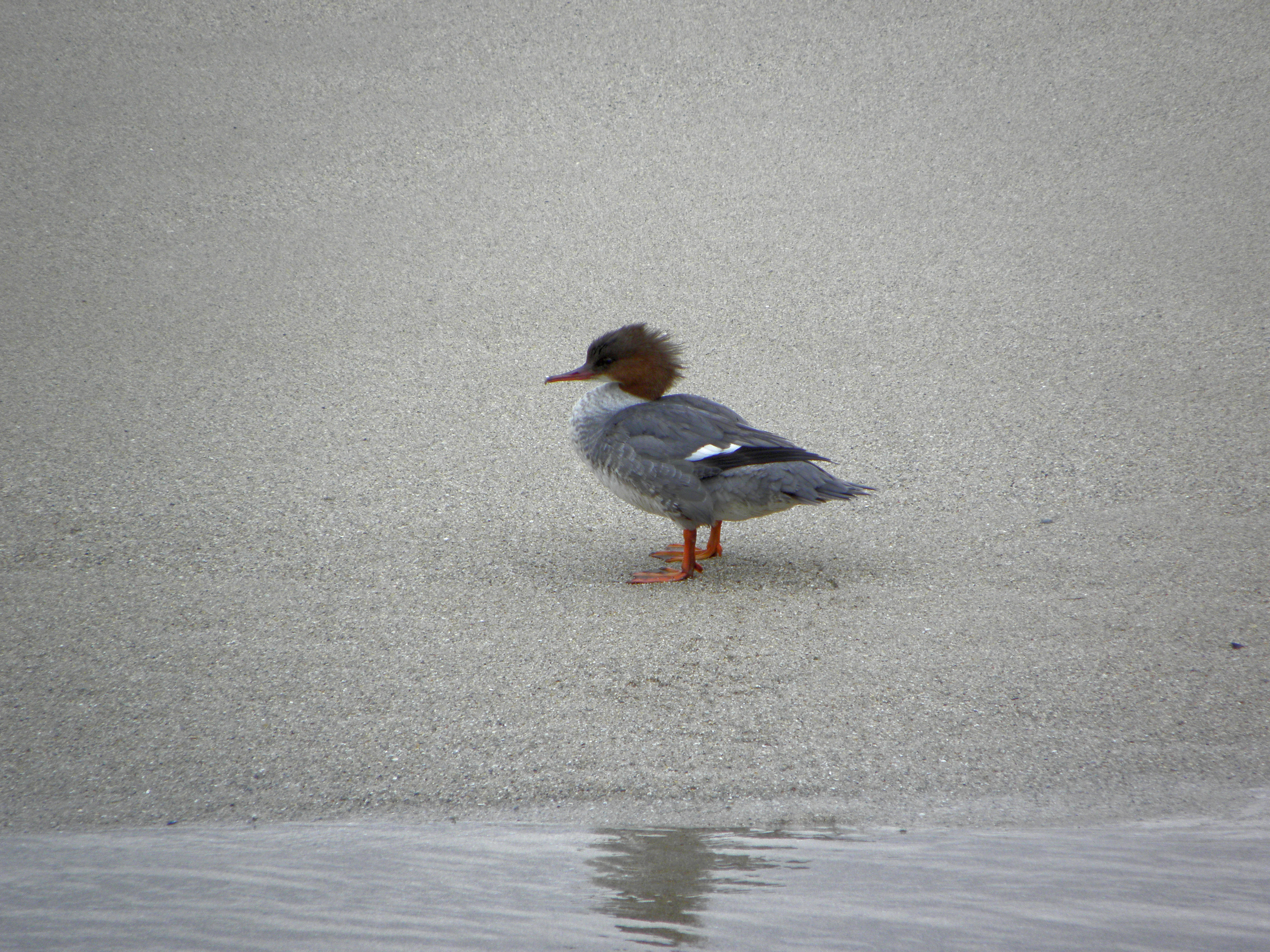
Goosander, Carballo, Galicia

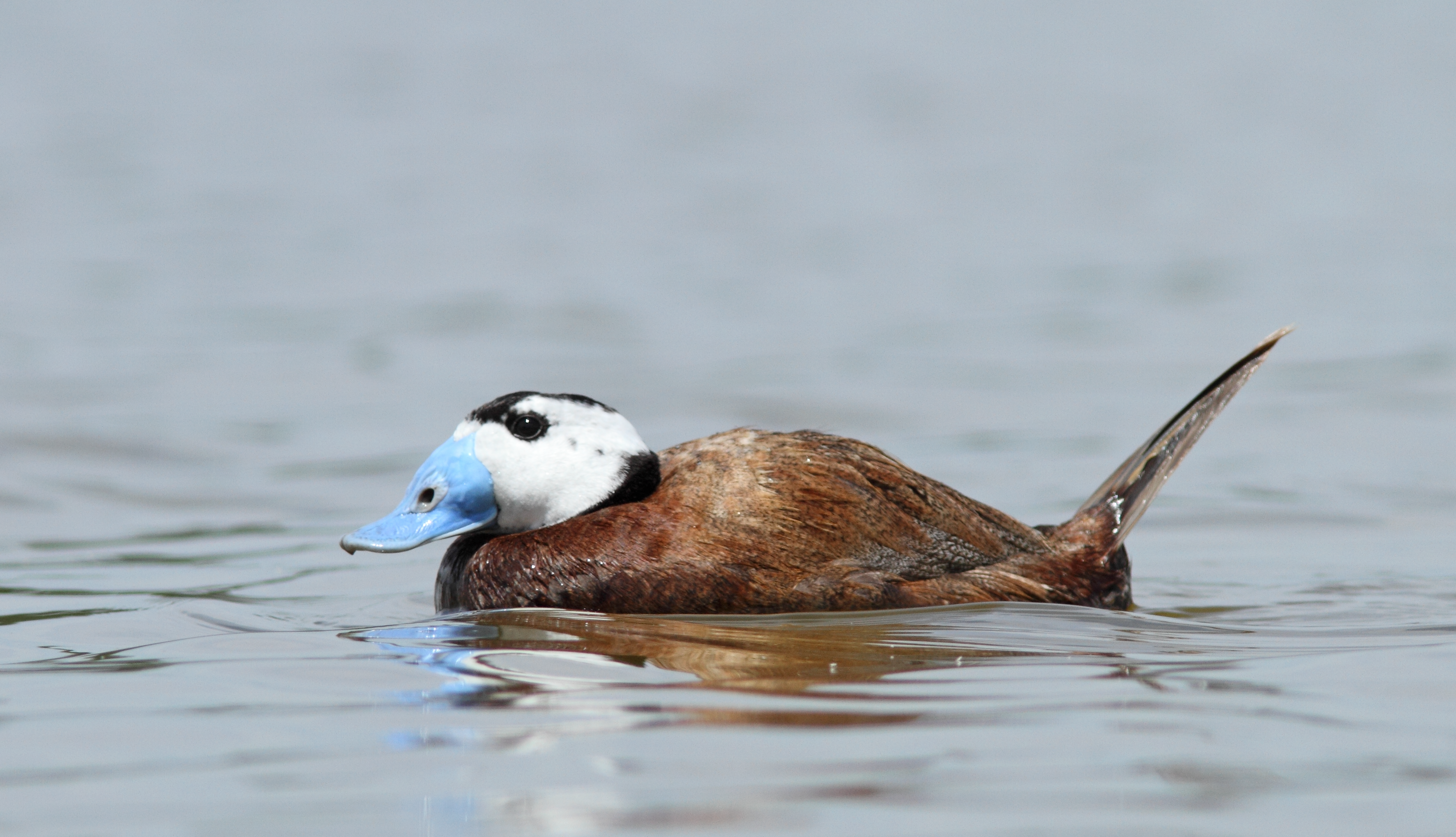
White-headed duck, Andalusia

== Pheasants, grouse, and allies ==
Order: Galliformes Family: Phasianidae

The Phasianidae are a family of terrestrial birds. In general, they are plump, although they vary in size, and have broad, relatively short wings.

- Hazel grouse (grévol común), Tetrastes bonasia (B)
- Rock ptarmigan (lagópodo alpino), Lagopus muta
- Western capercaillie (urogallo común), Tetrao urogallus
- Grey partridge (perdiz pardilla), Perdix perdix
- Common pheasant (faisán común), Phasianus colchicus (C)
- Common quail (codorniz común), Coturnix coturnix
- Barbary partridge (perdiz moruna), Alectoris barbara (native in North African territories, category C on Canary Islands)
- Red-legged partridge (perdiz roja), Alectoris rufa
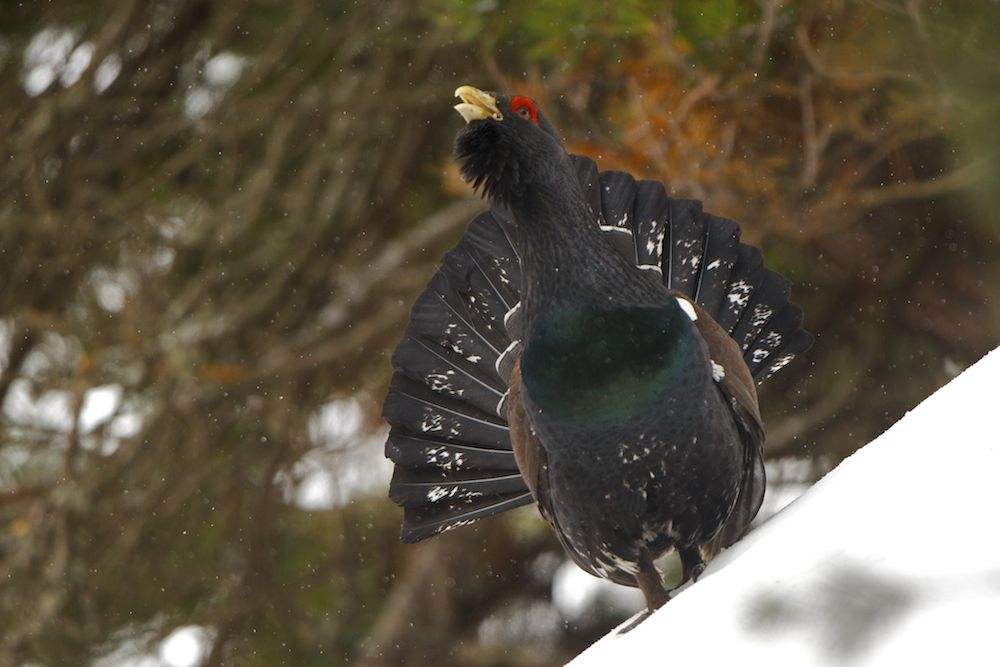
Western capercaillie, Spanish Pyrenees

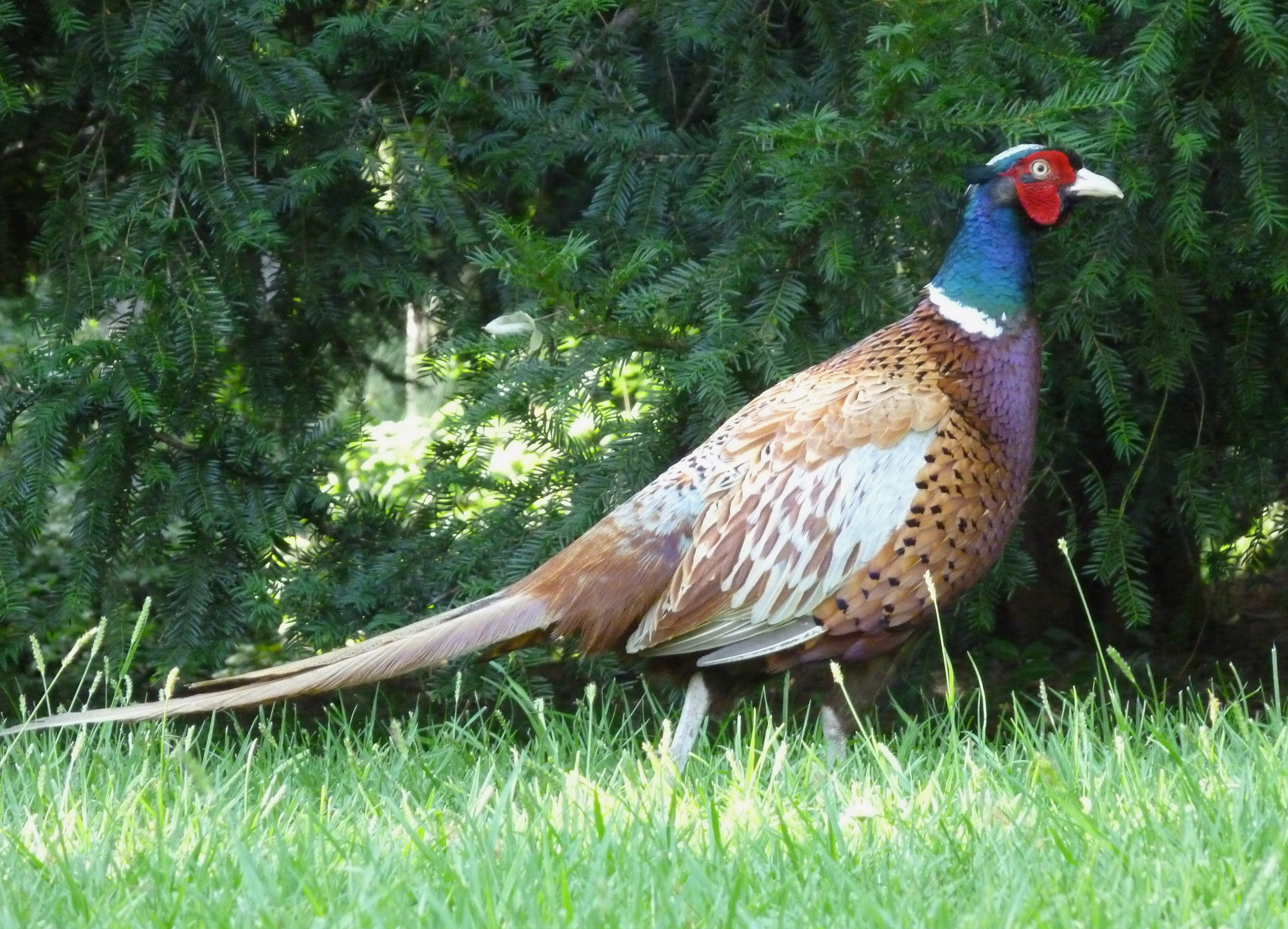
Common pheasant, Madrid

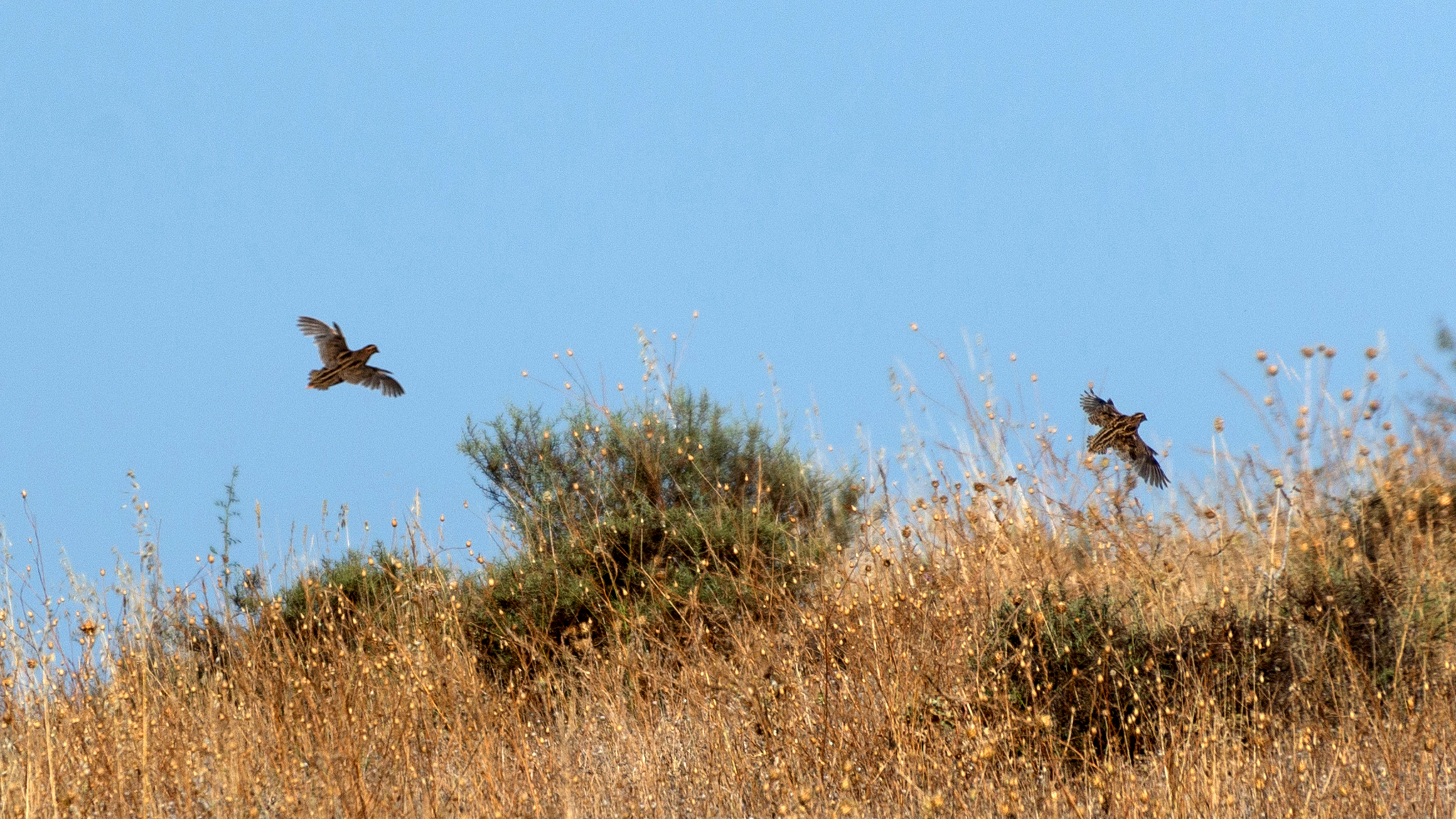
Common quail, Cuntis, Galicia

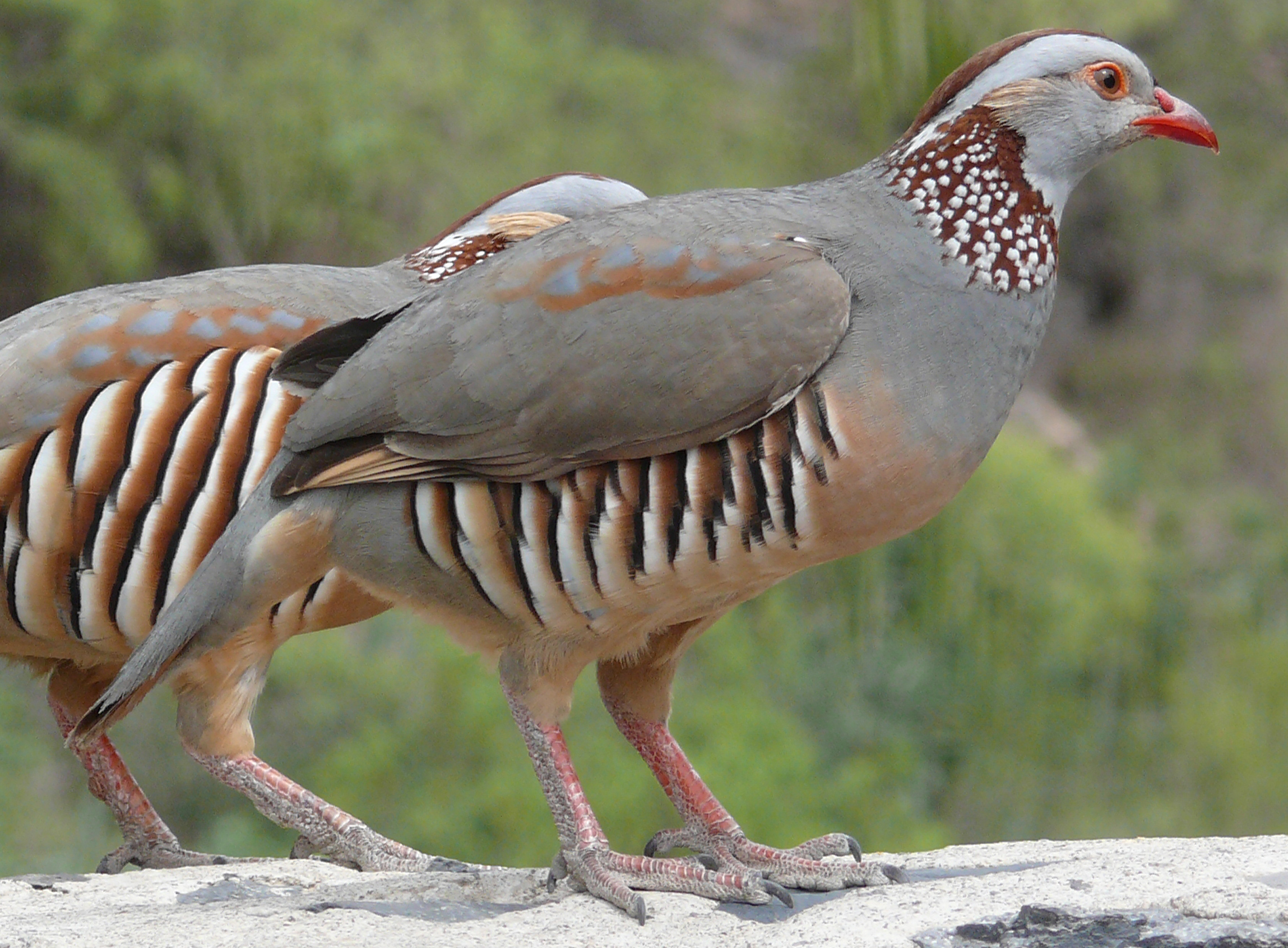
Barbary partridges, Barranco del Infierno, Tenerife

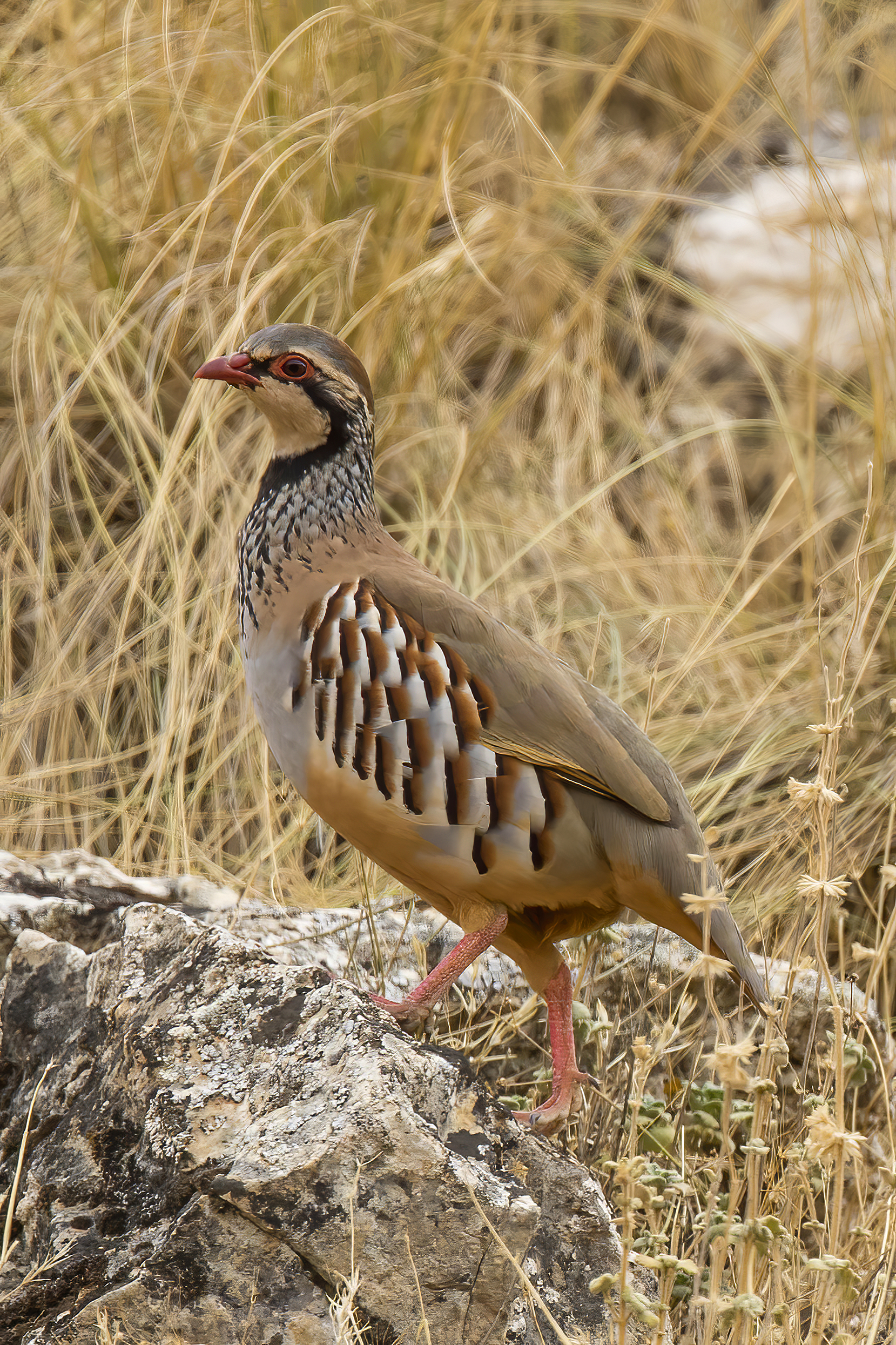
Red-legged partridge, Loja, Granada

== Nightjars and allies ==
Order: Caprimulgiformes Family: Caprimulgidae

Nightjars are medium-sized nocturnal birds that usually nest on the ground. They have long wings, short legs and very short bills. Most have small feet, of little use for walking, and long pointed wings. Their soft plumage is camouflaged to resemble bark or leaves.

- Common nighthawk (añapero yanqui), Chordeiles minor (R)
- Red-necked nightjar (chotacabras cuellirrojo), Caprimulgus ruficollis
- Eurasian nightjar (chotacabras europeo), Caprimulgus europaeus
- Egyptian nightjar (chotacabras egipcio), Caprimulgus aegyptius (R)

== Swifts ==
Order: Caprimulgiformes Family: Apodidae

Swifts are small birds which spend the majority of their lives flying. These birds have very short legs and never settle voluntarily on the ground, perching instead only on vertical surfaces. Many swifts have long swept-back wings which resemble a crescent or boomerang.

- Chimney swift (vencejo de chimenea), Chaetura pelagica (R)
- Alpine swift (vencejo real), Tachymarptis melba
- Common swift (vencejo común), Apus apus
- Plain swift (vencejo unicolor), Apus unicolor (R except on Canary Islands)
- Pallid swift (vencejo pálido), Apus pallidus
- Little swift (vencejo moro), Apus affinis
- White-rumped swift (vencejo cafre), Apus caffer
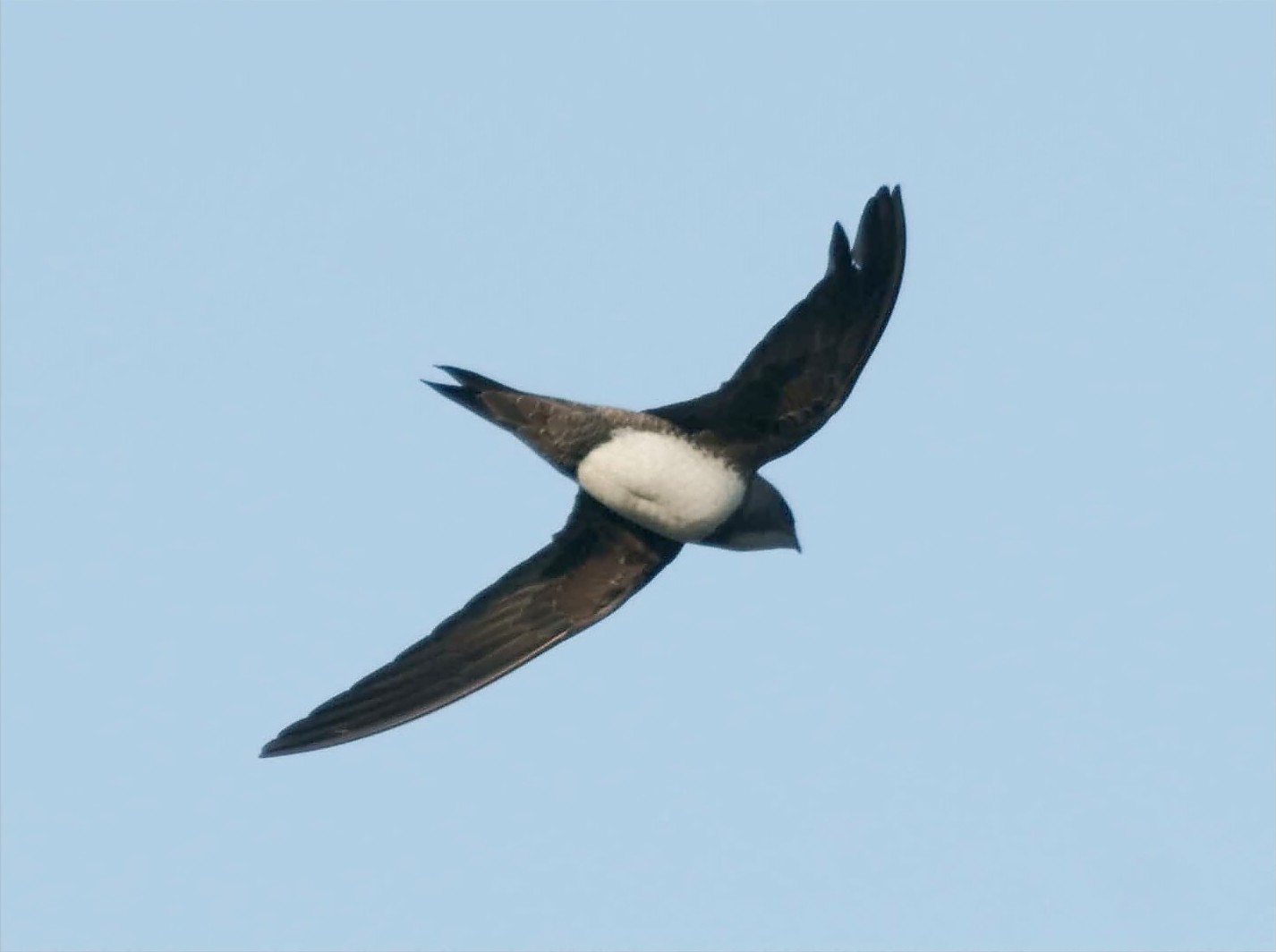
Alpine swift, Llobregat Delta, Barcelona

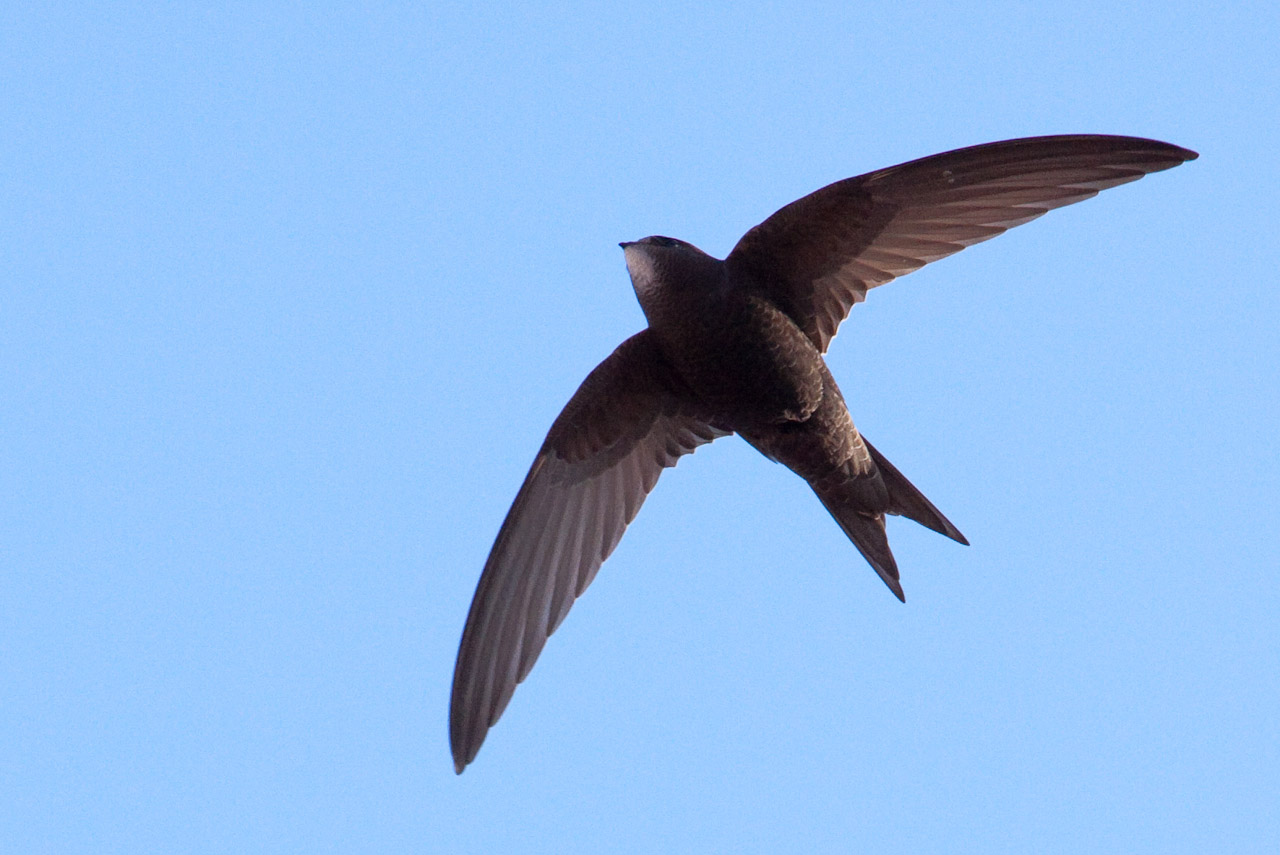
Common swift, Barcelona

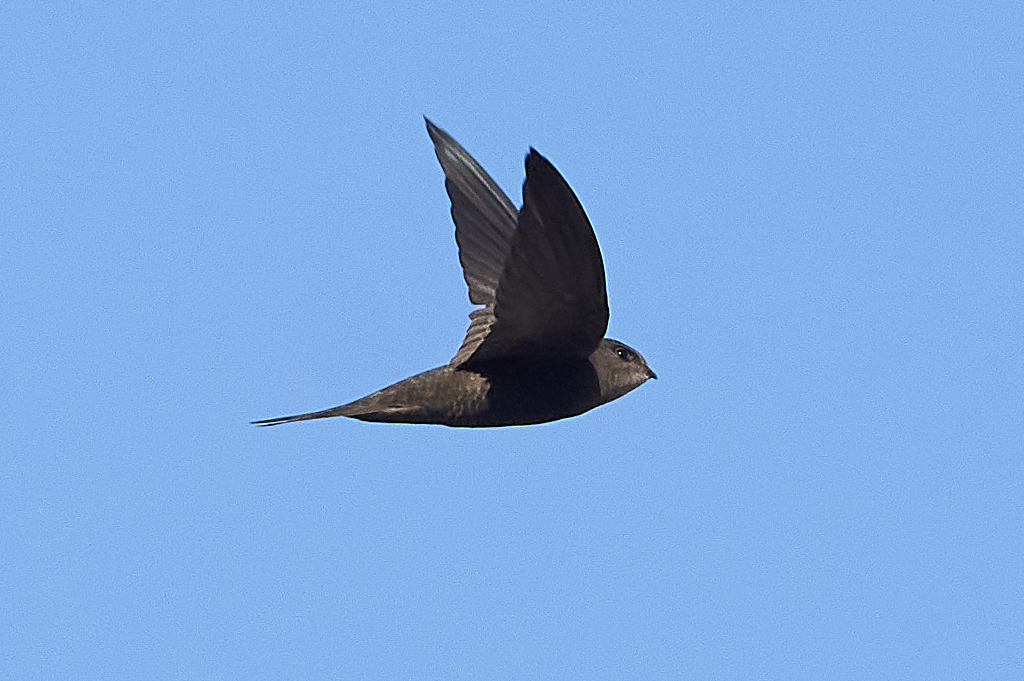
Plain swift, La Gomera, Canary Islands

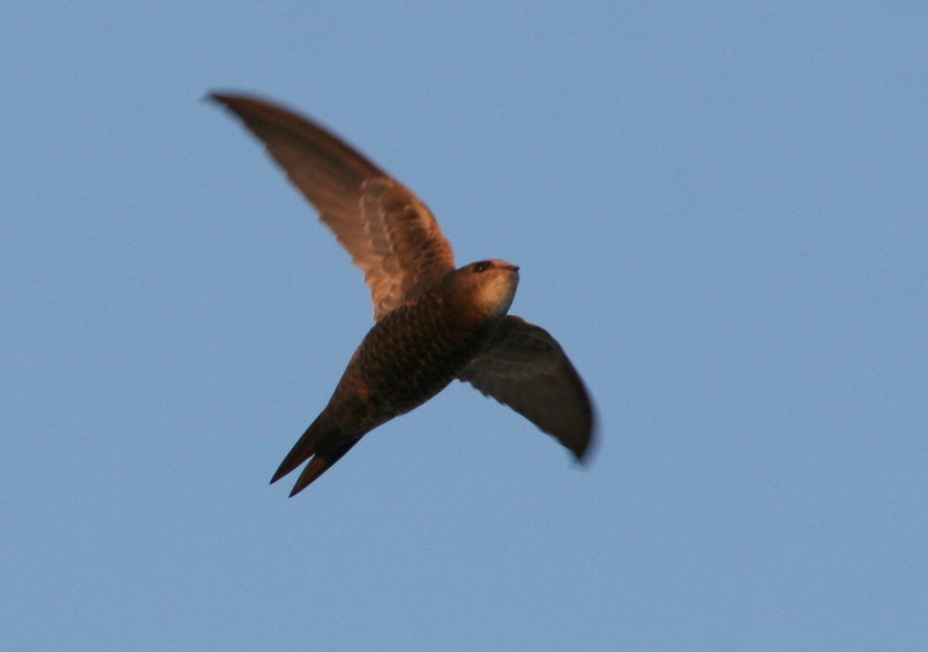
Pallid swift, Tarifa

== Bustards ==
Order: Otidiformes Family: Otididae

Bustards are large terrestrial birds mainly associated with dry open country and steppes in the Old World. They are omnivorous and nest on the ground. They walk steadily on strong legs and big toes, pecking for food as they go. They have long broad wings with "fingered" wingtips and striking patterns in flight. Many have interesting mating displays.

- Great bustard (avutarda euroasiática), Otis tarda vulnerable
- Houbara bustard (avutarda hubara africana), Chlamydotis undulata (Canary Islands only)
- Little bustard (sisón común), Tetrax tetrax
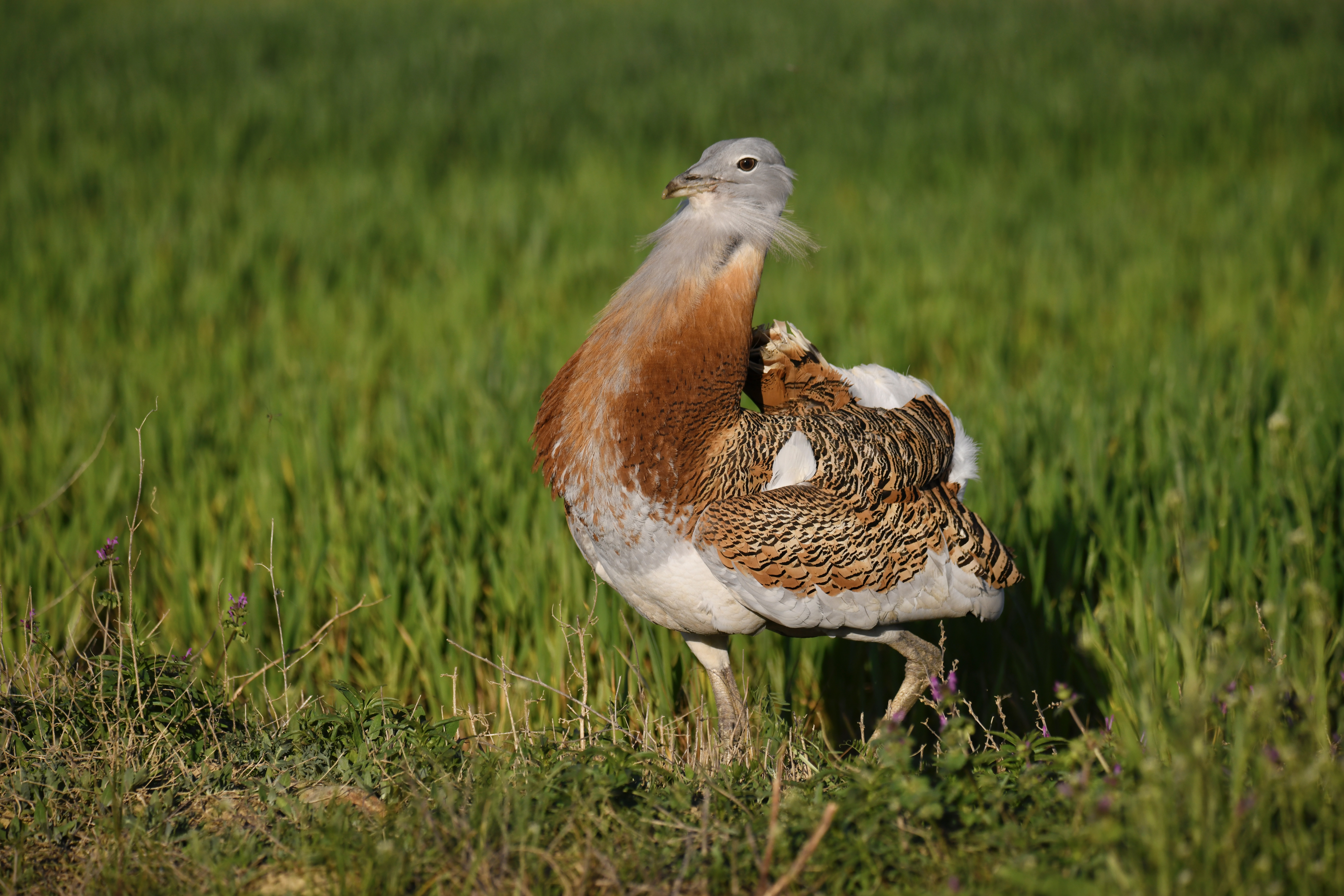
Great bustard, Villafáfila, Zamora, Castile and León

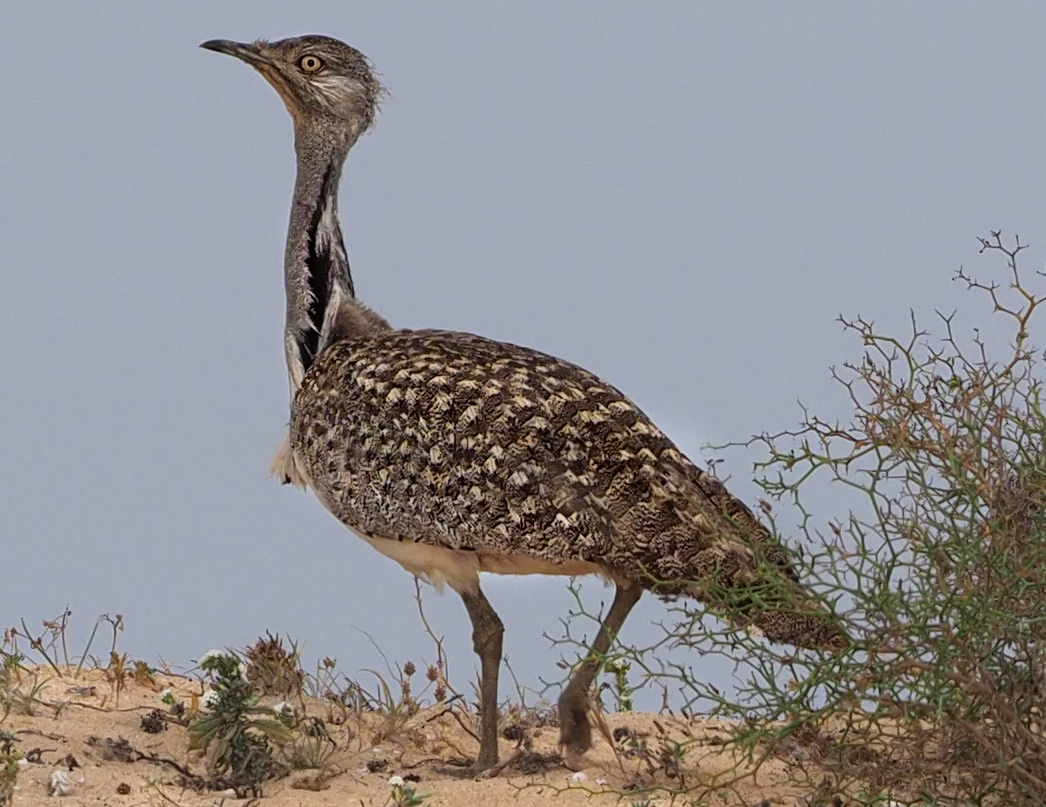
Houbara bustard, El Jable Plains, Lanzarote, Canary Islands

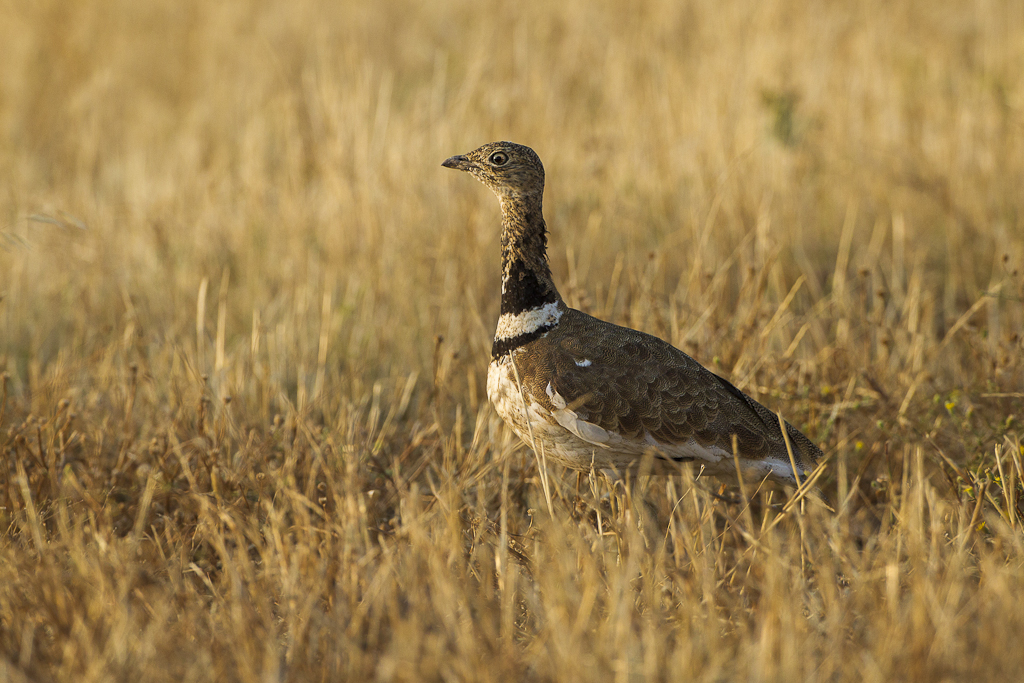
Little bustard, Castuera, Extremadura

== Cuckoos ==
Order: Cuculiformes Family: Cuculidae

The family Cuculidae includes cuckoos, roadrunners and anis. These birds are of variable size with slender bodies, long tails and strong legs. The Old World cuckoos are brood parasites.

- Great spotted cuckoo (críalo europeo), Clamator glandarius
- Yellow-billed cuckoo (cuclillo piquigualdo), Coccyzus americanus (R)
- Common cuckoo (cuco común), Cuculus canorus
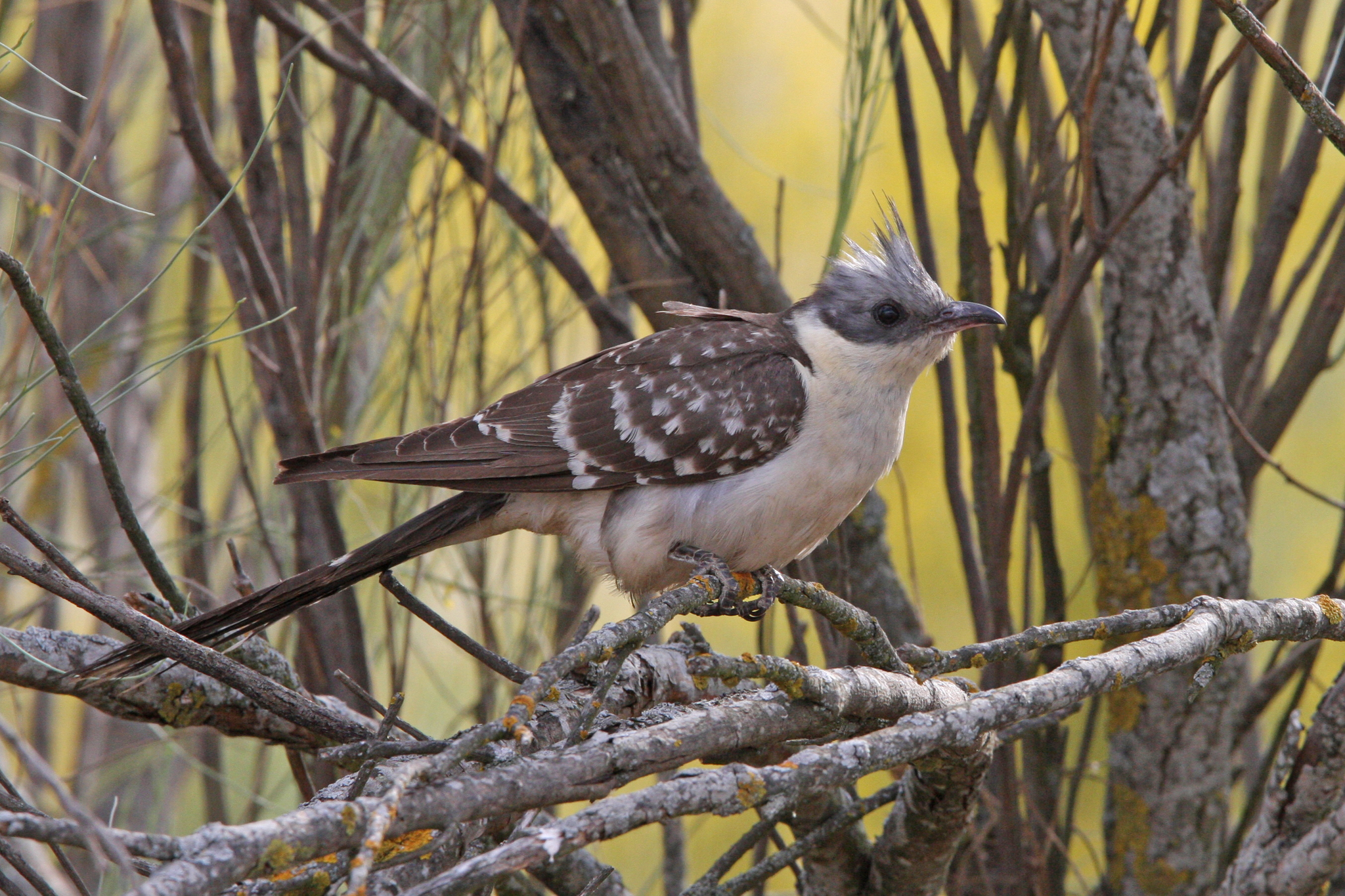
Great spotted cuckoo, Extremadura

== Sandgrouse ==
Order: Pterocliformes Family: Pteroclidae

Sandgrouse have small, pigeon like heads and necks, but sturdy compact bodies. They have long pointed wings and sometimes tails and a fast direct flight. Flocks fly to watering holes at dawn and dusk. Their legs are feathered down to the toes.

- Pallas's sandgrouse (ganga de Pallas), Syrrhaptes paradoxus (B)
- Pin-tailed sandgrouse (ganga ibérica), Pterocles alchata
- Black-bellied sandgrouse (ganga ortega), Pterocles orientalis
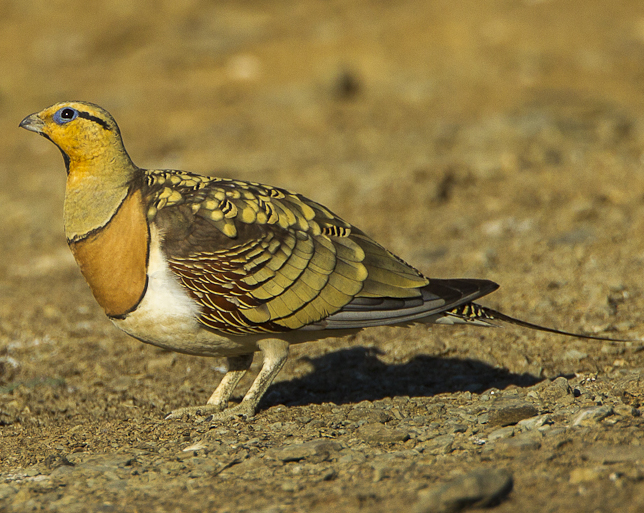
Pin-tailed sandgrouse, Castuera, Badajoz, Extremadura

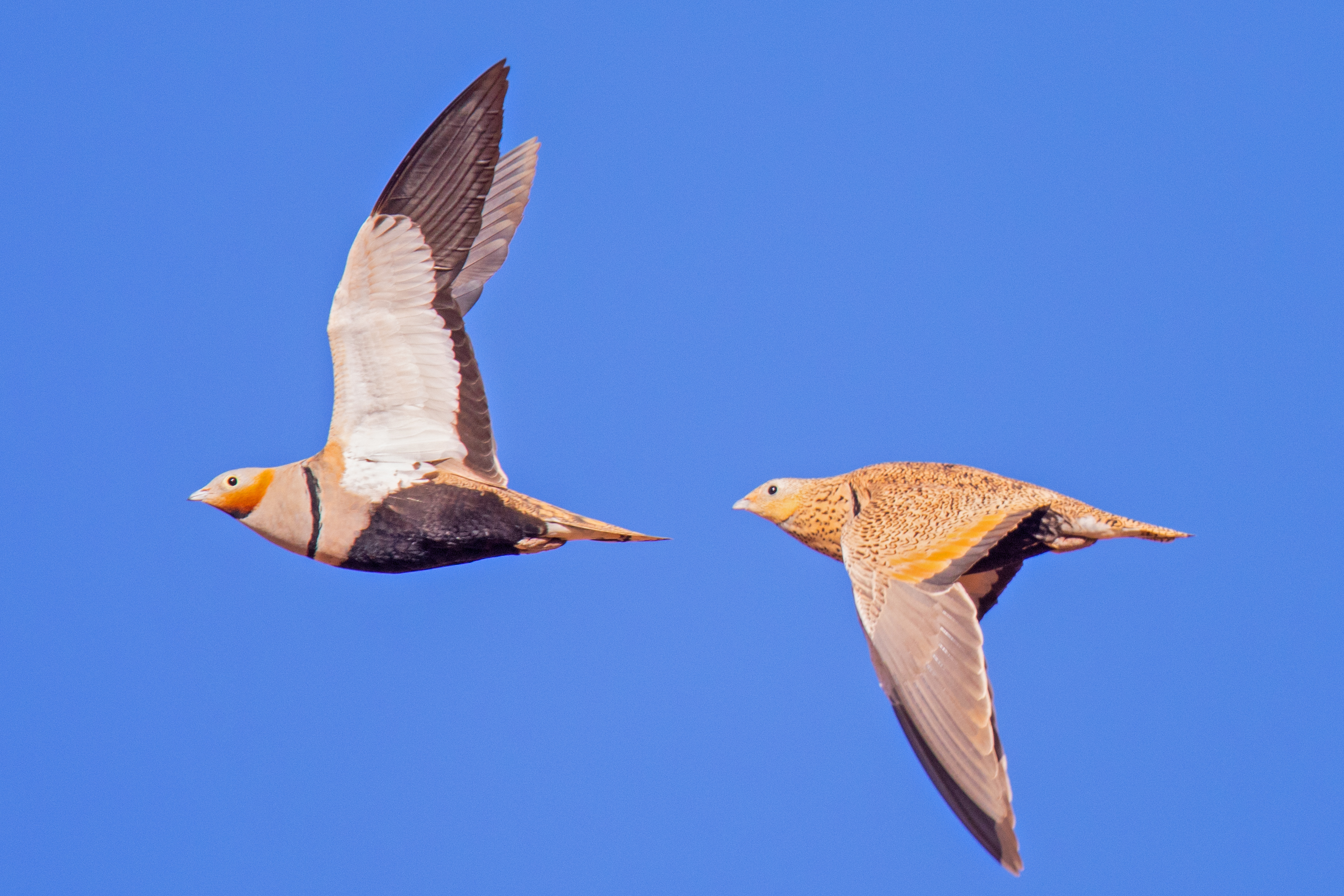
Black-bellied sandgrouse, Los Molinos Reservoir, Fuerteventura, Canary Islands

== Pigeons and doves ==
Order: Columbiformes Family: Columbidae

Pigeons and doves are stout-bodied birds with short necks and short slender bills with a fleshy cere.

- Rock dove (paloma bravía), Columba livia
- Stock dove (paloma zurita), Columba oenas
- Common wood pigeon (paloma torcaz), Columba palumbus
- Bolle's pigeon (paloma turqué), Columba bollii (E – Canary Islands)
- Laurel pigeon (paloma rabiche), Columba junoniae (E – Canary Islands)
- European turtle dove (tórtola europea), Streptopelia turtur
- Oriental turtle dove (tórtola oriental), Streptopelia orientalis (R)
- Eurasian collared dove (tórtola turca), Streptopelia decaocto
- Laughing dove (tórtola senegalesa), Spilopelia senegalensis (R on mainland Spain only)
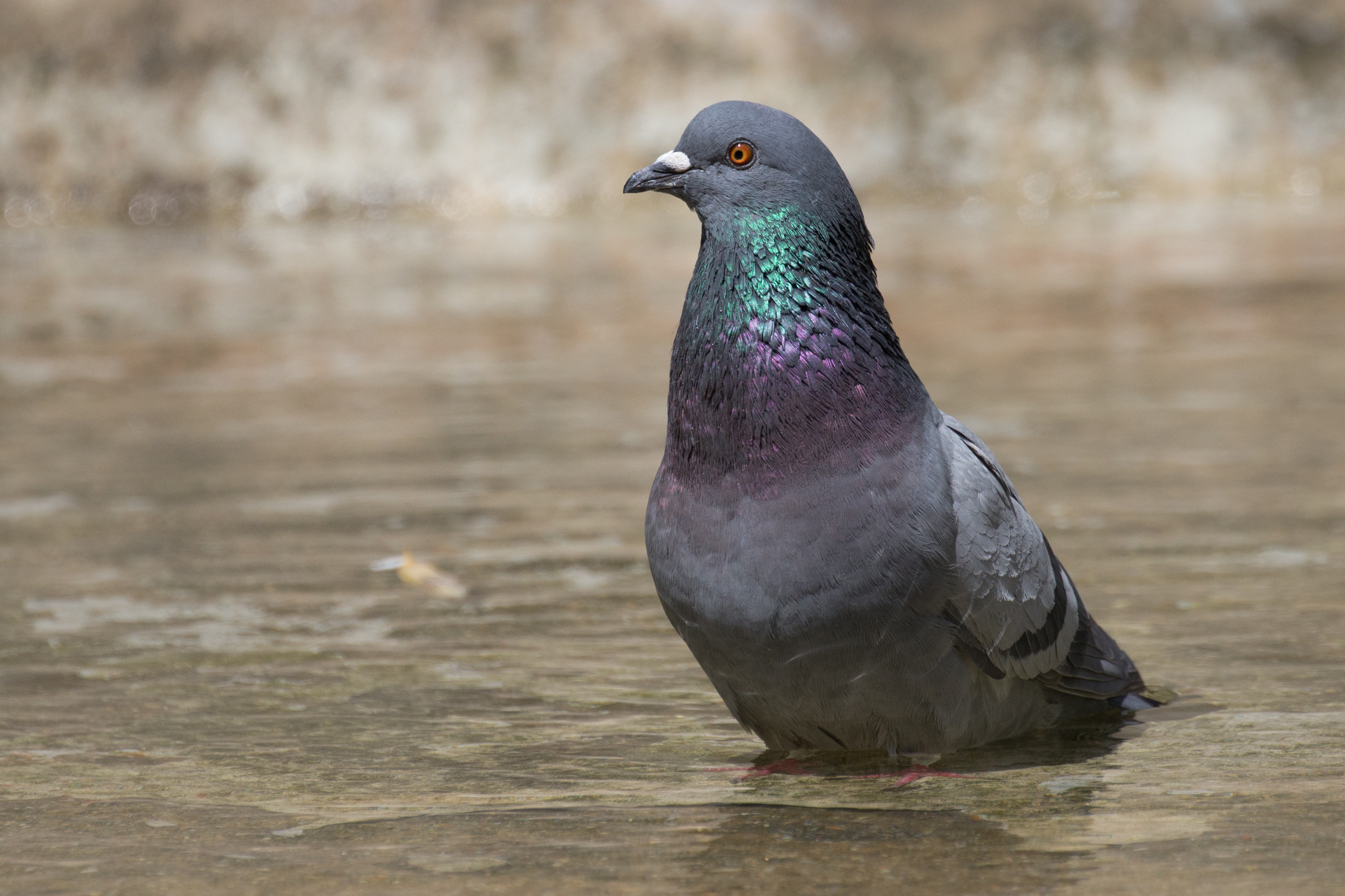
Rock dove (feral pigeon), Retiro Park, Madrid

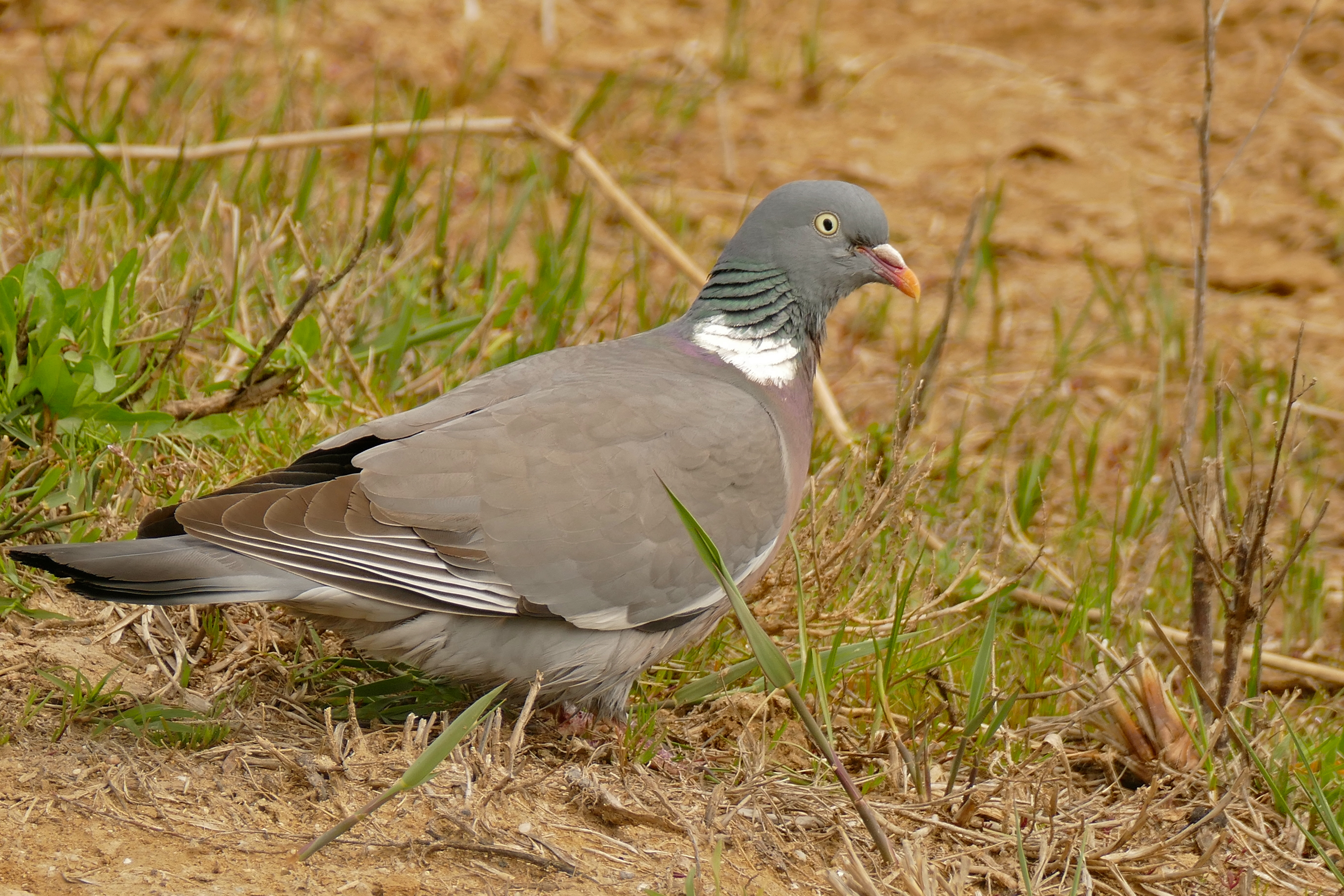
Common wood pigeon, Castelló d'Empúries, Catalonia

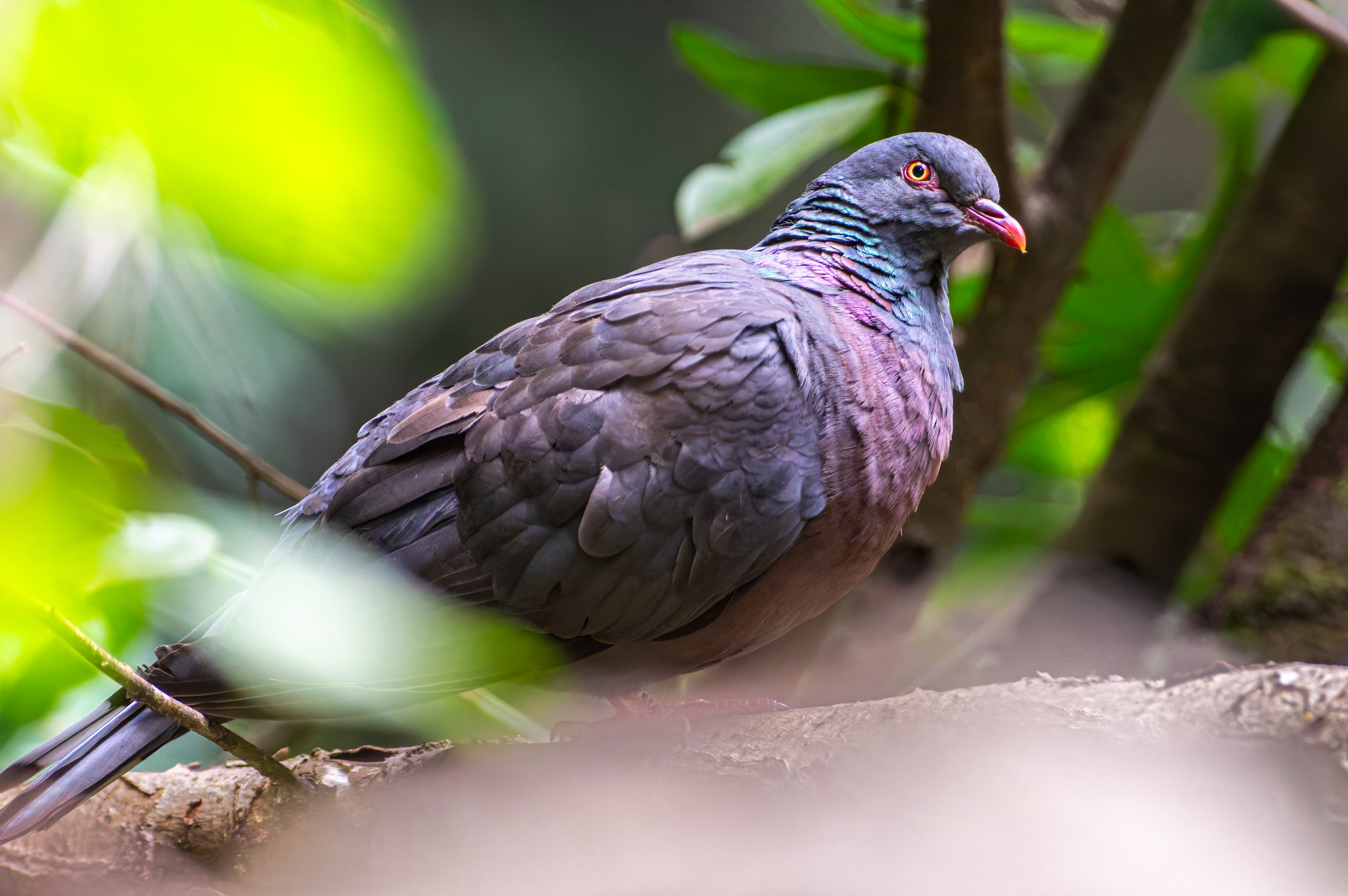
Bolle's pigeon, La Palma

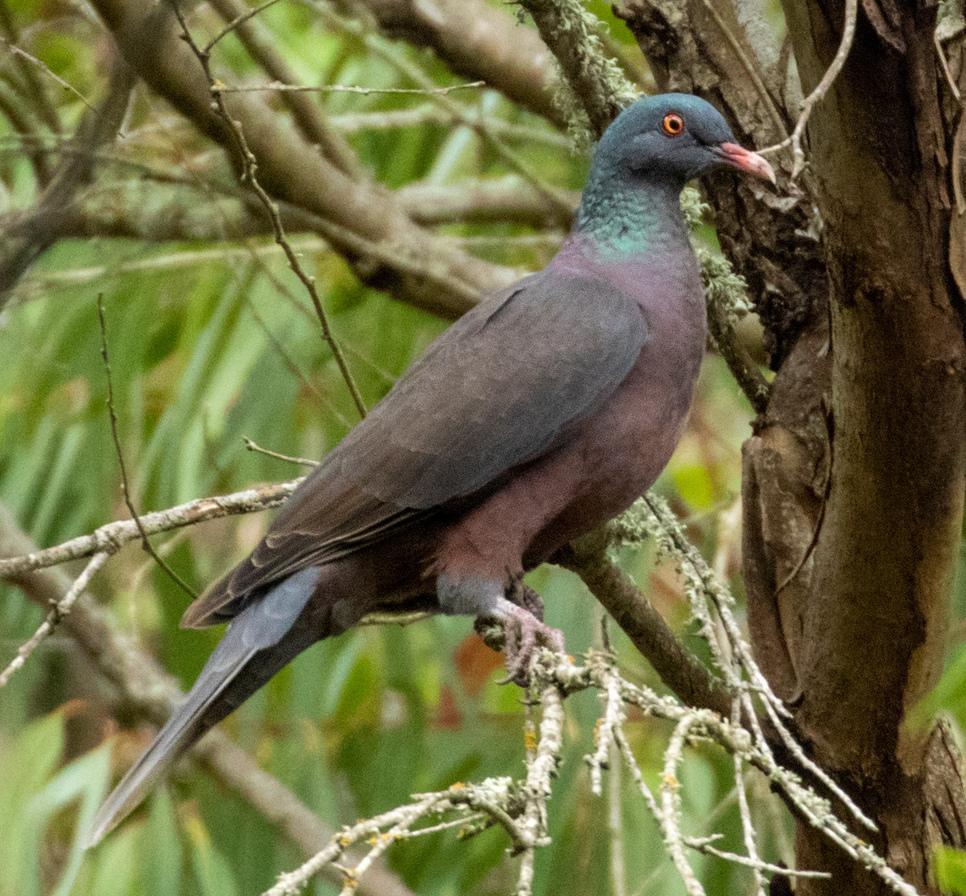
Laurel pigeon, Las Palmas, Canary Islands

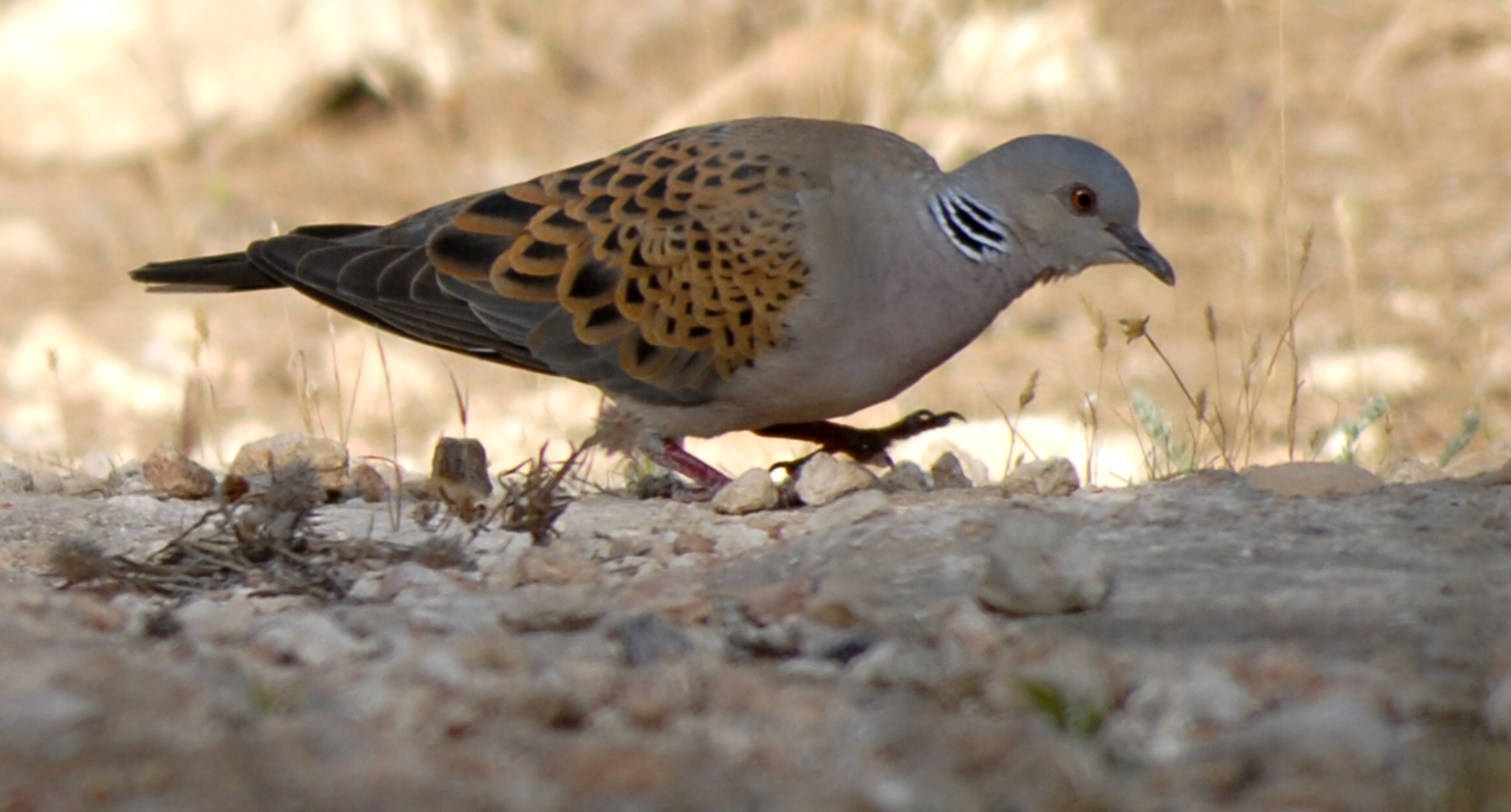
European turtle dove, Melilla

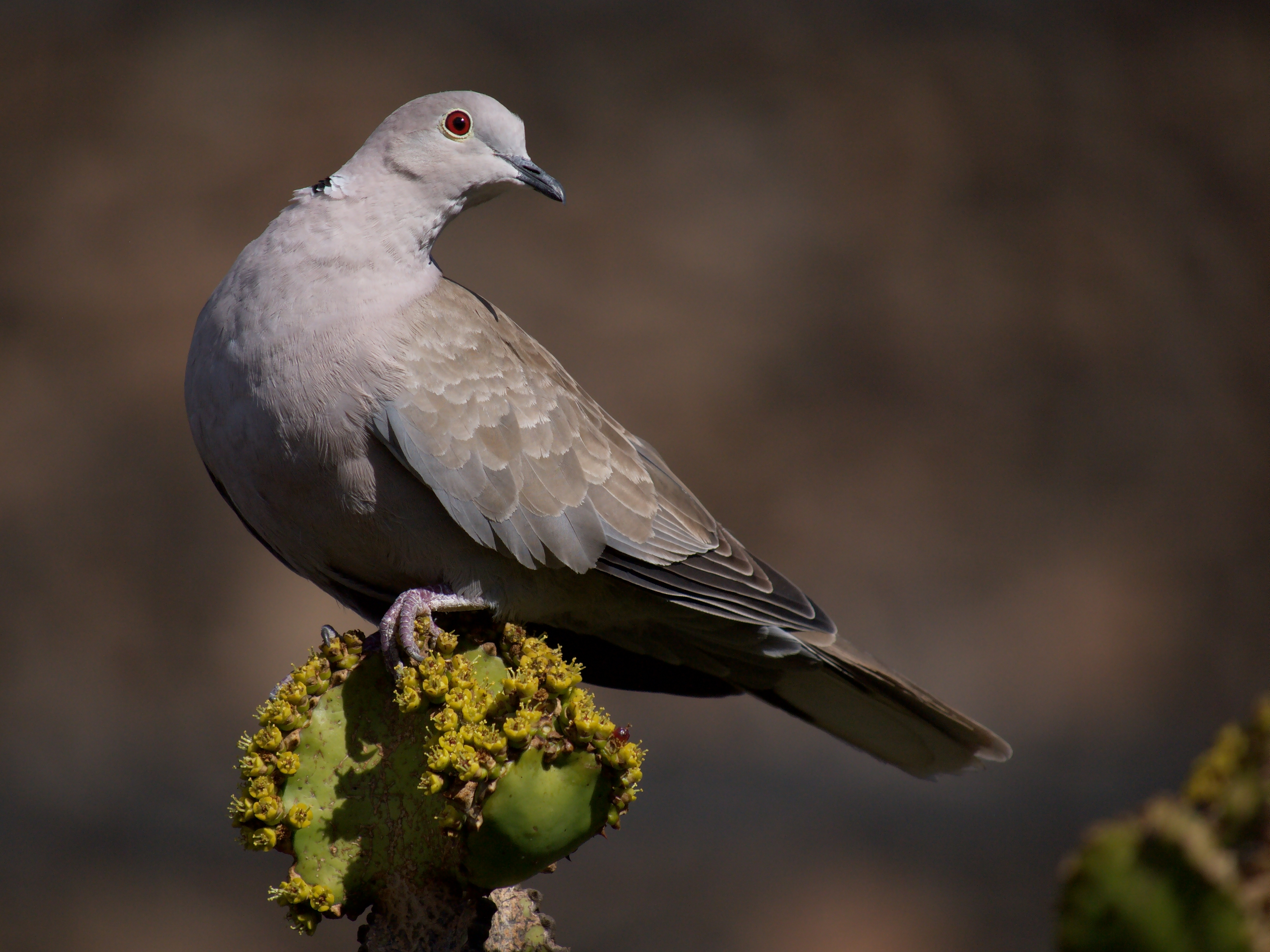
Eurasian collared dove, Guatiza, Lanzarote, Canary Islands

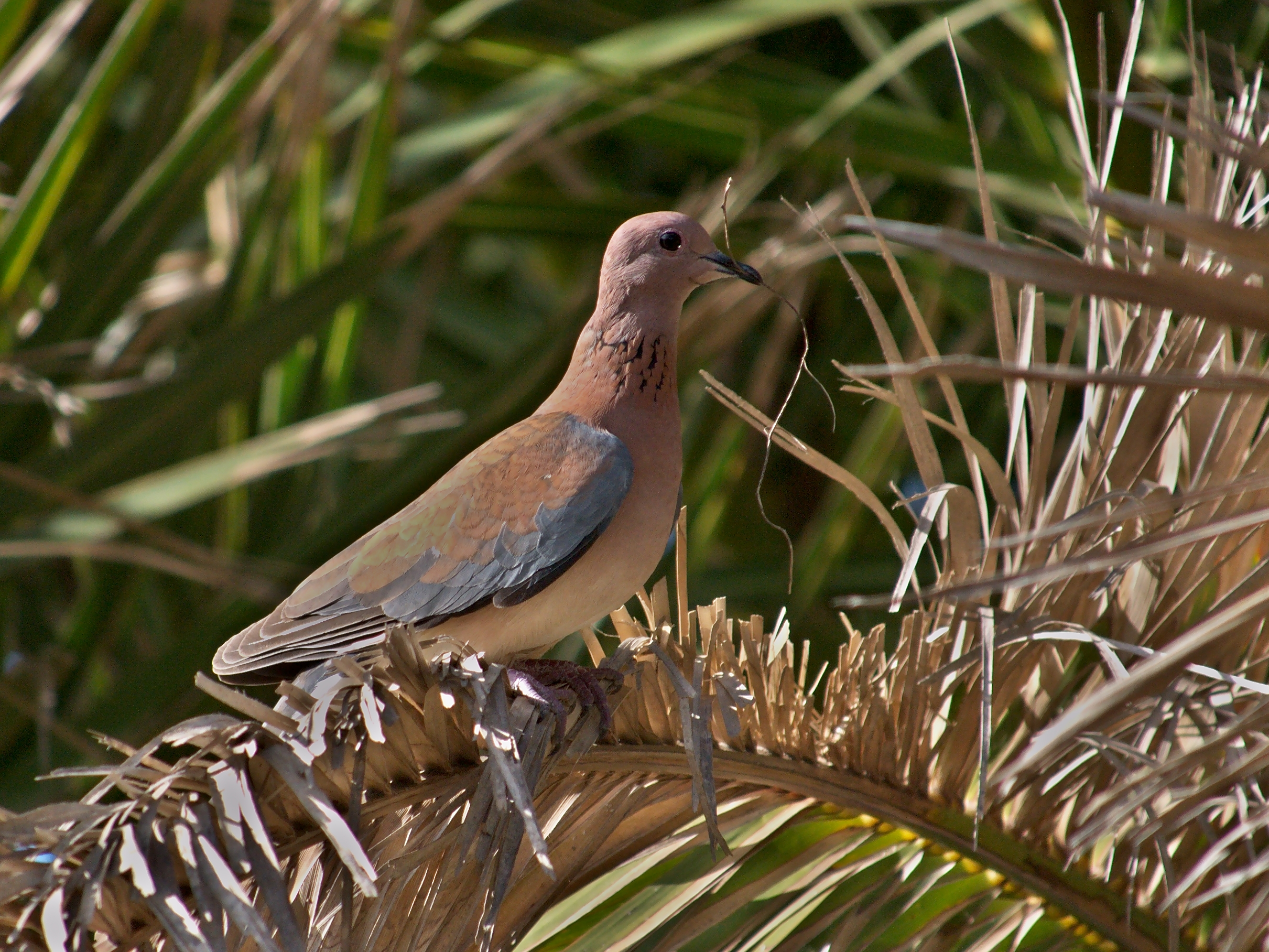
Laughing dove, Lanzarote, Canary Islands

== Rails, gallinules, and coots ==
Order: Gruiformes Family: Rallidae

Rallidae is a large family of small to medium-sized birds which includes the rails, crakes, coots and gallinules. Typically they inhabit dense vegetation in damp environments near lakes, swamps or rivers. In general they are shy and secretive birds, making them difficult to observe. Most species have strong legs and long toes which are well adapted to soft uneven surfaces. They tend to have short, rounded wings and to be weak fliers.

- Water rail (rascón europeo), Rallus aquaticus
- African crake (guión africano), Crecopsis egregia (R)
- Corn crake (guión de codornices), Crex crex (R)
- Sora (polluela sora), Porzana carolina (R)
- Spotted crake (polluela pintoja), Porzana porzana
- Lesser moorhen (gallineta chica), Paragallinula angulata (R)
- Common moorhen (gallineta común), Gallinula chloropus
- Eurasian coot (focha común), Fulica atra
- Red-knobbed coot (focha moruna), Fulica cristata
- American coot (focha americana), Fulica americana (R)
- Allen's gallinule (calamoncillo africano), Porphyrio alleni (R)
- Purple gallinule (calamoncillo americano), Porphyrio martinicus (R)
- Western swamphen (calamón común), Porphyrio porphyrio
- African swamphen (calamón africano), Porphyrio madagascariensis (R)
- Baillon's crake (polluela chica), Zapornia pusilla
- Little crake (polluela bastarda), Zapornia parva
- Striped crake (polluela culirroja), Aenigmatolimnas marginalis (R)
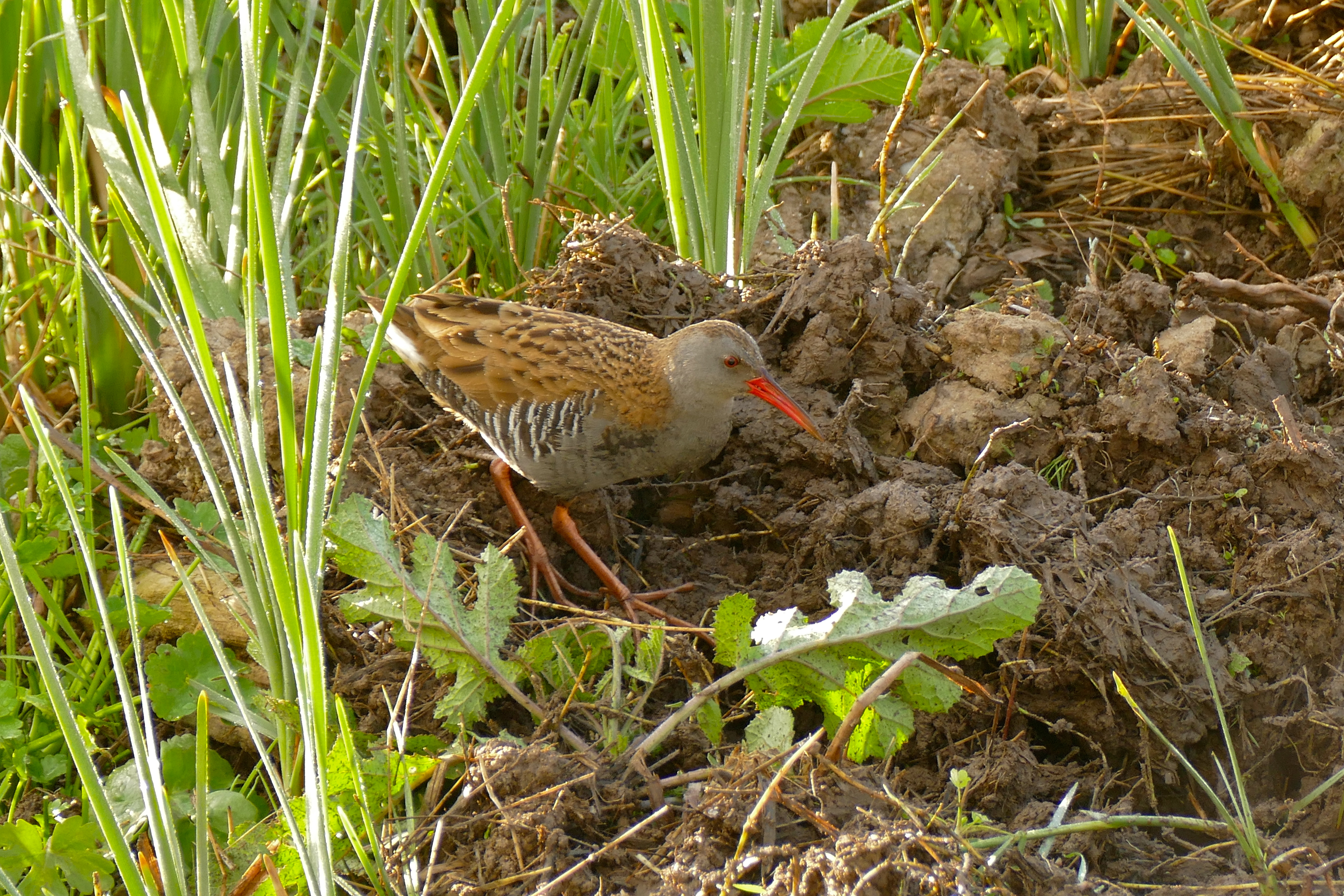
Water rail, Castelló d'Empúries, Catalonia

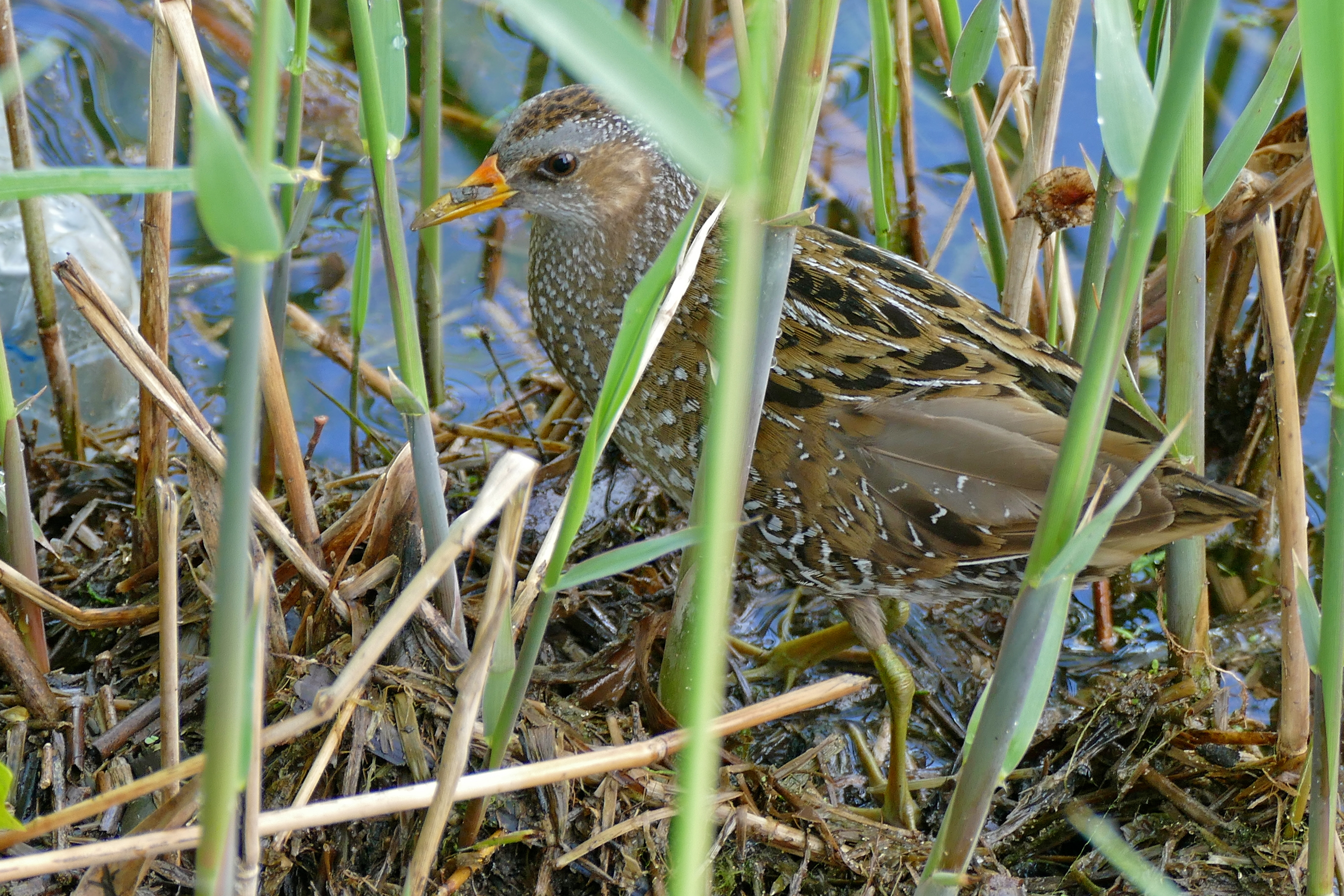
Spotted crake, Castelló d'Empúries, Catalonia

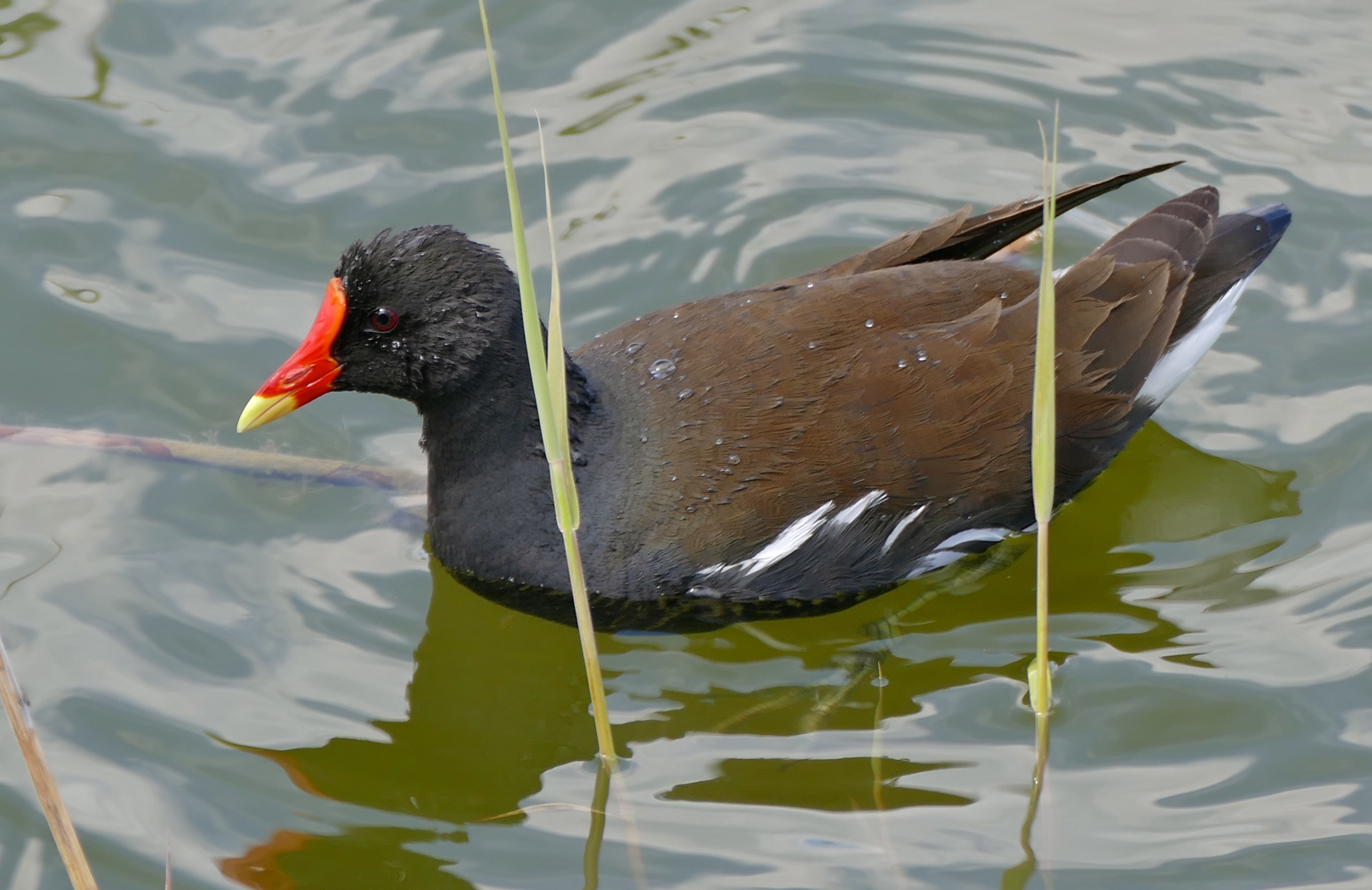
Common moorhen, Castelló d'Empúries, Catalonia

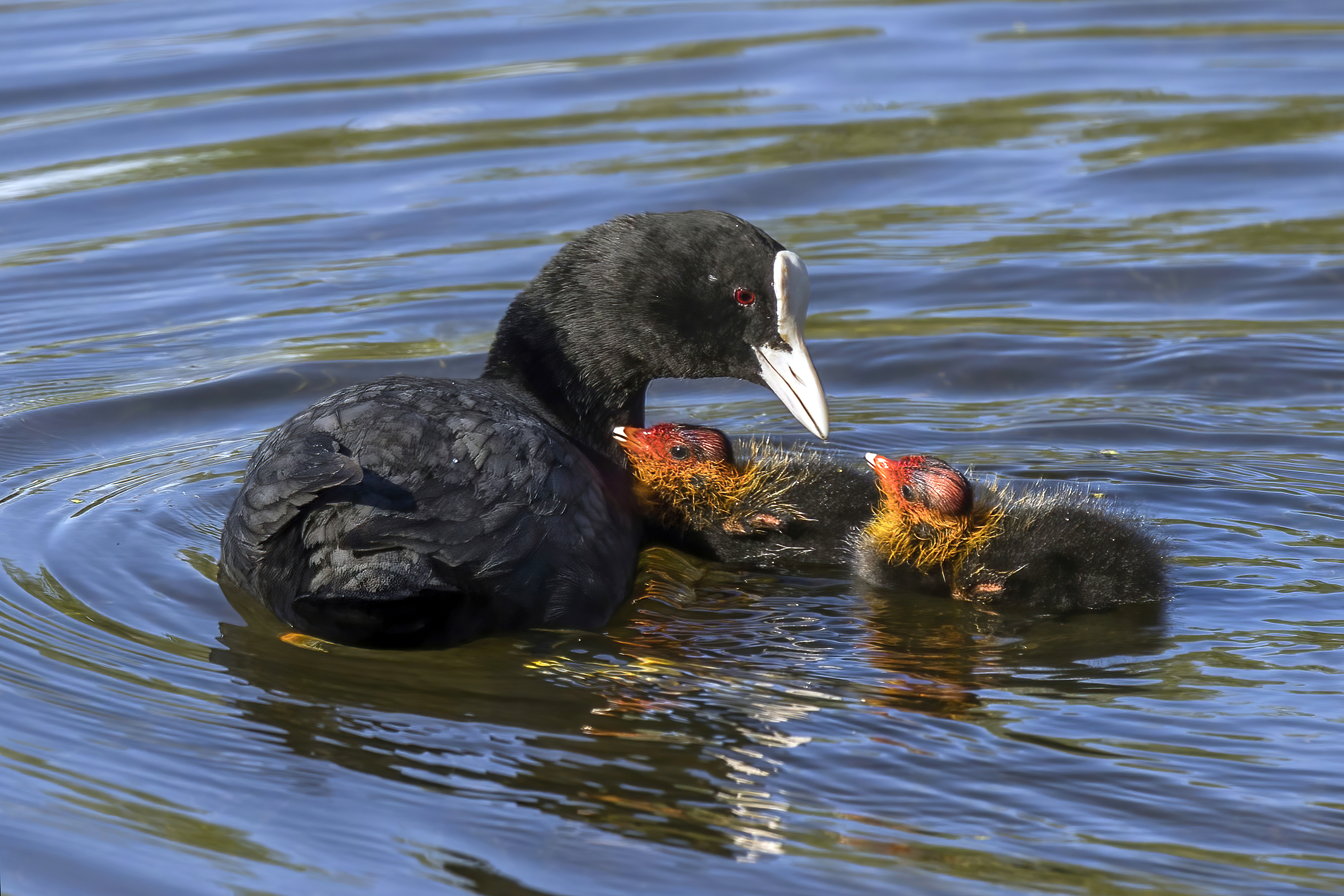
Eurasian coots, Estanque de San Lázaro, Trujillo, Extremadura

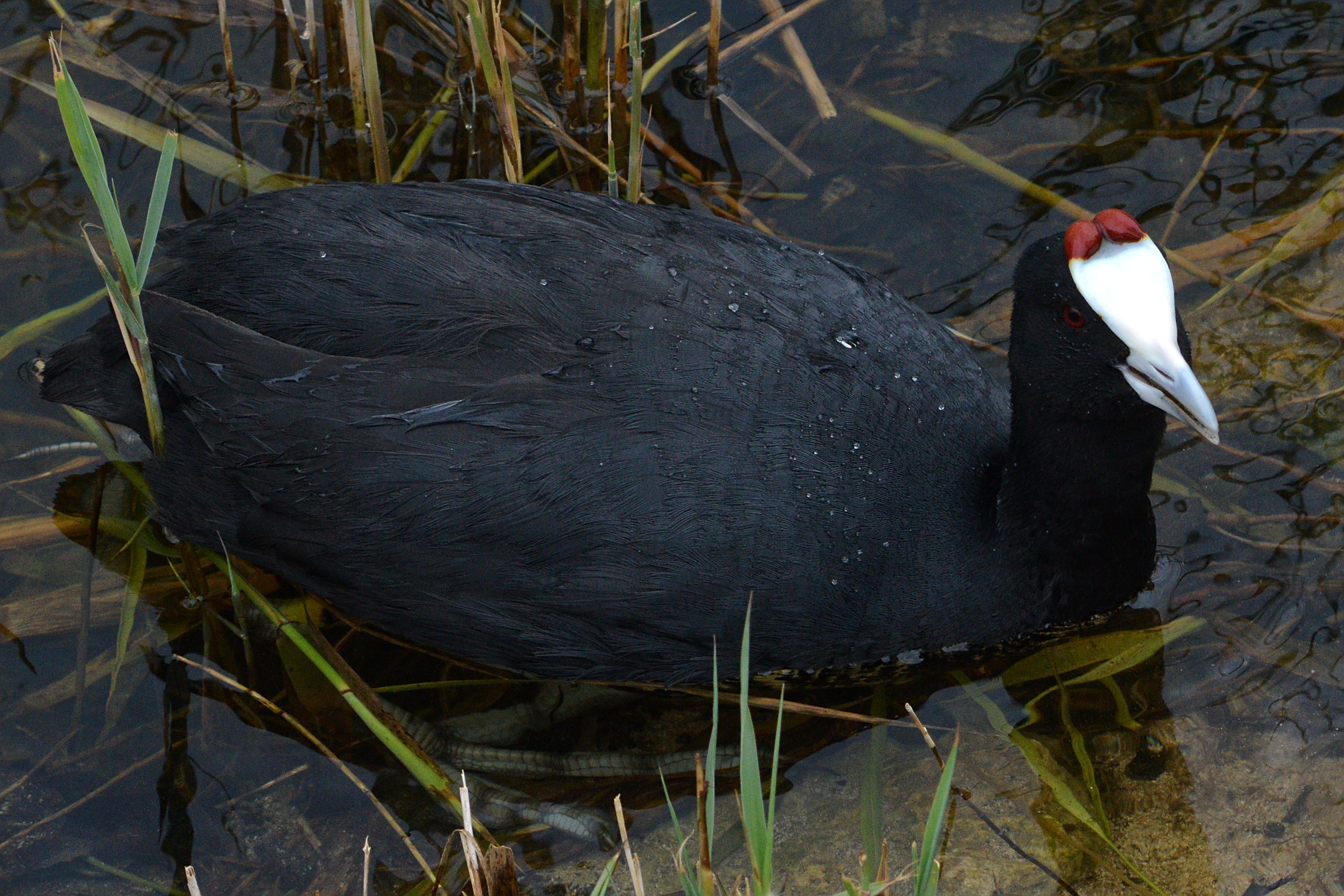
Red-knobbed coot, Albufera Natural Park

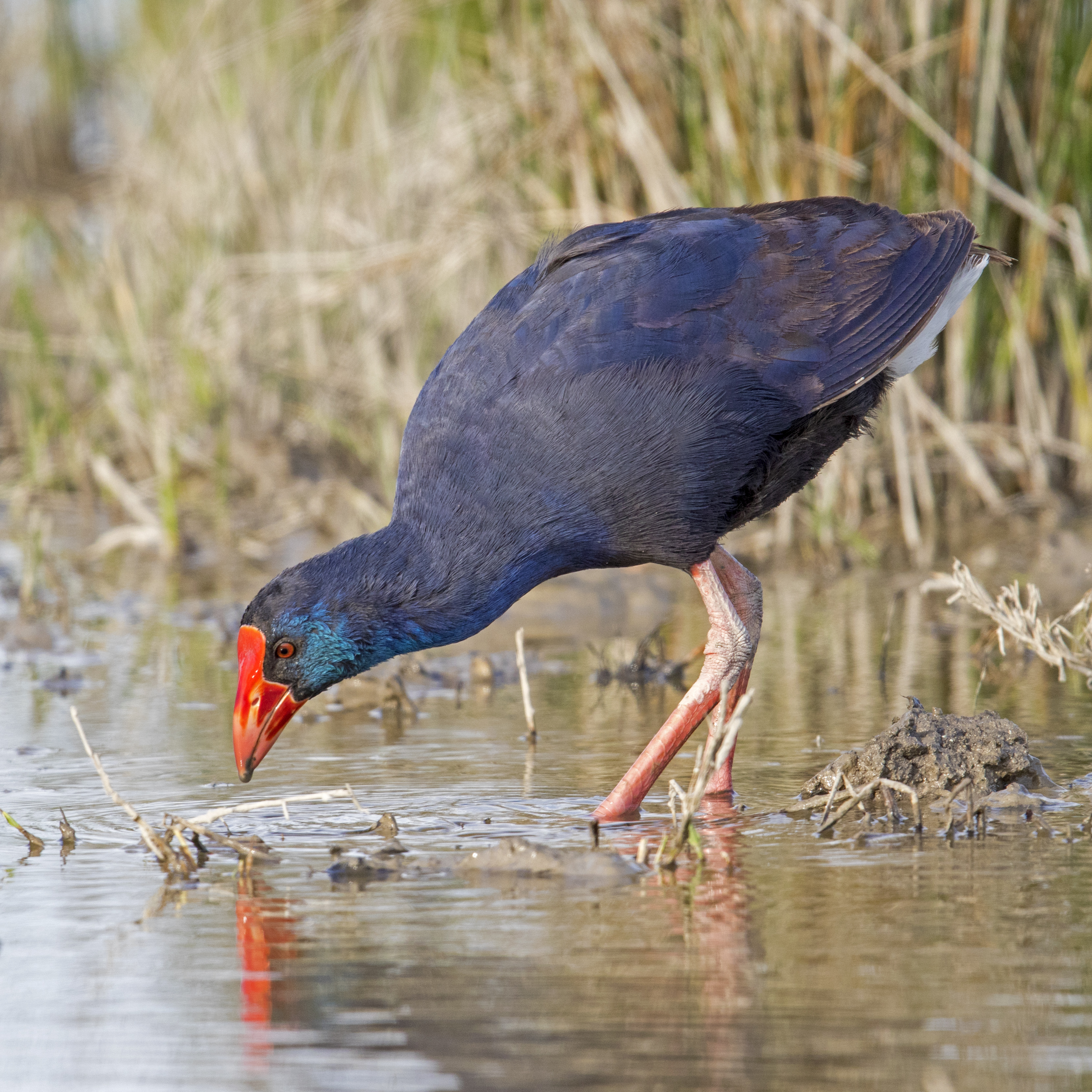
Western swamphen, Mallorca

== Cranes ==
Order: Gruiformes Family: Gruidae

Cranes are large, long-legged and long-necked birds. Unlike the similar-looking but unrelated herons, cranes fly with necks outstretched, not pulled back. Most have elaborate and noisy courting displays or "dances".

- Sandhill crane (grulla canadiense), Antigone canadensis (R)
- Demoiselle crane (grulla damisela), Grus virgo (B R)
- Common crane (grulla común), Grus grus
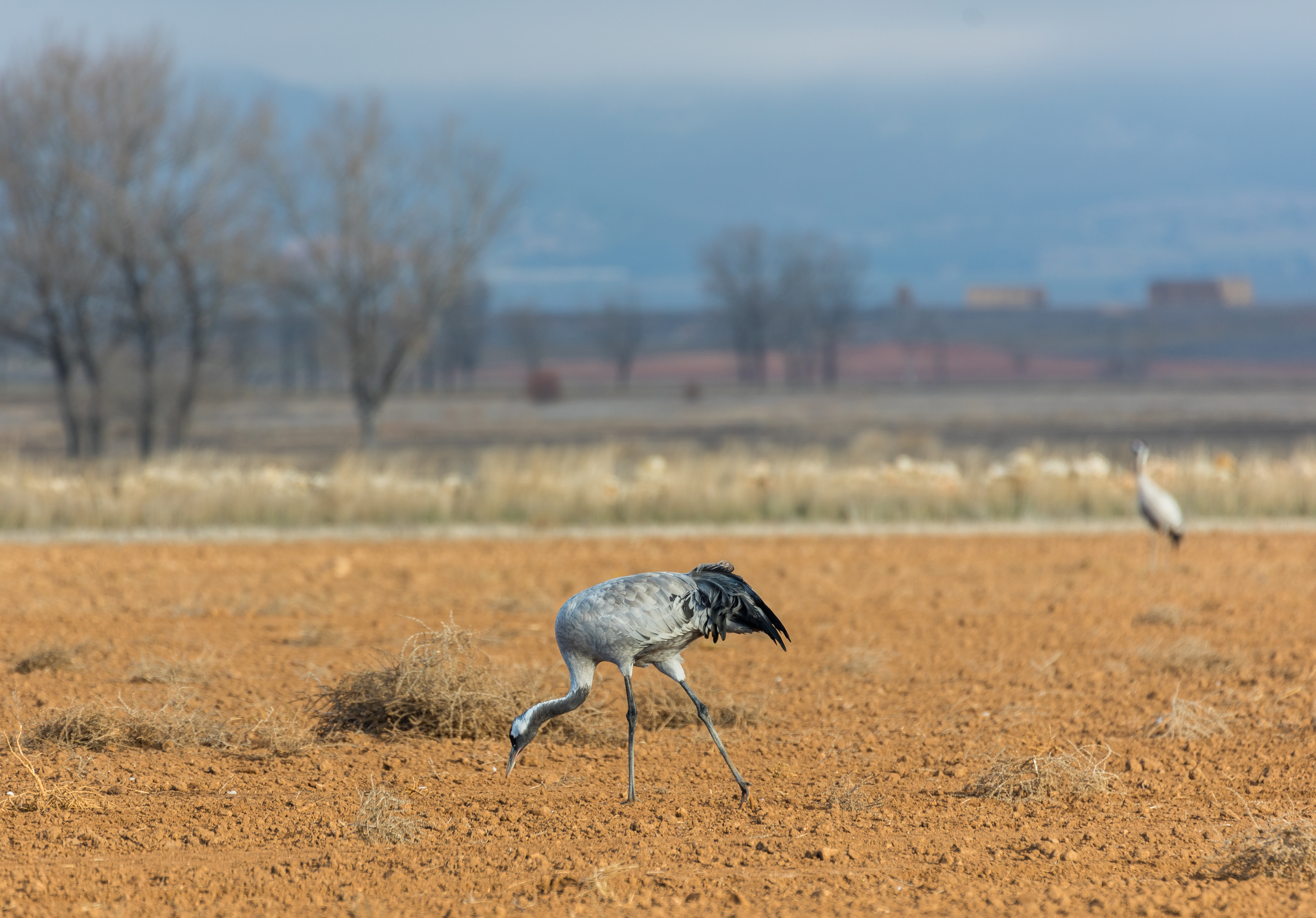
Common cranes, Las Cuerlas, Teruel

== Grebes ==
Order: Podicipediformes Family: Podicipedidae

Grebes are small to medium-large freshwater diving birds. They have lobed toes and are excellent swimmers and divers. However, they have their feet placed far back on the body, making them quite ungainly on land.

- Little grebe (zampullín común), Tachybaptus ruficollis
- Pied-billed grebe (zampullín picogrueso), Podilymbus podiceps (R)
- Red-necked grebe (somormujo cuellirrojo), Podiceps grisegena (R)
- Great crested grebe (somormujo lavanco), Podiceps cristatus
- Slavonian grebe (zampullín cuellirrojo), Podiceps auritus vulnerable
- Black-necked grebe (zampullín cuellinegro), Podiceps nigricollis
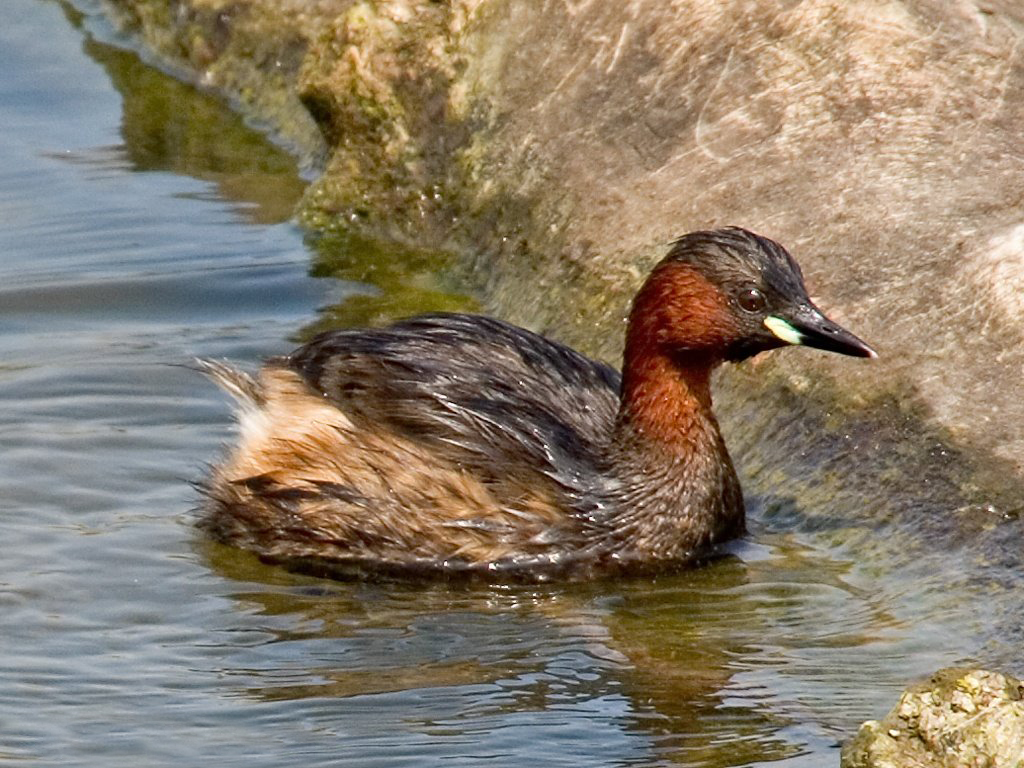
Little grebe, Catalonia

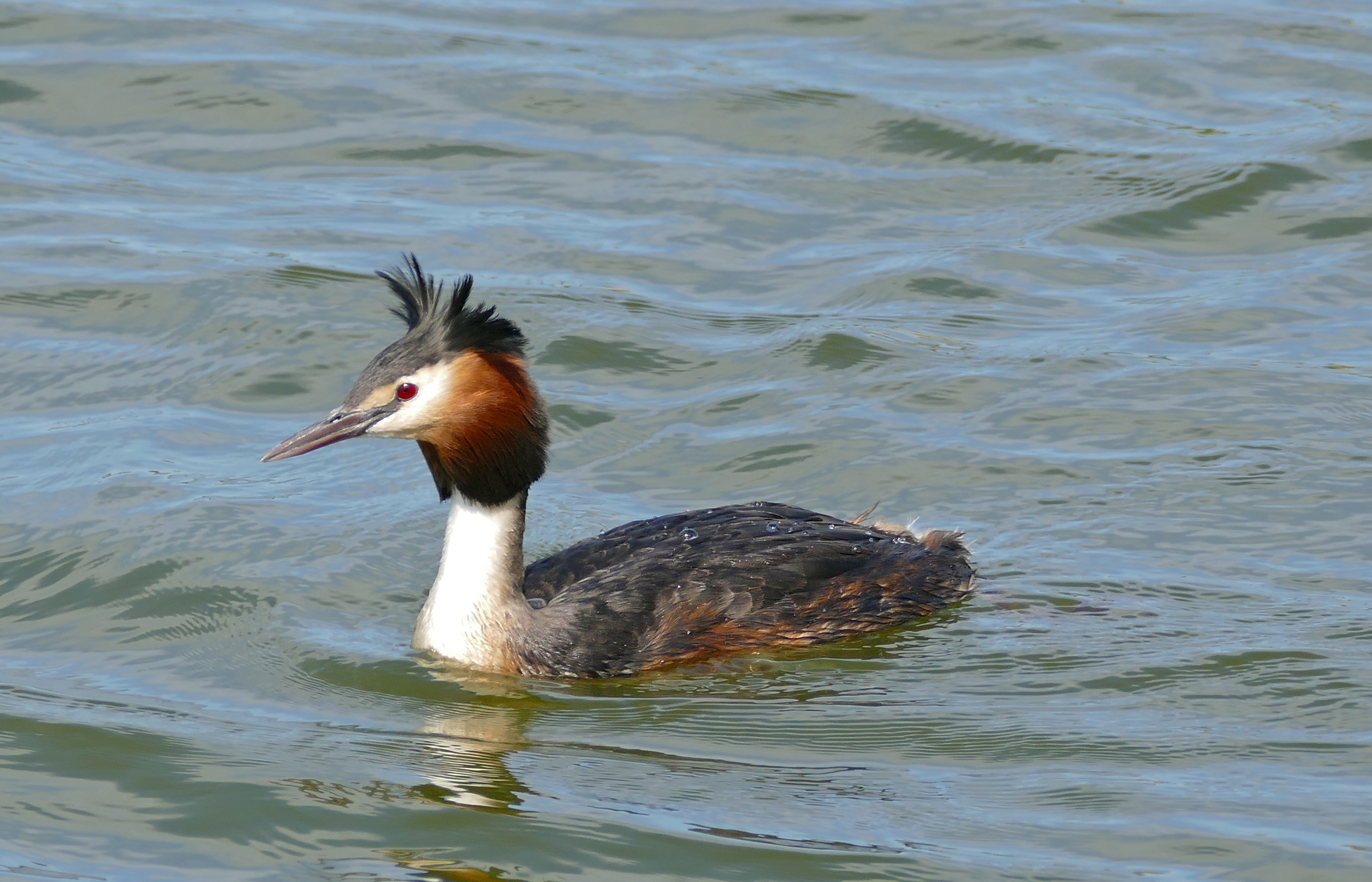
Great crested grebe, Castelló d'Empúries, Catalonia

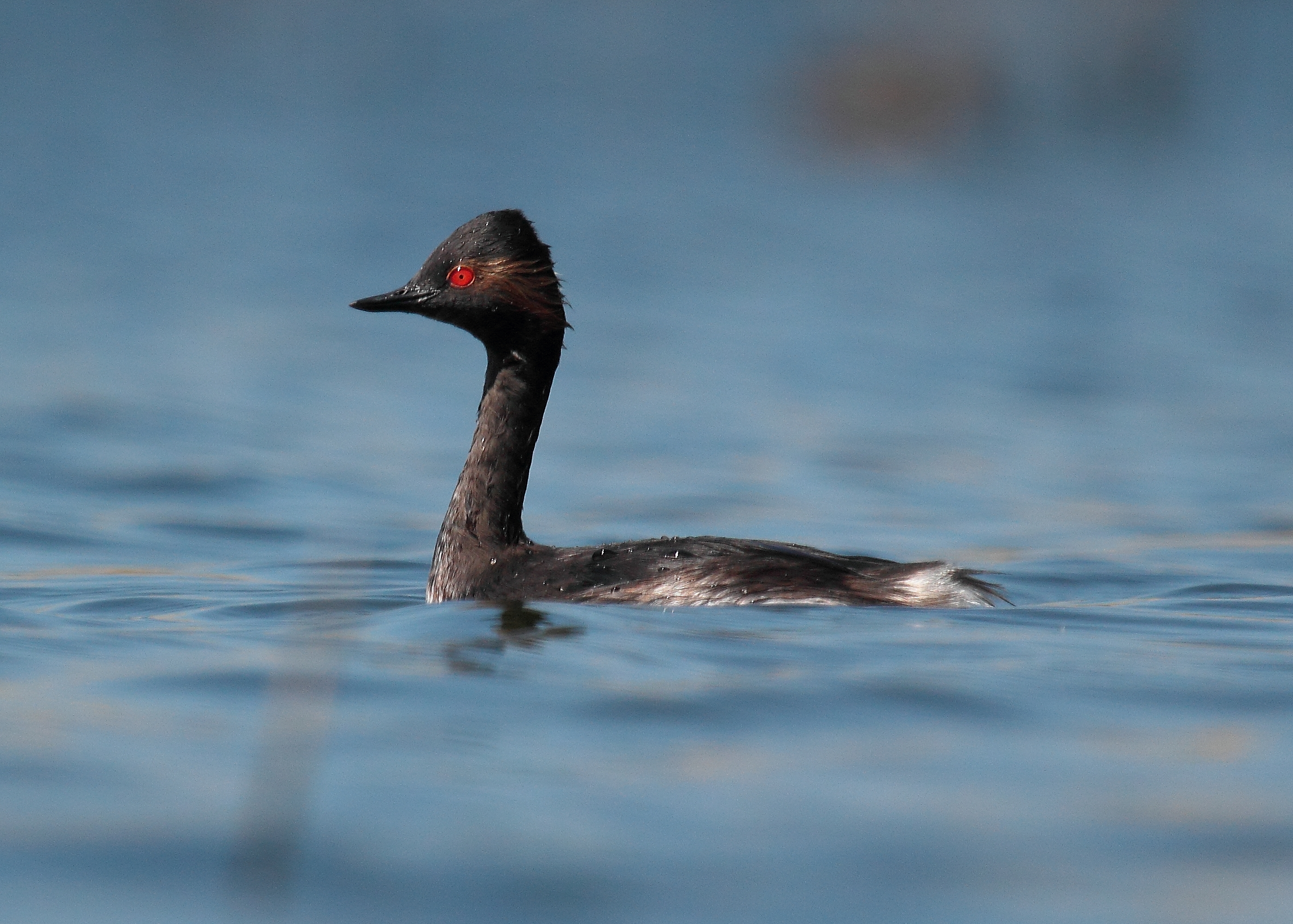
Black-necked grebe, El Puerto de Santa María, Andalusia

== Flamingos ==
Order: Phoenicopteriformes Family: Phoenicopteridae

Flamingos are gregarious wading birds, usually 1 to 1.5 metres (3.3 to 4.9 ft) tall, found in both the Western and eastern Hemispheres. Flamingos filter-feed on shrimps and algae. Their oddly shaped beaks are specially adapted to separate mud and silt from the food they consume and, uniquely, are used upside-down.

- Greater flamingo (flamenco común), Phoenicopterus roseus
- Lesser flamingo (flamenco enano), Phoeniconaias minor
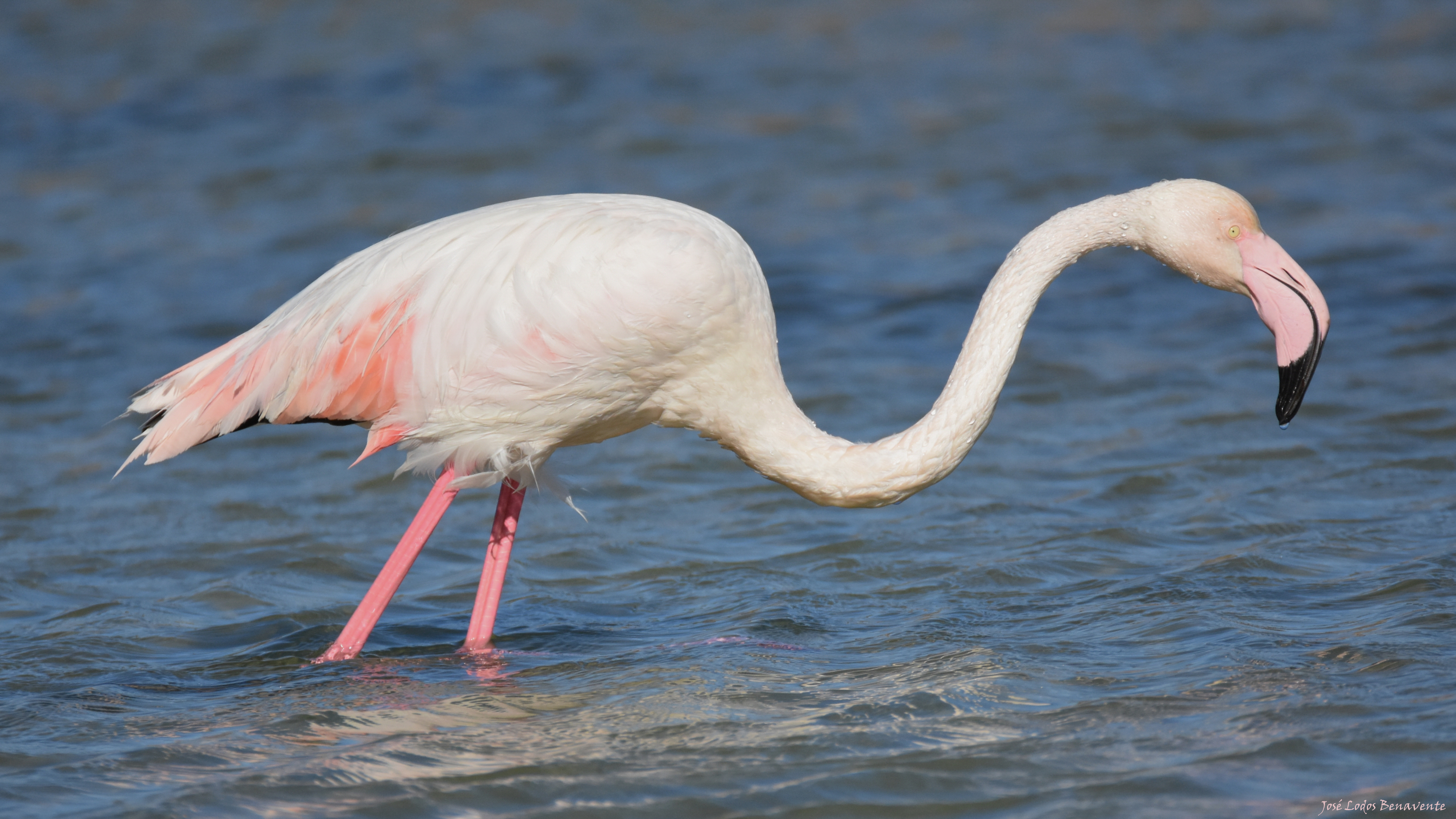
Greater flamingo, Las Salinas Natural Park, Ibiza

== Buttonquail ==
Order: Charadriiformes Family: Turnicidae

The buttonquail are small, drab, running birds which resemble the true quails. The female is the brighter of the sexes and initiates courtship. The male incubates the eggs and tends the young.

- Common buttonquail (torillo andaluz), Turnix sylvaticus (Ex)

== Stone-curlews and thick-knees ==
Order: Charadriiformes Family: Burhinidae

The stone-curlews and thick-knees are a group of largely tropical waders in the family Burhinidae. They are found worldwide within the tropical zone, with some species also breeding in temperate Europe and Australia. They are medium to large waders with strong black or yellow-black bills, large yellow eyes and cryptic plumage. Despite being classed as waders, most species have a preference for arid or semi-arid habitats.

- Eurasian stone-curlew (alcaraván común), Burhinus oedicnemus
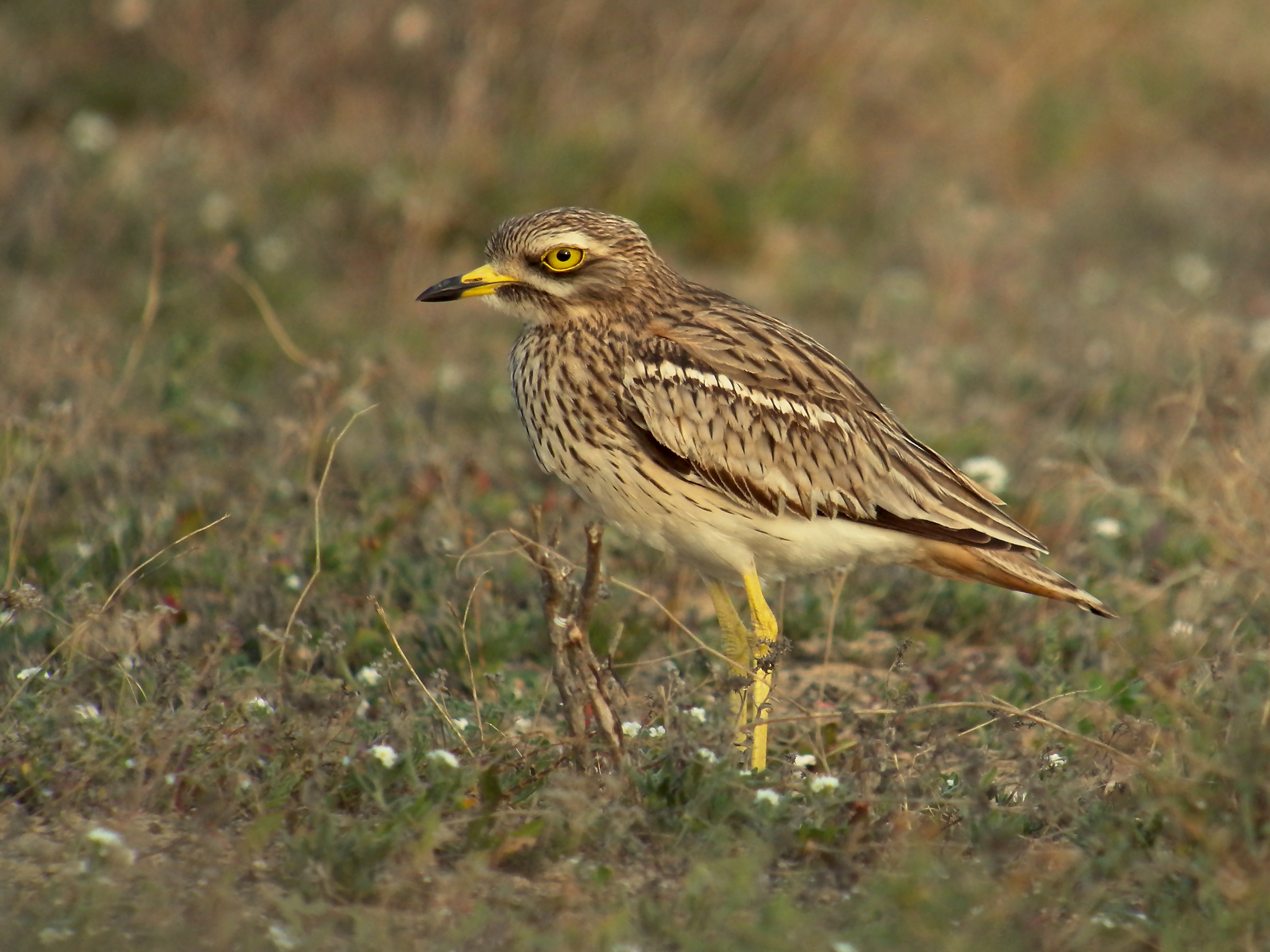
Eurasian stone-curlew, Lanzarote, Canary Islands

== Oystercatchers ==
Order: Charadriiformes Family: Haematopodidae

The oystercatchers are large and noisy plover-like birds, with strong bills used for smashing or prising open molluscs. They are long-lived birds, with some species known to live in excess of 40 years.

- Canary Islands oystercatcher (ostrero negro canario), Haematopus meadewaldoi (E – Canary Islands; extinct)
- Eurasian oystercatcher (ostrero euroasiático), Haematopus ostralegus
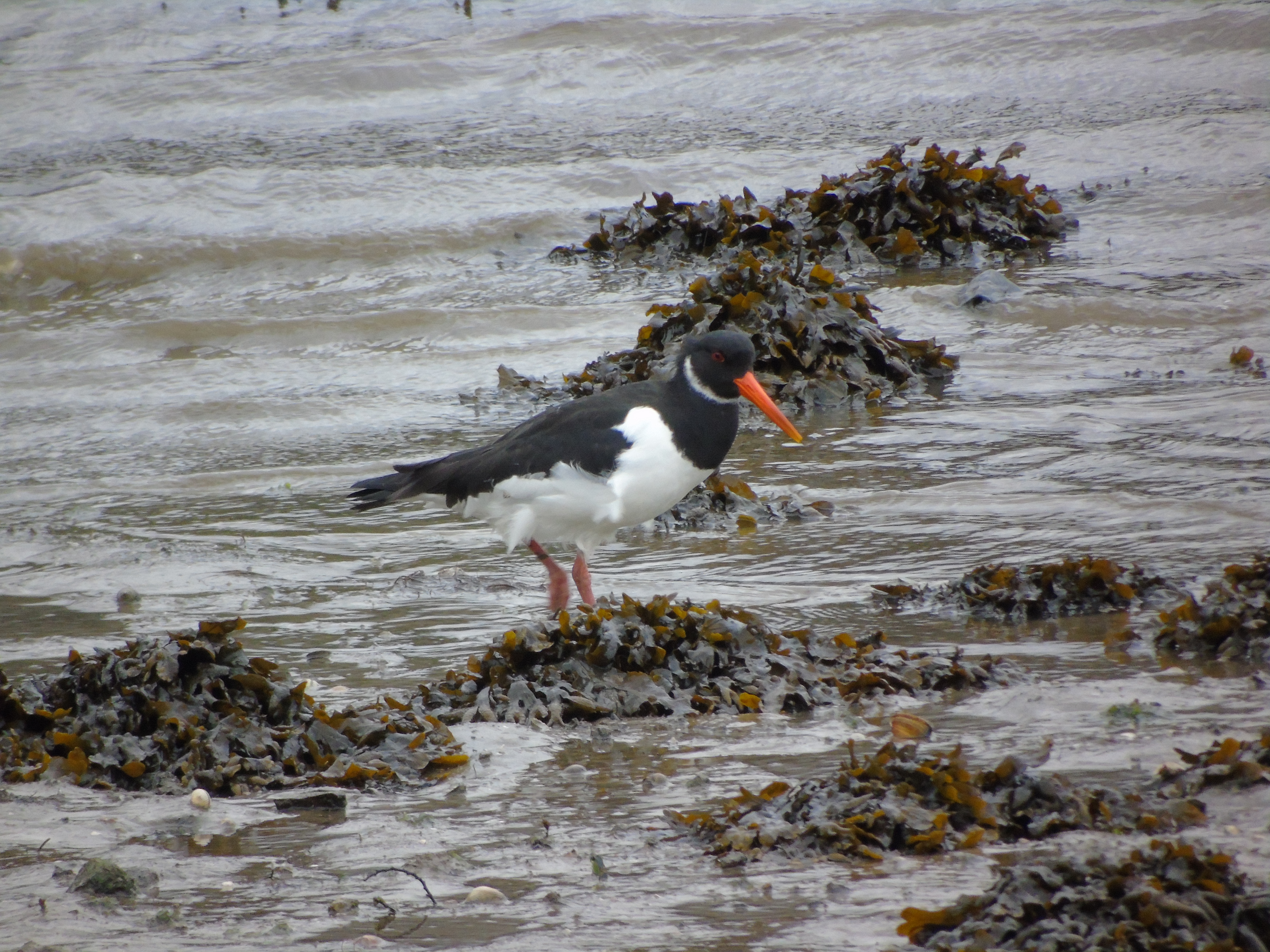
Eurasian oystercatcher, Santa Cristina, Oleiros, A Coruña, Galicia

== Stilts and avocets ==
Order: Charadriiformes Family: Recurvirostridae

Recurvirostridae is a family of large wading birds, which includes the stilts and avocets. The avocets have long legs and long up-curved bills. The stilts have extremely long legs and long, thin, straight bills.

- Black-winged stilt (cigüeñuela común), Himantopus himantopus
- Pied avocet (avoceta común), Recurvirostra avosetta
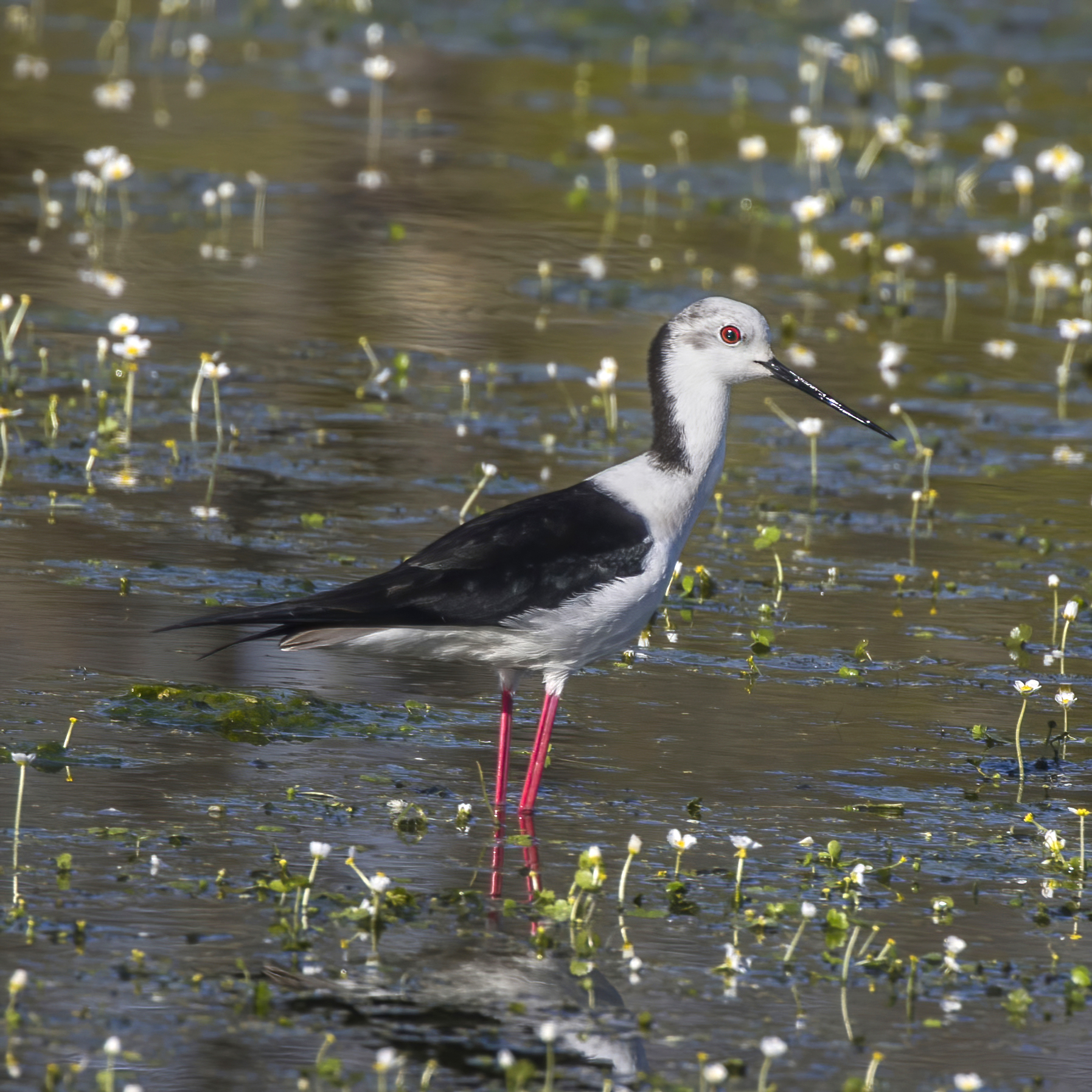
Black-winged stilt, Spain

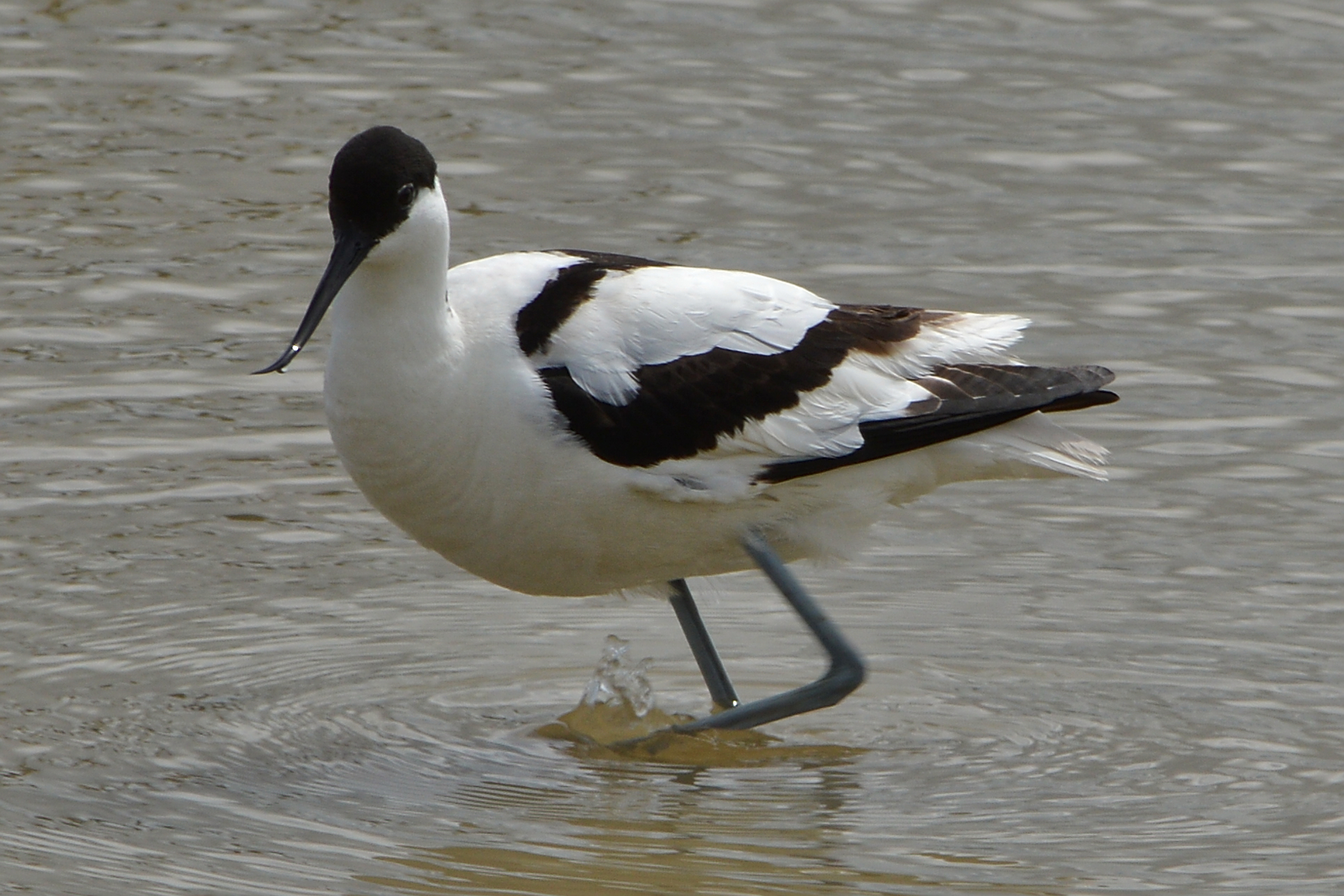
Pied avocet, Albufera Natural Park

== Plovers and lapwings ==
Order: Charadriiformes Family: Charadriidae

The family Charadriidae includes the plovers, dotterels and lapwings. They are small to medium-sized birds with compact bodies, short, thick necks and long, usually pointed, wings. They are found in open country worldwide, mostly in habitats near water.

- Northern lapwing (avefría europea), Vanellus vanellus
- Sociable lapwing (avefría sociable), Vanellus gregarius (R)
- White-tailed lapwing (avefría coliblanca), Vanellus leucurus (R)
- European golden plover (chorlito dorado europeo), Pluvialis apricaria
- Pacific golden plover (chorlito dorado siberiano), Pluvialis fulva (R)
- American golden plover (chorlito dorado americano), Pluvialis dominica (R)
- Grey plover (chorlito gris), Pluvialis squatarola
- Common ringed plover (chorlitejo grande), Charadrius hiaticula
- Semipalmated plover (chorlitejo semipalmeado), Charadrius semipalmatus (R)
- Little ringed plover (chorlitejo chico), Charadrius dubius
- Killdeer (chorlitejo culirrojo), Charadrius vociferus (R)
- Kittlitz's plover (chorlitejo pecuario), Anarhynchus pecuarius (R)
- Kentish plover (chorlitejo patinegro), Anarhynchus alexandrinus
- Lesser sand plover (chorlitejo mongol chico), Anarhynchus mongolus (R)
- Greater sand plover (chorlitejo mongol grande), Anarhynchus leschenaultii (R)
- Eurasian dotterel (chorlito carambolo), Eudromias morinellus
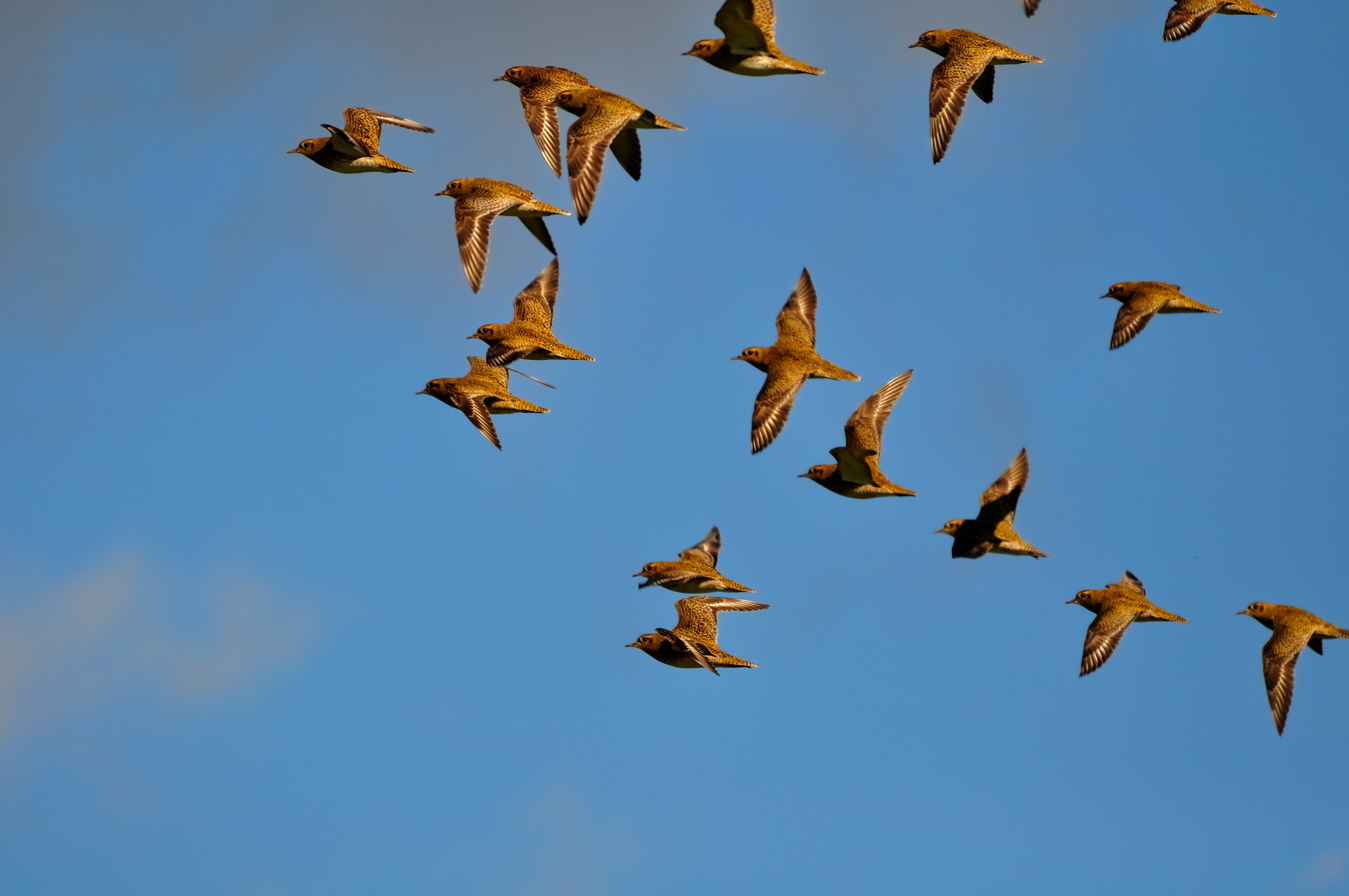
European golden plovers, Spain

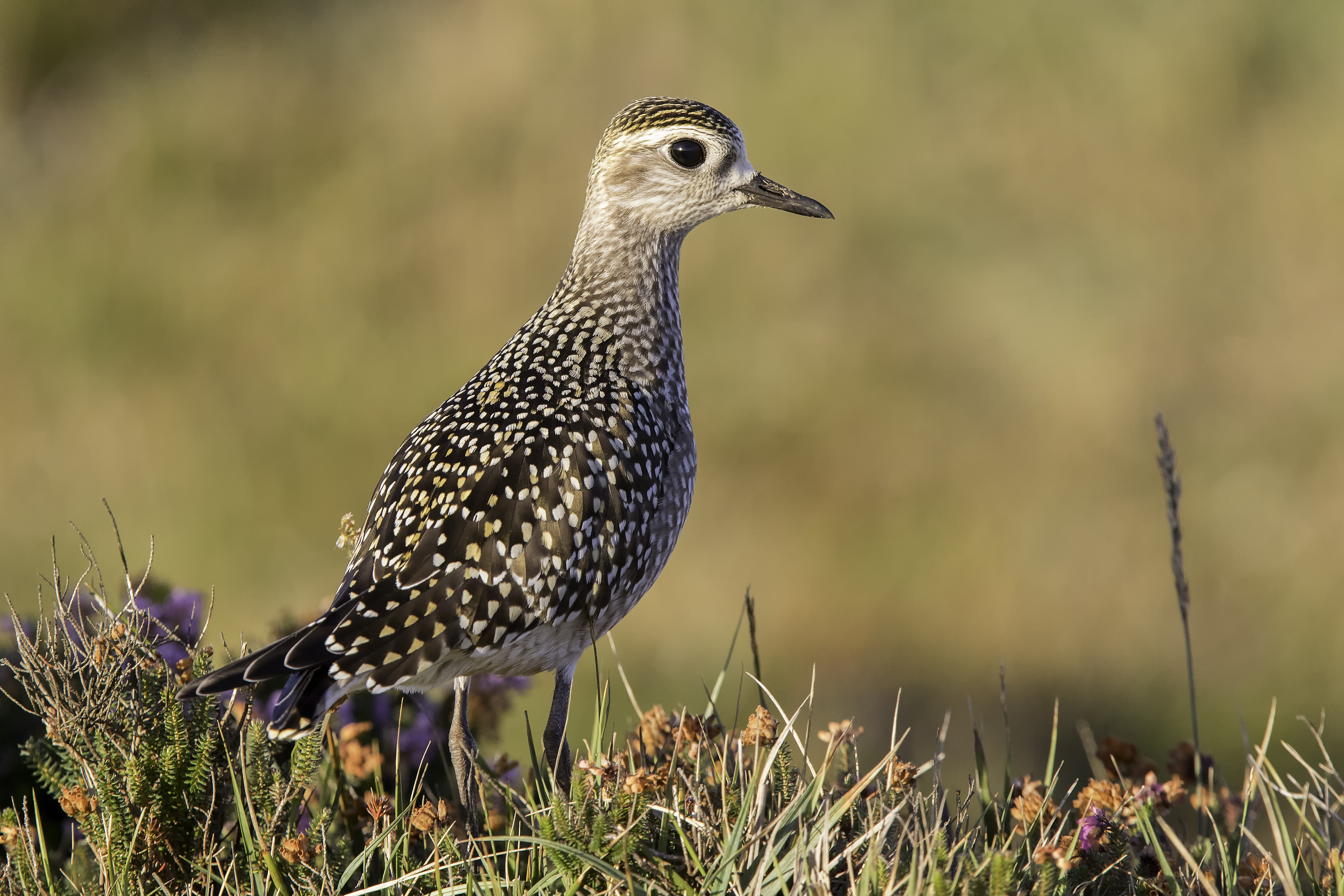
American golden plover, Sierra de la Capelada, A Coruña, Galicia

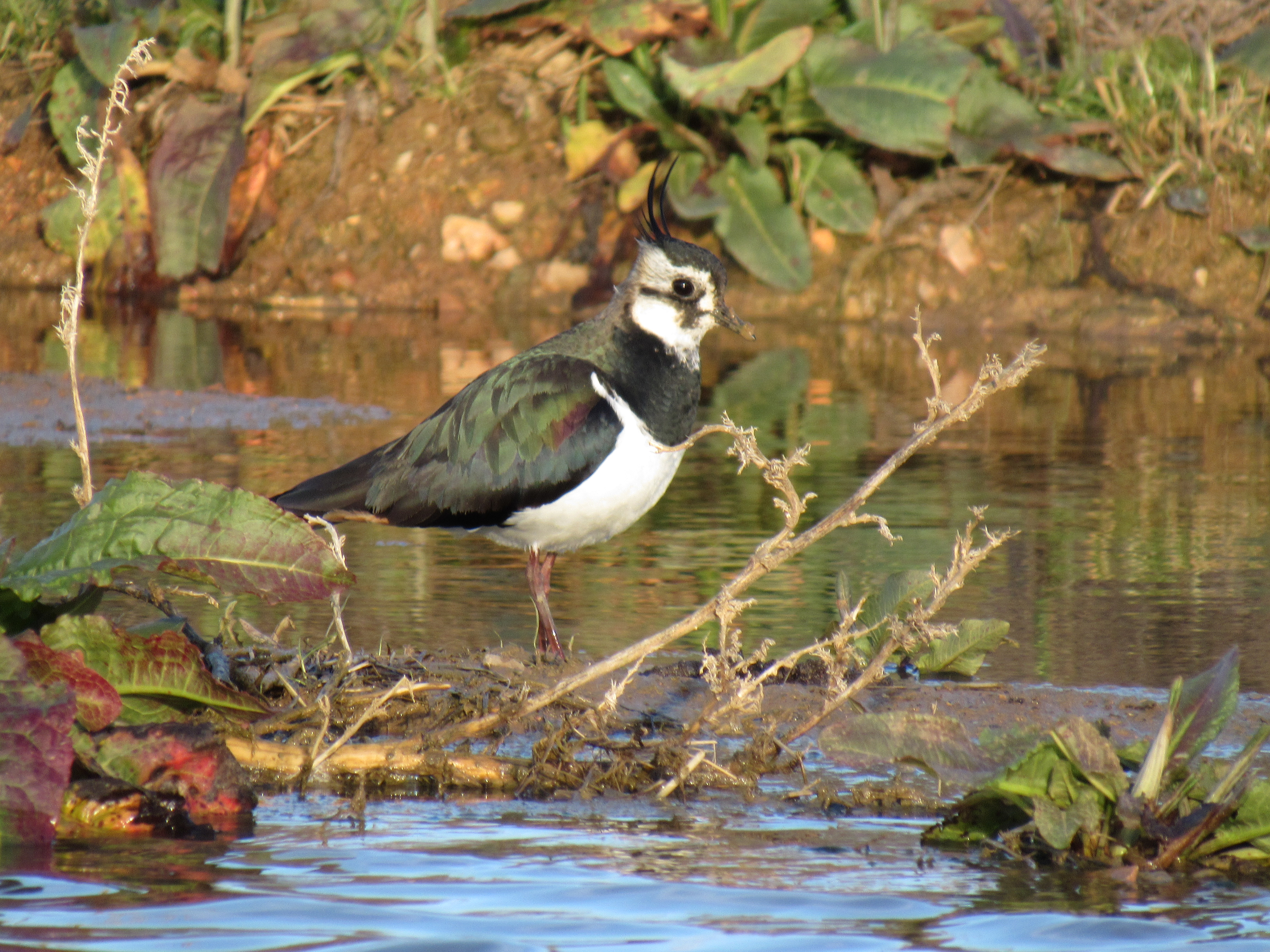
Northern lapwing, Lagunas Manchegas

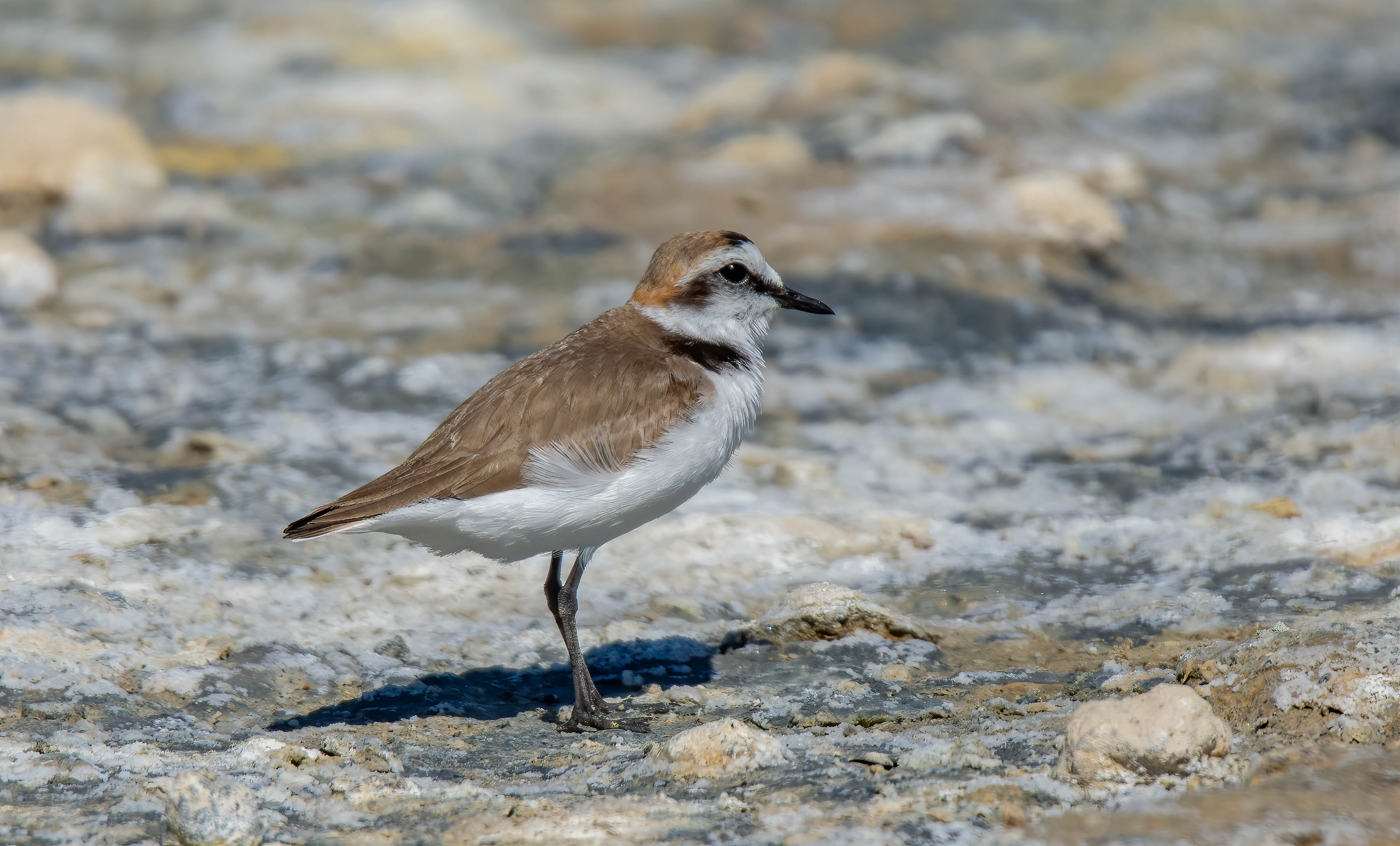
Kentish plover, southern Spain

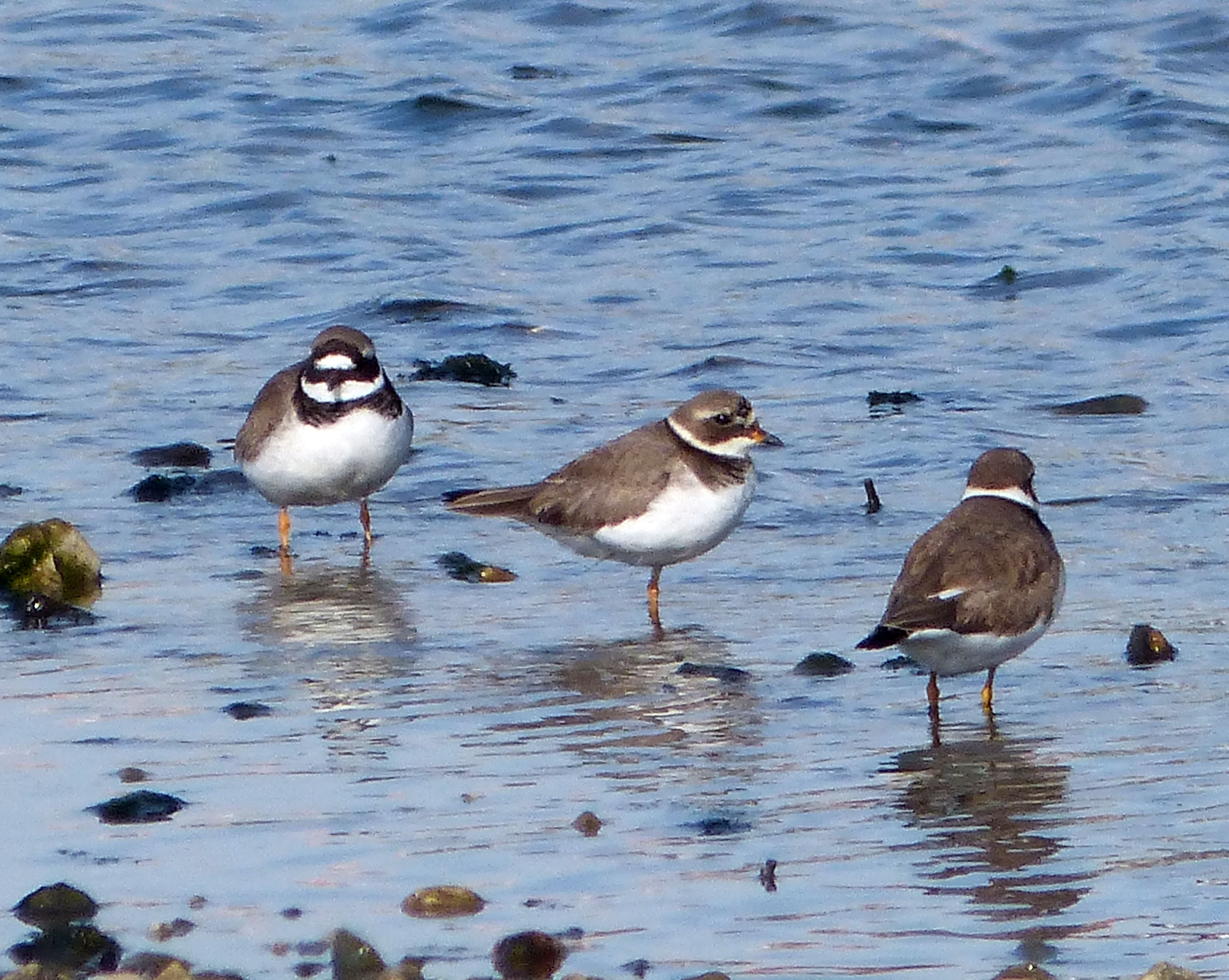
Common ringed plovers, Estuario de Río Guadiaro, near Sotogrande

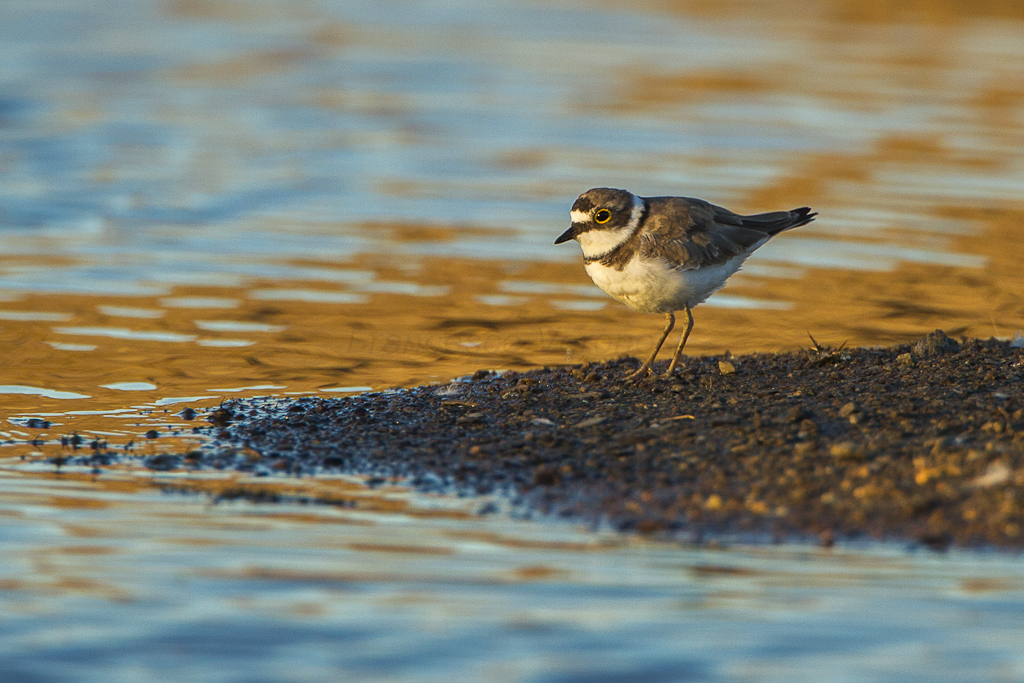
Little ringed plover, Castuera, Extremadura

== Egyptian plover ==
Order: Charadriiformes Family: Pluvianidae

The Egyptian plover is found across equatorial Africa and along the Nile River.

- Egyptian plover (pluvial), Pluvianus aegyptius (B, Canary Islands)

== Sandpipers and allies ==
Order: Charadriiformes Family: Scolopacidae

Scolopacidae is a large diverse family of small to medium-sized shorebirds including the sandpipers, curlews, godwits, shanks, tattlers, woodcocks, snipes, dowitchers and phalaropes. The majority of these species eat small invertebrates picked out of the mud or soil. Variation in length of legs and bills enables multiple species to feed in the same habitat, particularly on the coast, without direct competition for food.

- Upland sandpiper (correlimos batitú), Bartramia longicauda (R)
- Eurasian whimbrel (zarapito trinador), Numenius phaeopus
- Hudsonian whimbrel (zarapito de Hudson), Numenius hudsonicus (R)
- Slender-billed curlew (zarapito fino), Numenius tenuirostris (B R)
- Eurasian curlew (zarapito real), Numenius arquata
- Bar-tailed godwit (aguja colipinta), Limosa lapponica
- Black-tailed godwit (aguja colinegra), Limosa limosa
- Ruddy turnstone (vuelvepiedras común), Arenaria interpres
- Great knot (correlimos grande), Calidris tenuirostris (R)
- Red knot (correlimos gordo), Calidris canutus
- Ruff (combatiente), Calidris pugnax
- Broad-billed sandpiper (correlimos falcinelo), Calidris falcinellus (R)
- Sharp-tailed sandpiper (correlimos acuminado), Calidris acuminata (R)
- Stilt sandpiper (correlimos zancolín), Calidris himantopus (R)
- Curlew sandpiper (correlimos zarapitín), Calidris ferruginea
- Temminck's stint (correlimos de Temminck), Calidris temminckii
- Red-necked stint (correlimos cuellirrojo), Calidris ruficollis (R)
- Sanderling (correlimos tridáctilo), Calidris alba
- Dunlin (correlimos común), Calidris alpina
- Purple sandpiper (correlimos oscuro), Calidris maritima
- Baird's sandpiper (correlimos de Baird), Calidris bairdii (R)
- Little stint (correlimos menudo), Calidris minuta
- Least sandpiper (correlimos menudillo), Calidris minutilla (R)
- White-rumped sandpiper (correlimos culiblanco), Calidris fuscicollis (R)
- Buff-breasted sandpiper (correlimos canelo), Calidris subruficollis
- Pectoral sandpiper (correlimos pectoral), Calidris melanotos
- Semipalmated sandpiper (correlimos semipalmeado), Calidris pusilla (R)
- Western sandpiper (correlimos de Alaska), Calidris mauri (R)
- Long-billed dowitcher (agujeta escolopácea), Limnodromus scolopaceus (R)
- Short-billed dowitcher (agujeta gris), Limnodromus griseus (R)
- Eurasian woodcock (chocha perdiz), Scolopax rusticola
- Jack snipe (agachadiza chica), Lymnocryptes minimus
- Great snipe (agachadiza real), Gallinago media (R)
- Common snipe (agachadiza común), Gallinago gallinago
- Wilson's snipe (agachadiza de Wilson), Gallinago delicata (R)
- Terek sandpiper (andarríos del Terek), Xenus cinereus (R)
- Wilson's phalarope (falaropo tricolor), Phalaropus tricolor (R)
- Red-necked phalarope (falaropo picofino), Phalaropus lobatus
- Red phalarope (falaropo picogrueso), Phalaropus fulicarius
- Common sandpiper (andarríos chico), Actitis hypoleucos
- Spotted sandpiper (andarríos maculado), Actitis macularius (R)
- Green sandpiper (andarríos grande), Tringa ochropus
- Solitary sandpiper (andarríos solitario), Tringa solitaria (R)
- Lesser yellowlegs (archibebe patigualdo chico), Tringa flavipes (R)
- Common redshank (archibebe común), Tringa totanus
- Marsh sandpiper (archibebe fino), Tringa stagnatilis
- Wood sandpiper (andarríos bastardo), Tringa glareola
- Spotted redshank (archibebe oscuro), Tringa erythropus
- Common greenshank (archibebe claro), Tringa nebularia
- Greater yellowlegs (archibebe patigualdo grande), Tringa melanoleuca (R)
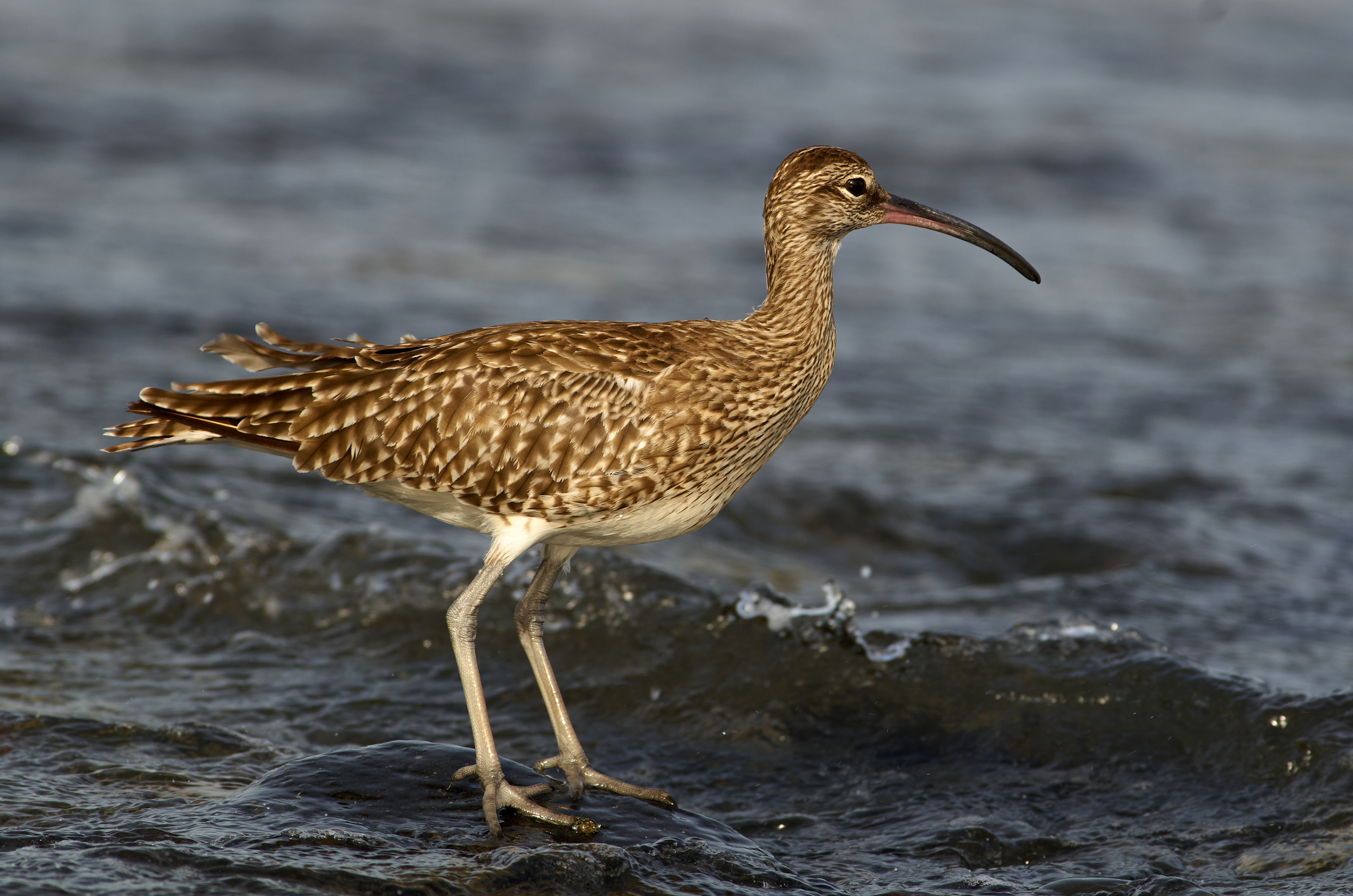
Eurasian whimbrel, Fuerteventura

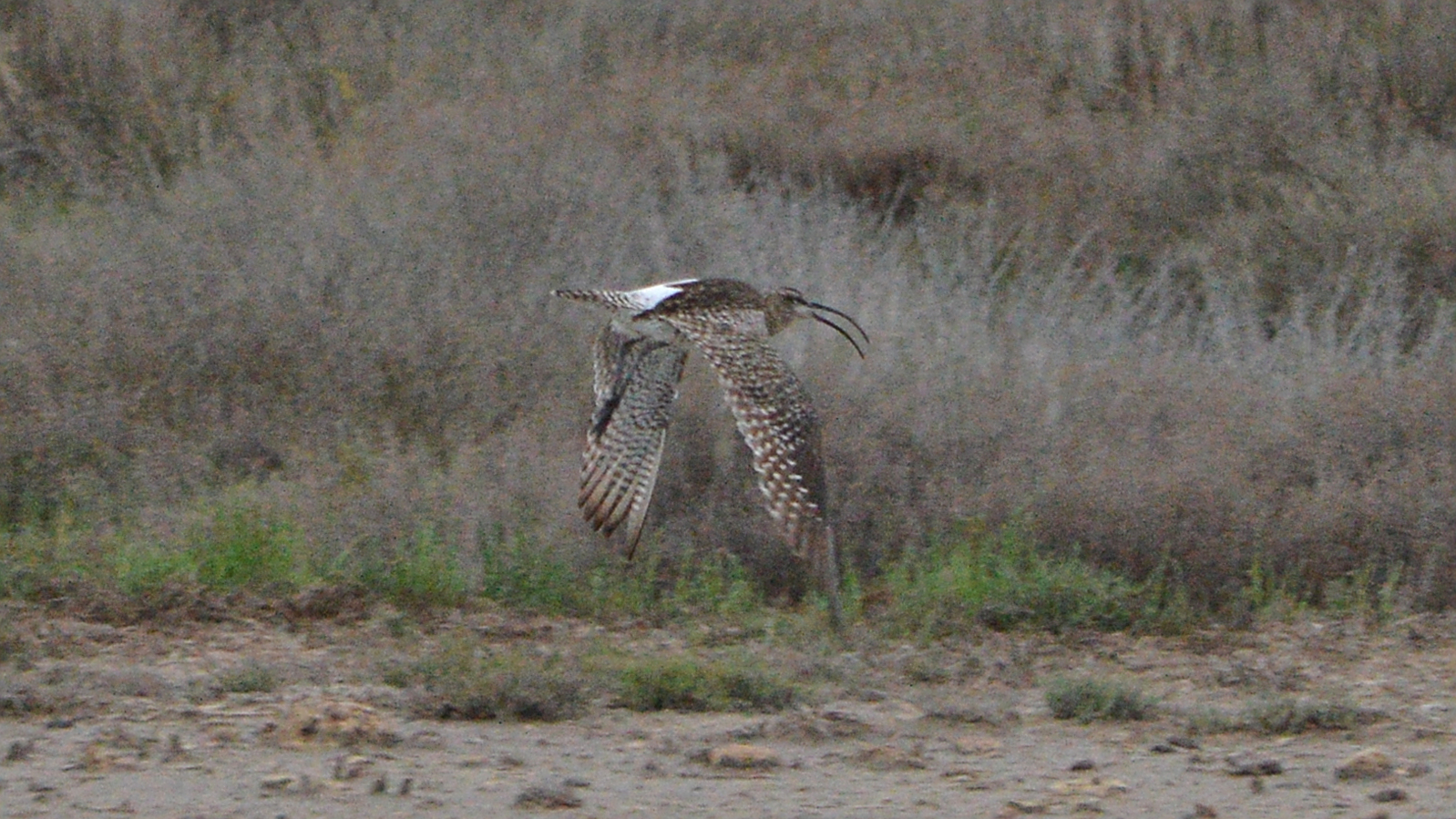
Eurasian curlew, Albufera Natural Park

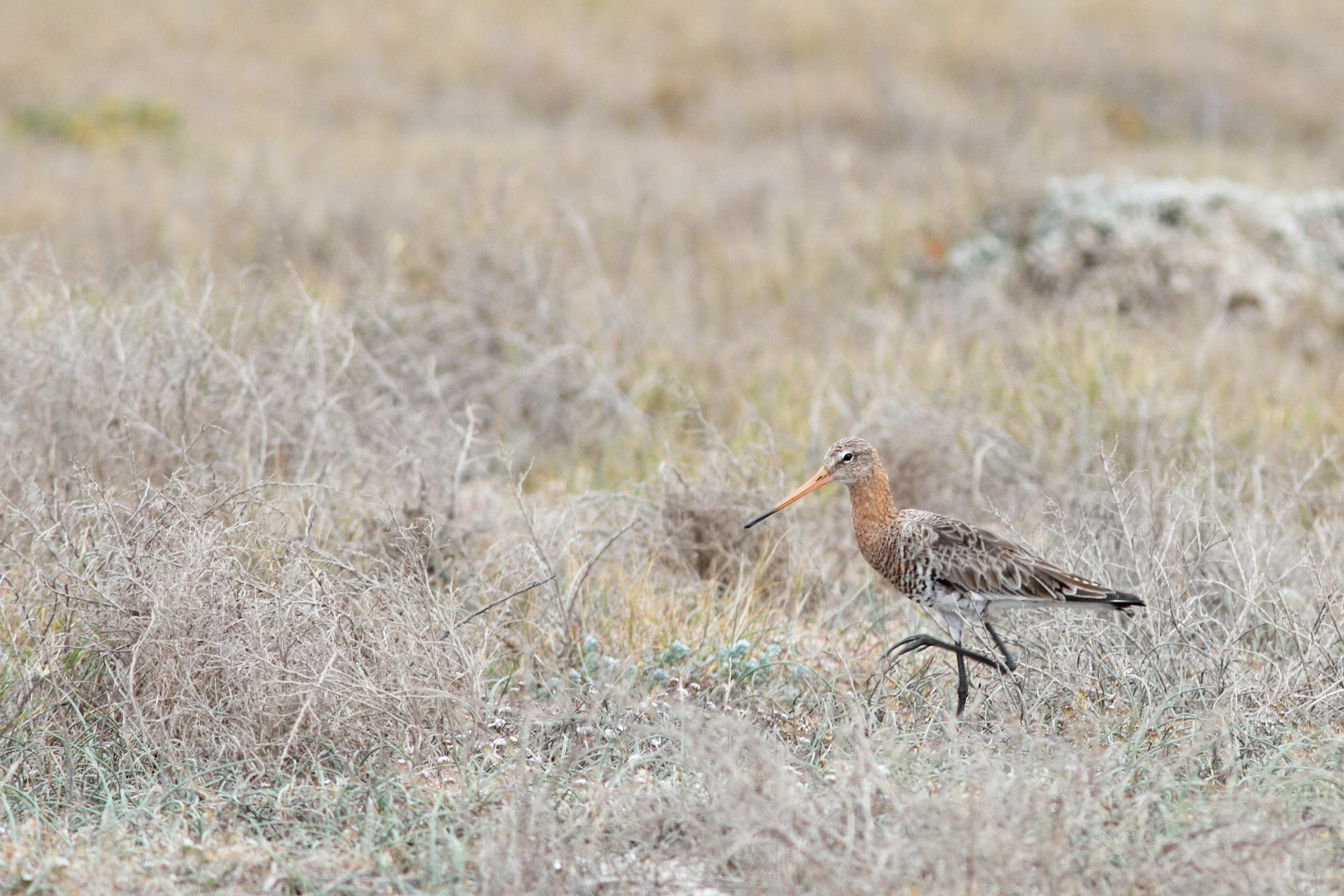
Black-tailed godwit, Cabo de gata, Almería

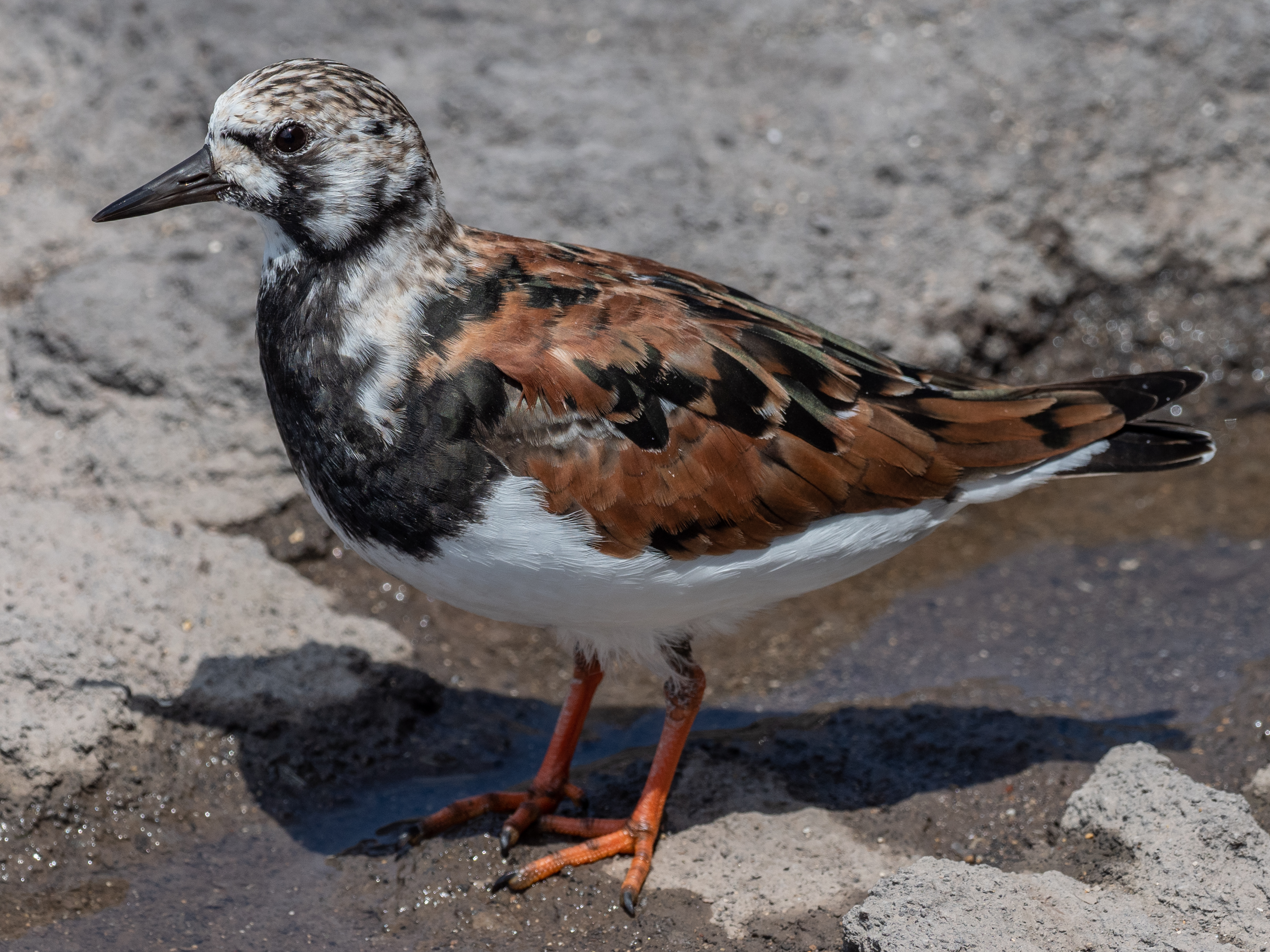
Ruddy turnstone, Las Palmas, Gran Canaria

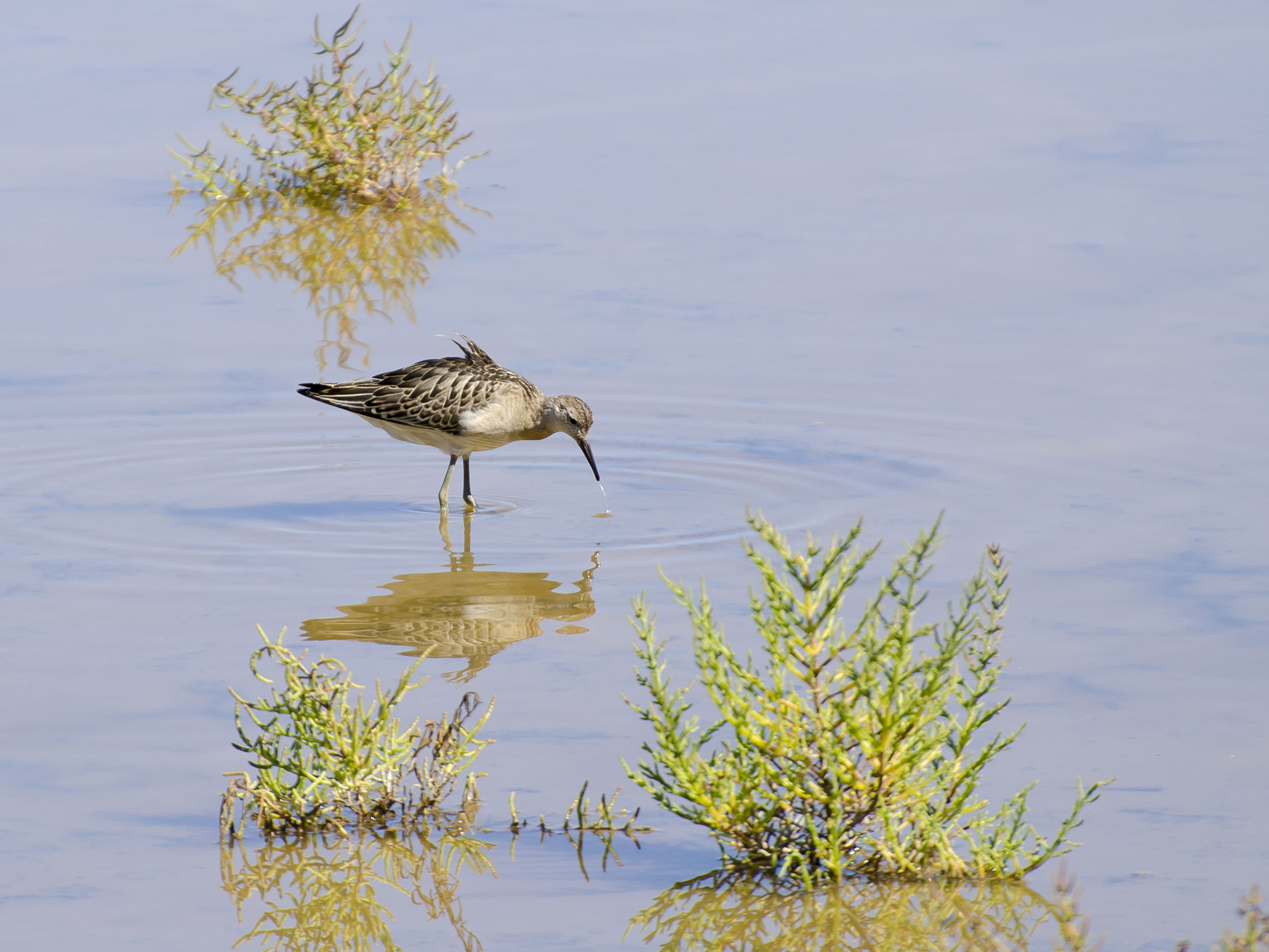
Ruff, Parc natural de s’Albufera de Mallorca, Mallorca

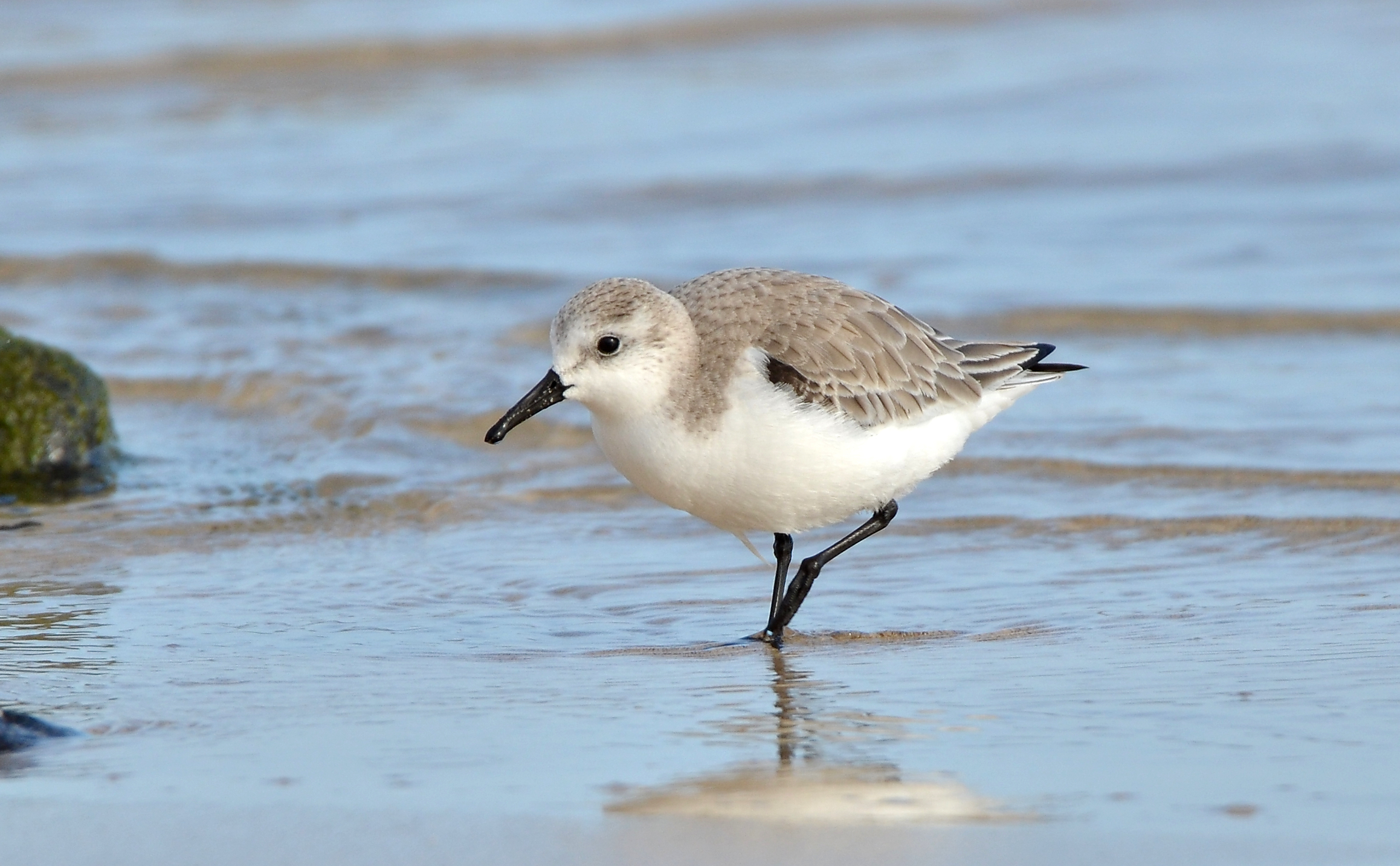
Sanderling, Fuerteventura

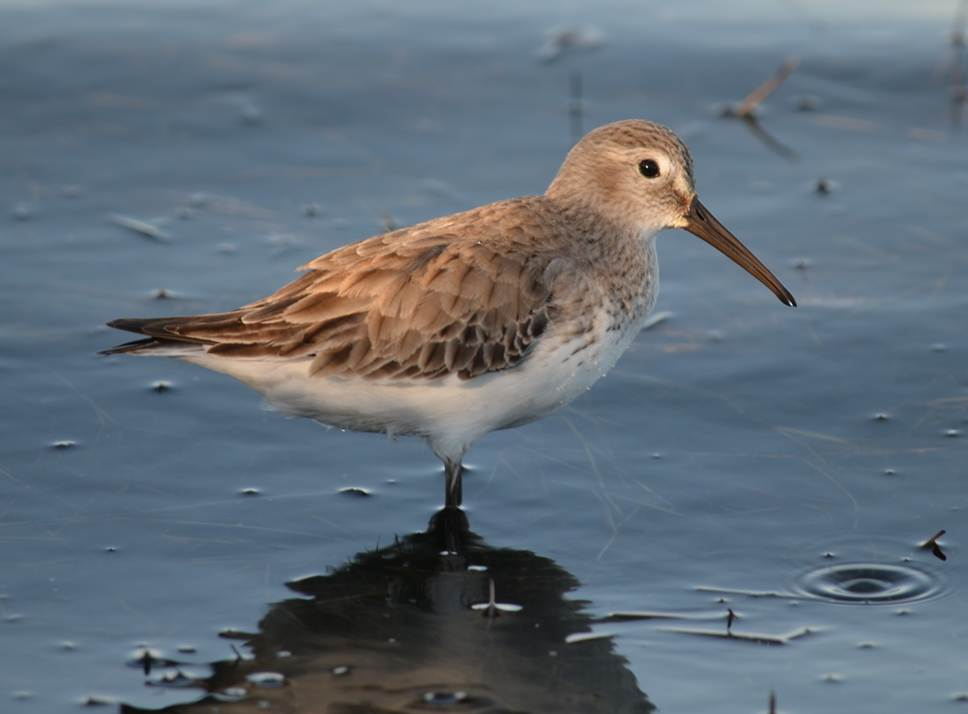
Dunlin, Santa Pola, Alicante

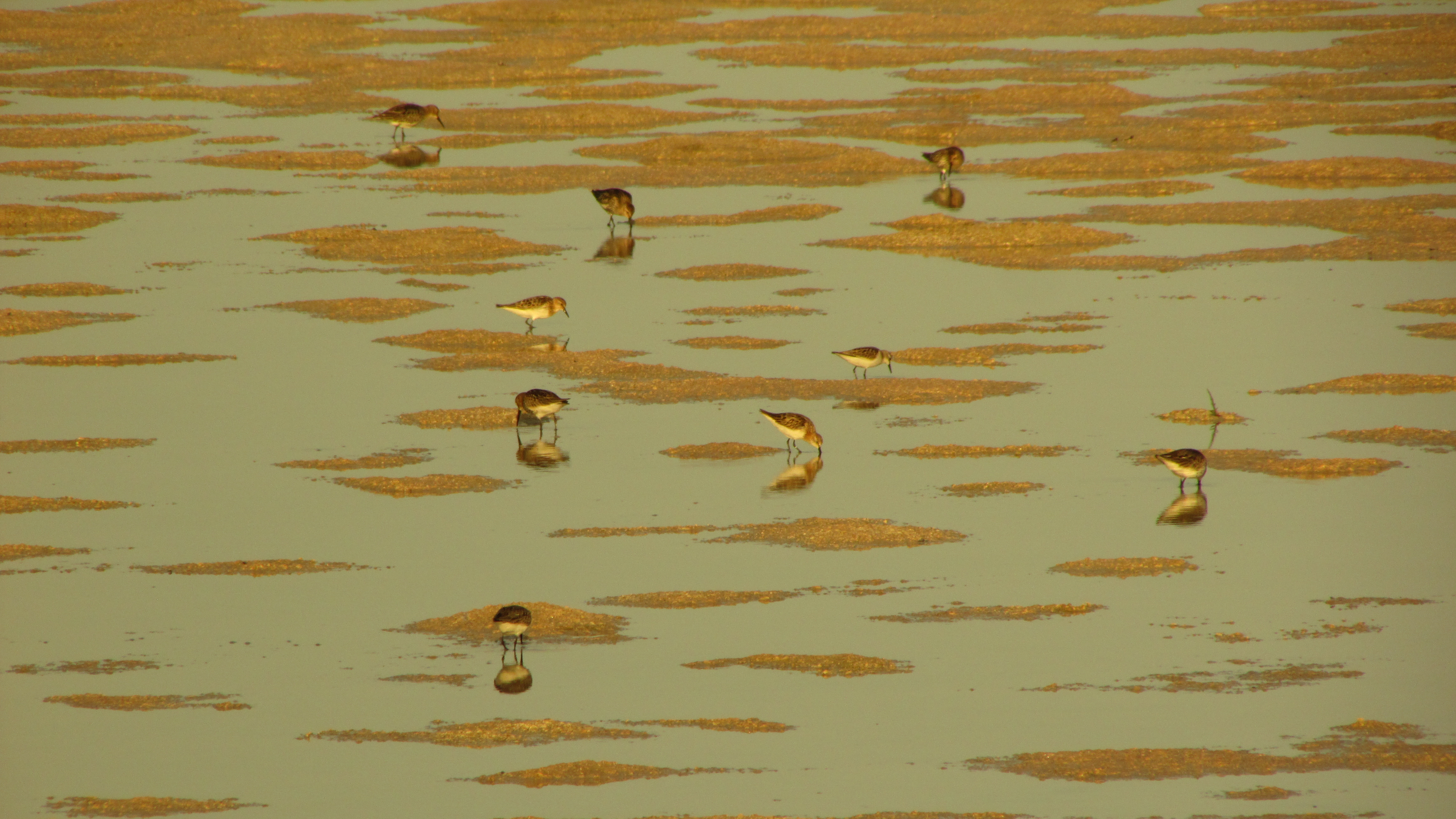
Dunlin and little stints, Paraje Natural Punta Entinas Sabinar, Andalusia

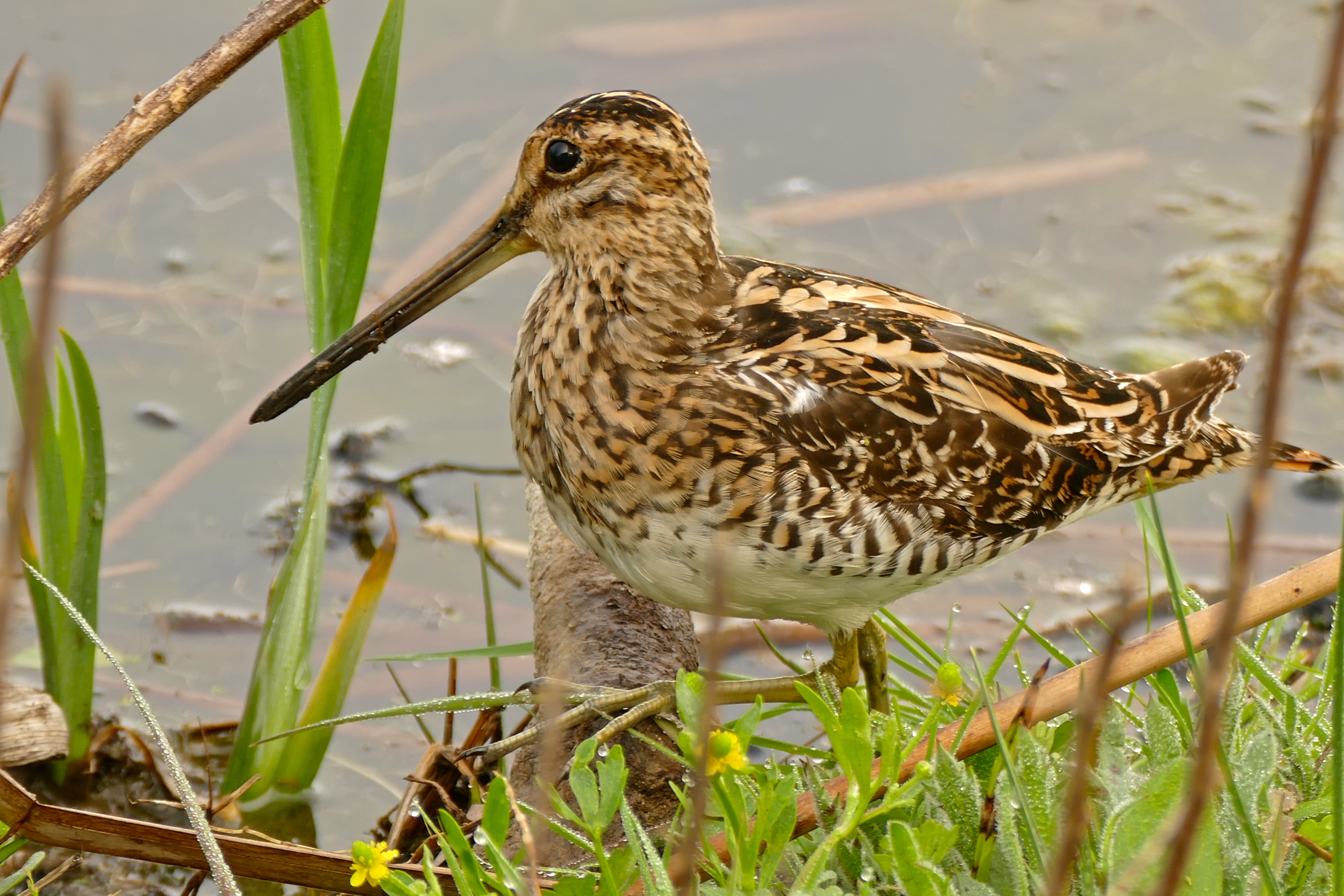
Common snipe, Empuriabrava, Catalonia

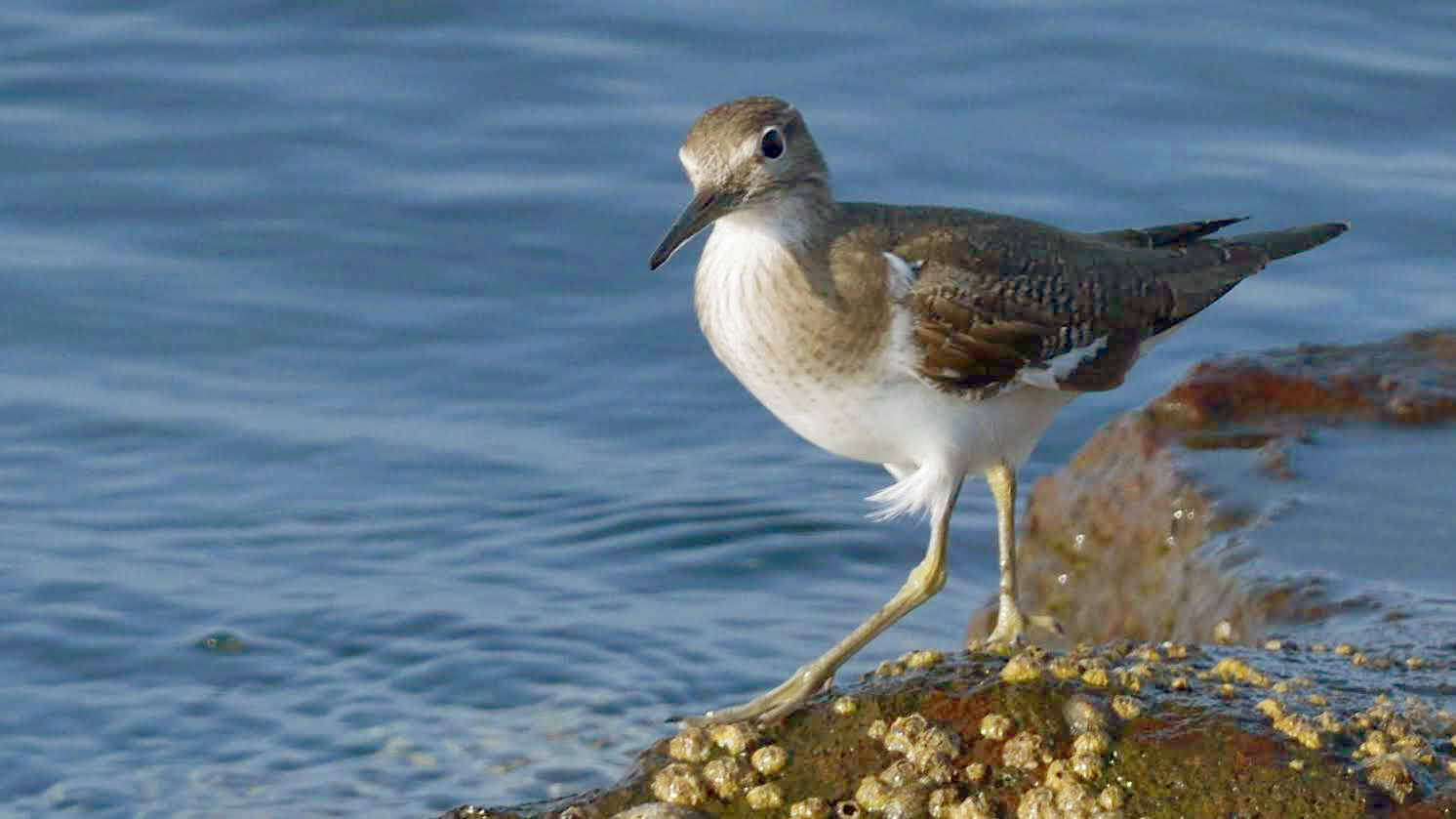
Common sandpiper, Melilla

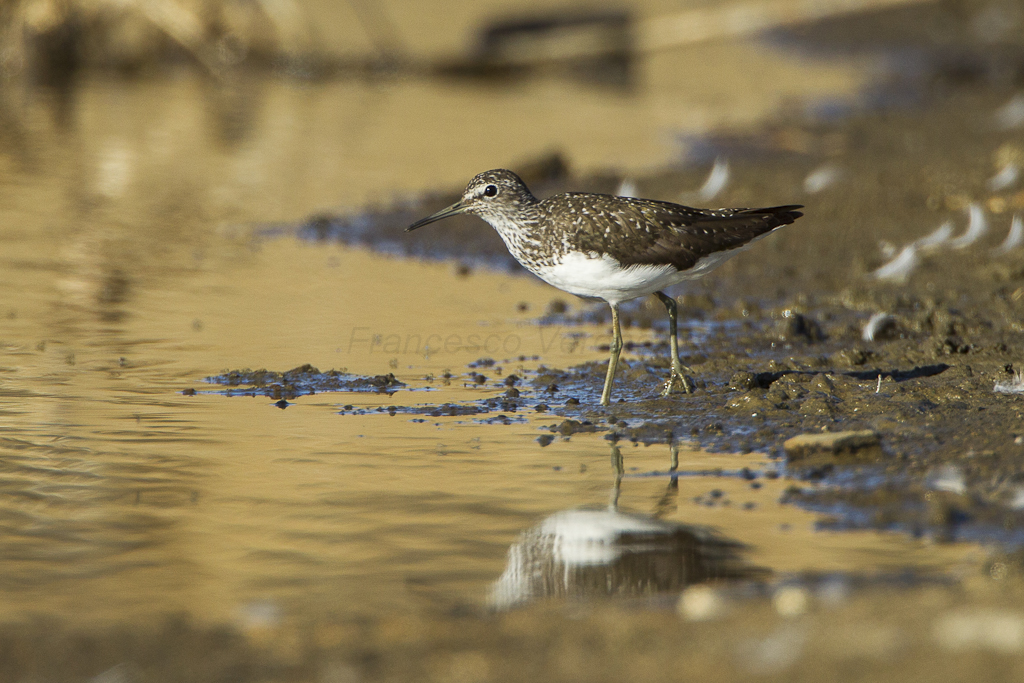
Green sandpiper, Castuera, Extremadura

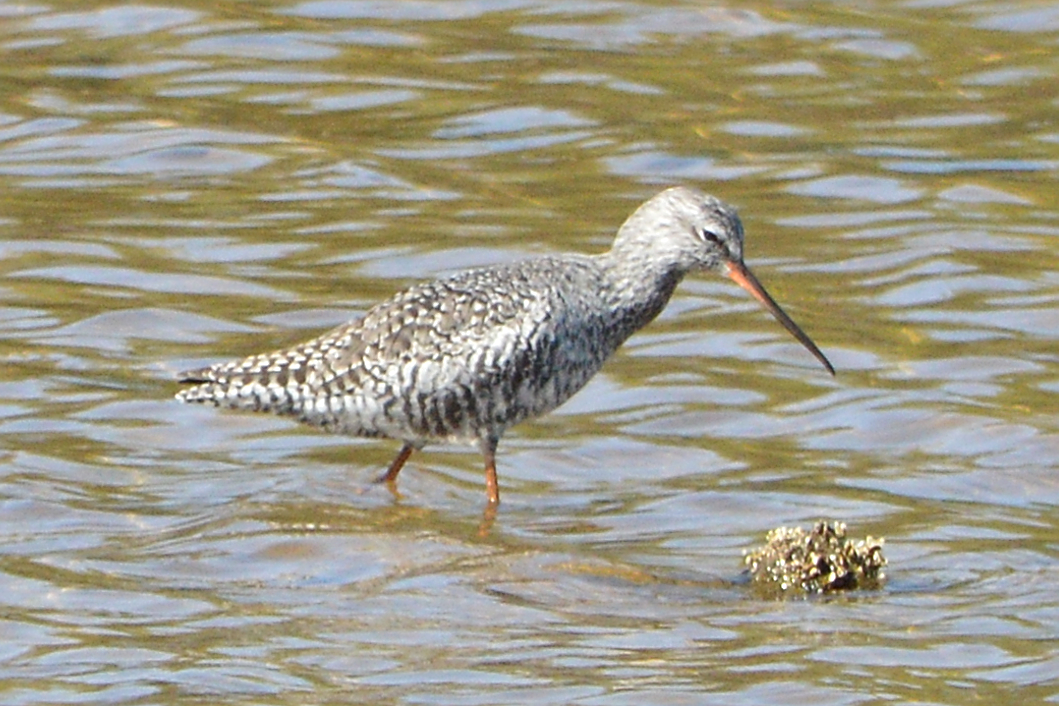
Spotted redshank, Parc natural de s’Albufera de Mallorca, Mallorca

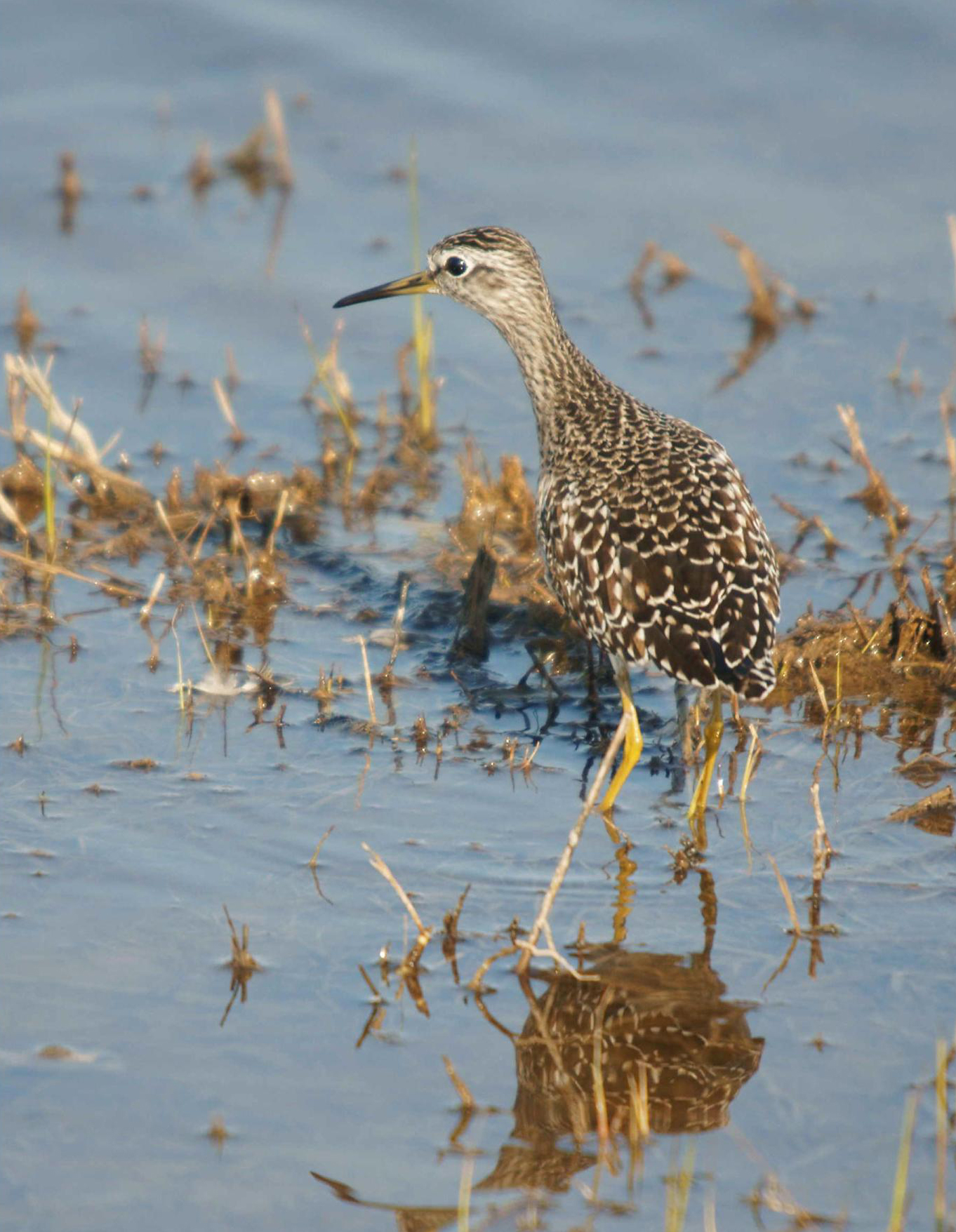
Wood sandpiper, Llobregat Delta, Barcelona

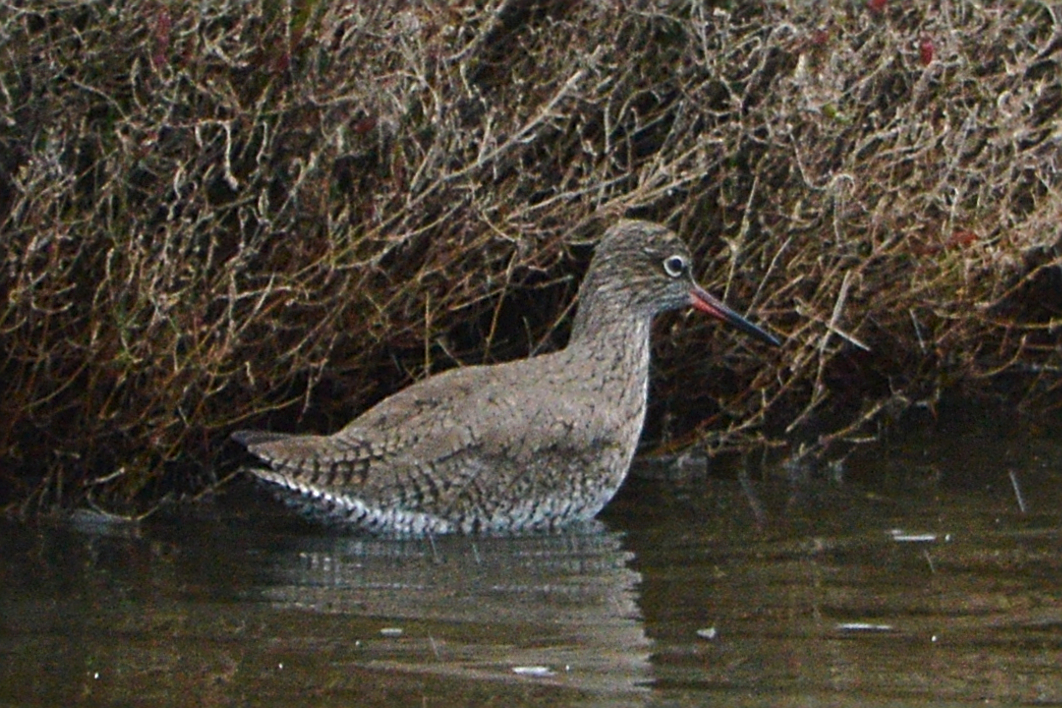
Common redshank, Parc natural de s’Albufera de Mallorca, Mallorca

== Pratincoles and coursers ==
Order: Charadriiformes Family: Glareolidae

Glareolidae is a family of wading birds comprising the pratincoles, which have short legs, long pointed wings and long forked tails, and the coursers, which have long legs, short wings and long, pointed bills which curve downwards.

- Cream-coloured courser (corredor sahariano), Cursorius cursor (R in mainland Spain only)
- Collared pratincole (canastera común), Glareola pratincola
- Black-winged pratincole (canastera alinegra), Glareola nordmanni (R)
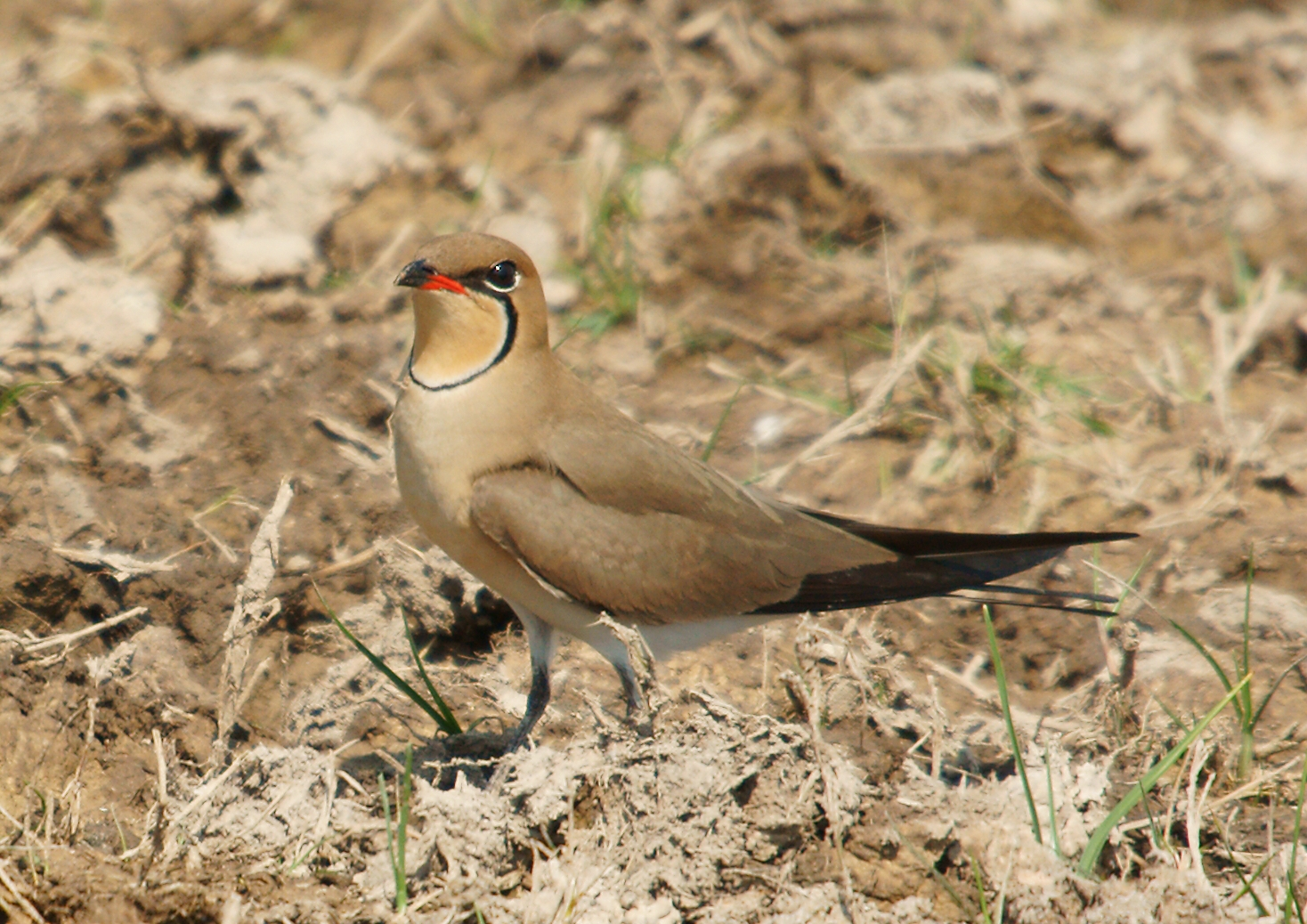
Collared pratincole, Viladecans, Catalonia

== Gulls, terns, and skimmers ==
Order: Charadriiformes Family: Laridae

Laridae is a family of medium to large seabirds, including the gulls and terns. Gulls are typically medium sized to large, grey or white, often with black markings on the head or wings; they have stout, longish bills and webbed feet. Terns are a group of smaller to medium size seabirds typically with grey or white plumage, often with black markings on the head; most hunt fish by diving but some pick insects off the surface of fresh water. Gulls and terns are generally long-lived birds, with several species known to live in excess of 30 years.

- Black-legged kittiwake (gaviota tridáctila), Rissa tridactyla
- Sabine's gull (gaviota de Sabine), Xema sabini
- Slender-billed gull (gaviota picofina), Chroicocephalus genei
- Bonaparte's gull (gaviota de Bonaparte), Chroicocephalus philadelphia (R)
- Black-headed gull (gaviota reidora), Chroicocephalus ridibundus
- Grey-headed gull (gaviota cabecigrís), Chroicocephalus cirrocephalus (R)
- Little gull (gaviota enana), Hydrocoloeus minutus
- Ross's gull (gaviota rosada), Rhodostethia rosea (R)
- Laughing gull (gaviota guanaguanare), Leucophaeus atricilla (R)
- Franklin's gull (gaviota pipizcán), Leucophaeus pipixcan (R)
- Audouin's gull (gaviota de Audouin), Ichthyaetus audouinii
- Mediterranean gull (gaviota cabecinegra), Ichthyaetus melanocephalus
- Pallas's gull (gavión cabecinegro), Ichthyaetus ichthyaetus (R)
- Common gull (gaviota cana), Larus canus
- Ring-billed gull (gaviota de Delaware), Larus delawarensis
- Great black-backed gull (gavión atlántico), Larus marinus
- Kelp gull (gaviota cocinera), Larus dominicanus (R)
- Glaucous-winged gull (gaviota de Bering), Larus glaucescens (R)
- Glaucous gull (gavión hiperbóreo), Larus hyperboreus
- Iceland gull (gaviota groenlandesa), Larus glaucoides
- European herring gull (gaviota argéntea europea), Larus argentatus
- American herring gull (gaviota argéntea americana), Larus smithsonianus (R)
- Caspian gull (gaviota del Caspio), Larus cachinnans
- Yellow-legged gull (gaviota patiamarilla), Larus michahellis
- Lesser black-backed gull (gaviota sombría), Larus fuscus
- Gull-billed tern (pagaza piconegra), Gelochelidon nilotica
- Caspian tern (pagaza piquirroja), Hydroprogne caspia
- Royal tern (charrán real), Thalasseus maximus (R)
- West African crested tern (charrán real africano), Thalasseus albididorsalis (R)
- Lesser crested tern (charrán bengalí), Thalasseus bengalensis
- Sandwich tern (charrán patinegro), Thalasseus sandvicensis
- Elegant tern (charrán elegante), Thalasseus elegans (R)
- Little tern (charrancito común), Sternula albifrons
- Least tern (charrancito americano), Sternula antillarum (R)
- Bridled tern (charrán embridado), Onychoprion anaethetus (R)
- Sooty tern (charrán sombrío), Onychoprion fuscatus (R)
- Roseate tern (charrán rosado), Sterna dougallii
- Common tern (charrán común), Sterna hirundo
- Arctic tern (charrán ártico), Sterna paradisaea
- Forster's tern (charrán de Forster), Sterna forsteri (R)
- Whiskered tern (fumarel cariblanco), Chlidonias hybrida
- White-winged tern (fumarel aliblanco), Chlidonias leucopterus
- Black tern (fumarel común), Chlidonias niger
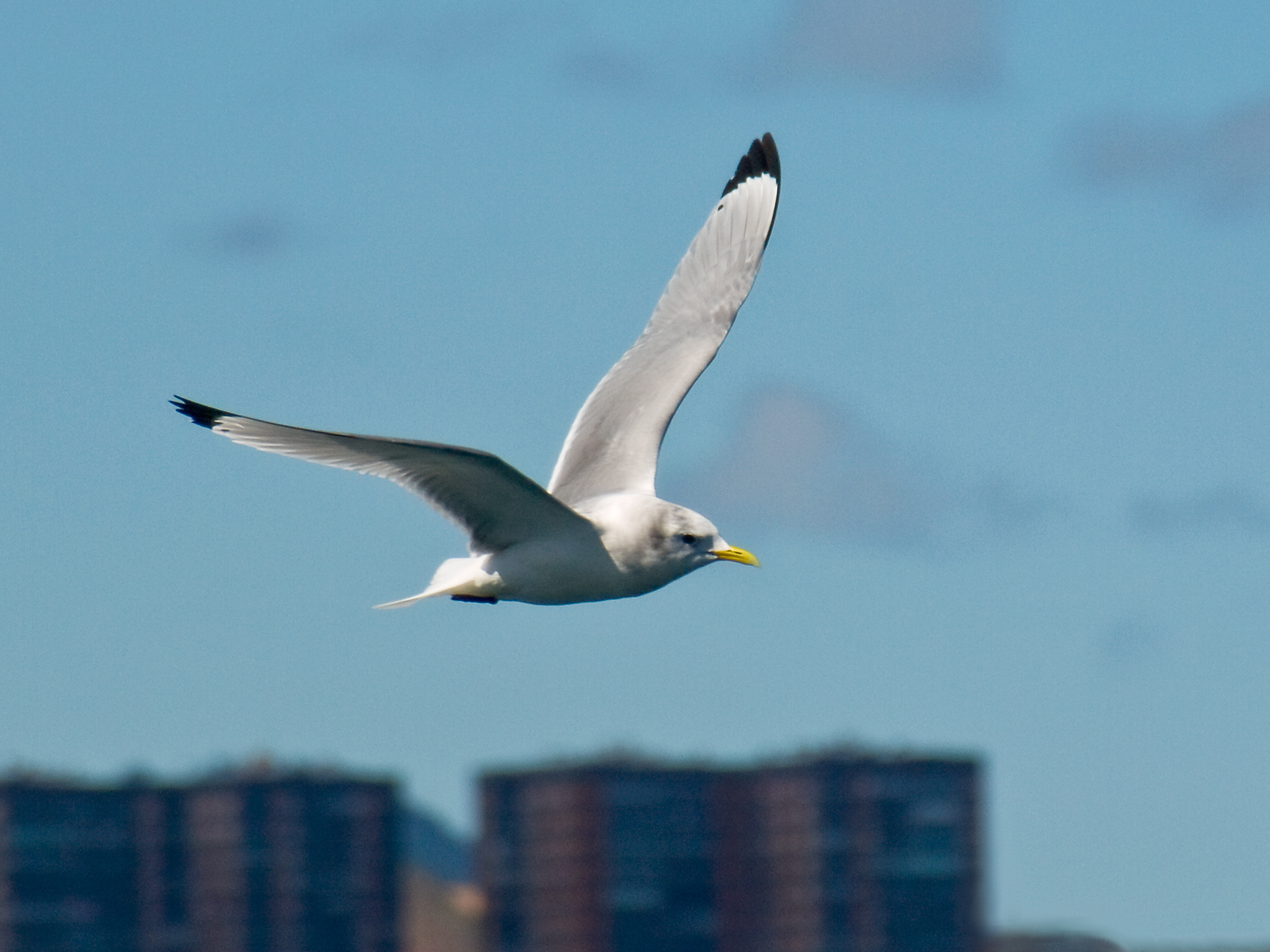
Black-legged kittiwake, Port of Las Palmas, Las Palmas, Canary Islands

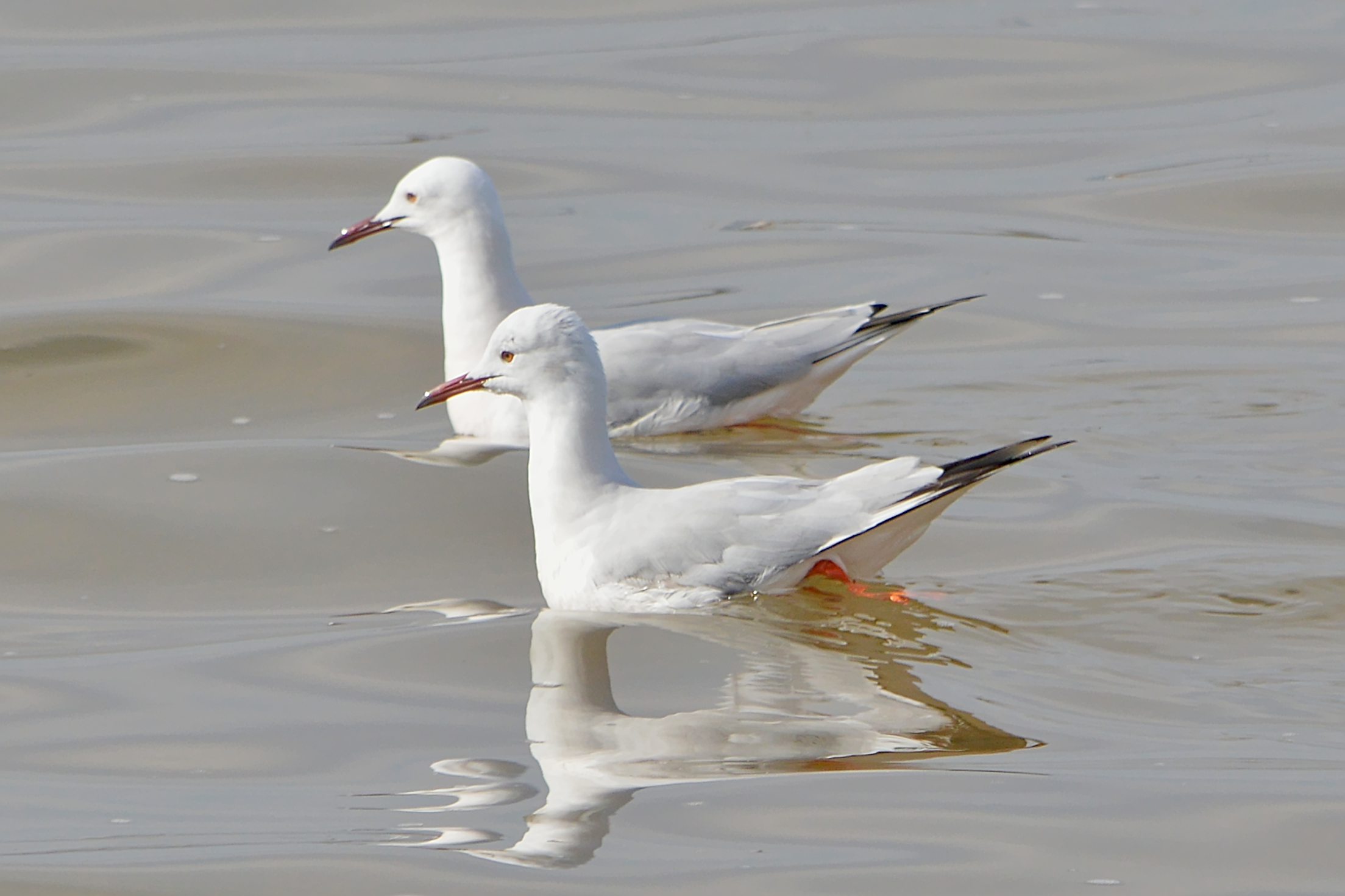
Slender-billed gulls, Salinas y Arenales de San Pedro del Pinatar, Murcia

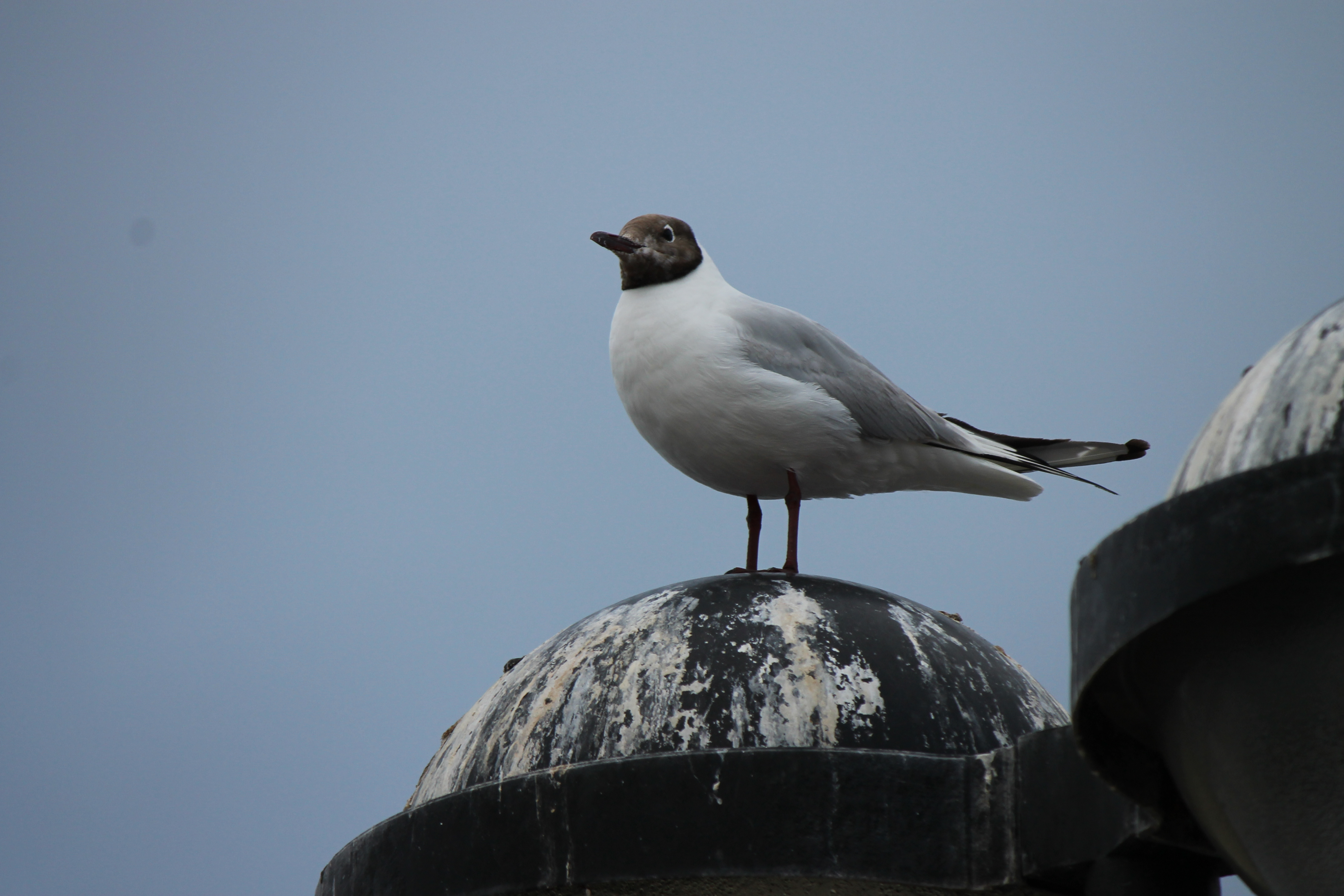
Black-headed gull, Ferrol

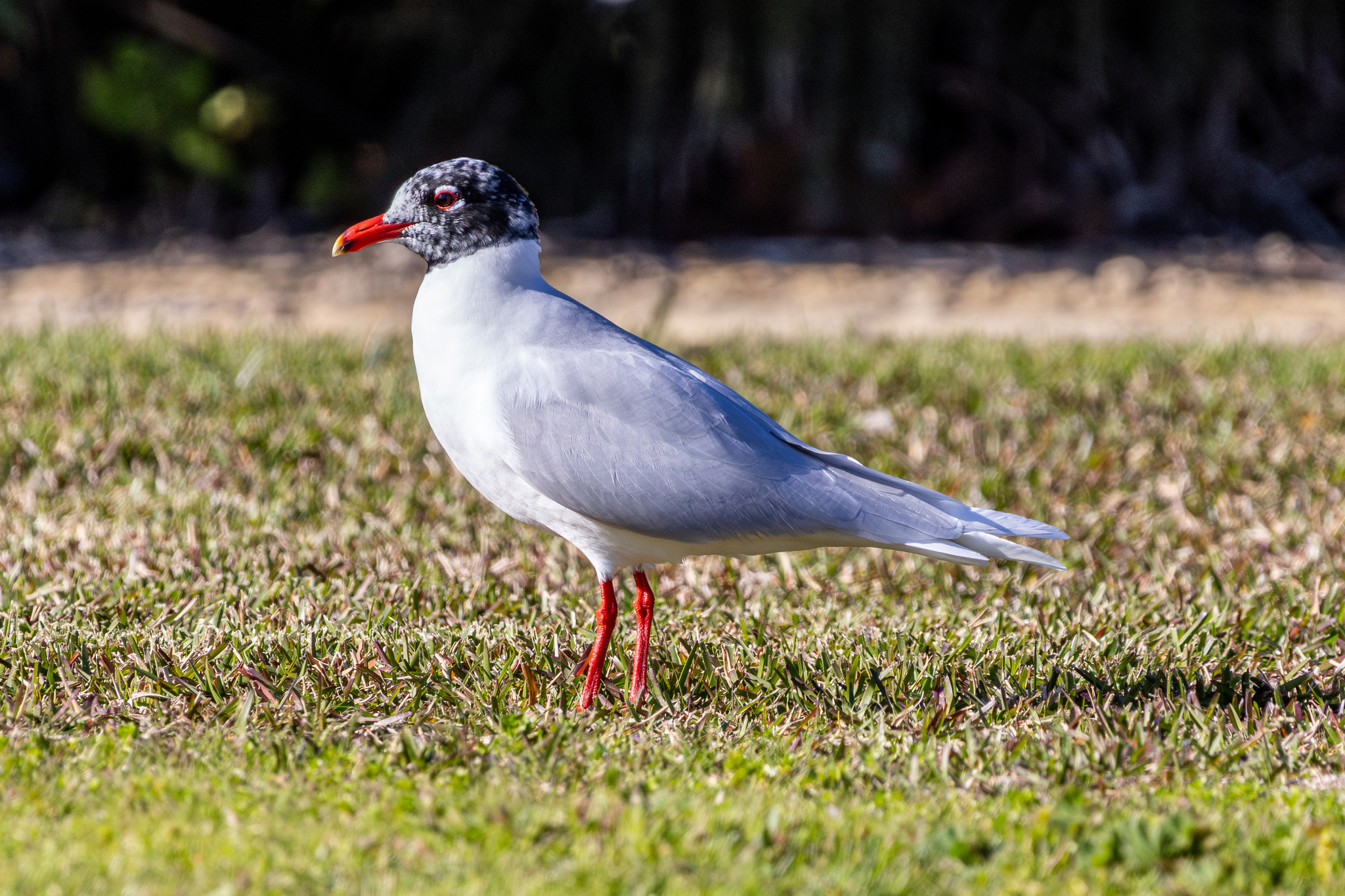
Mediterranean gull, Costa Ballena, Chipiona, Cádiz

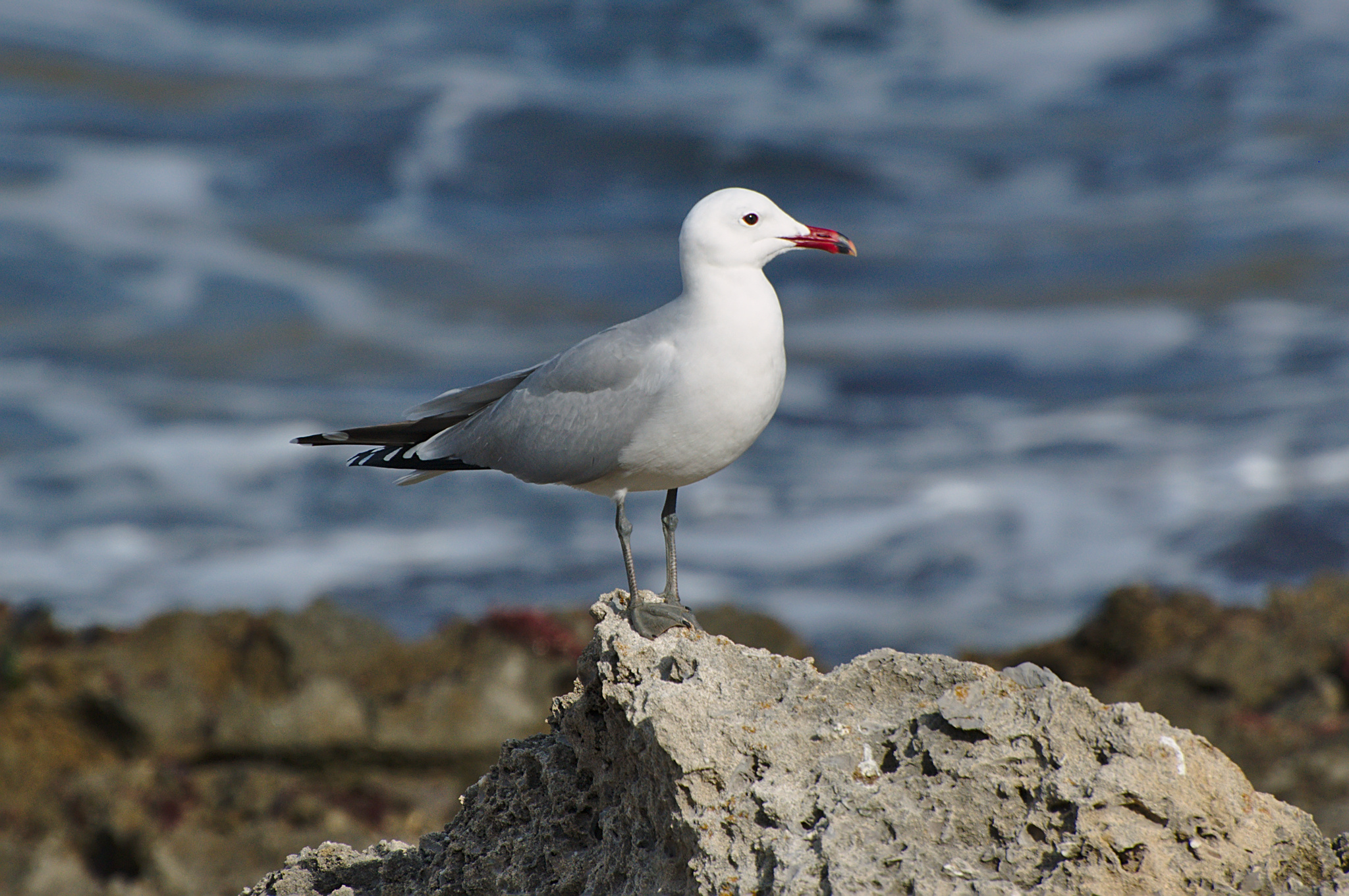
Audouin's gull, Palma de Mallorca

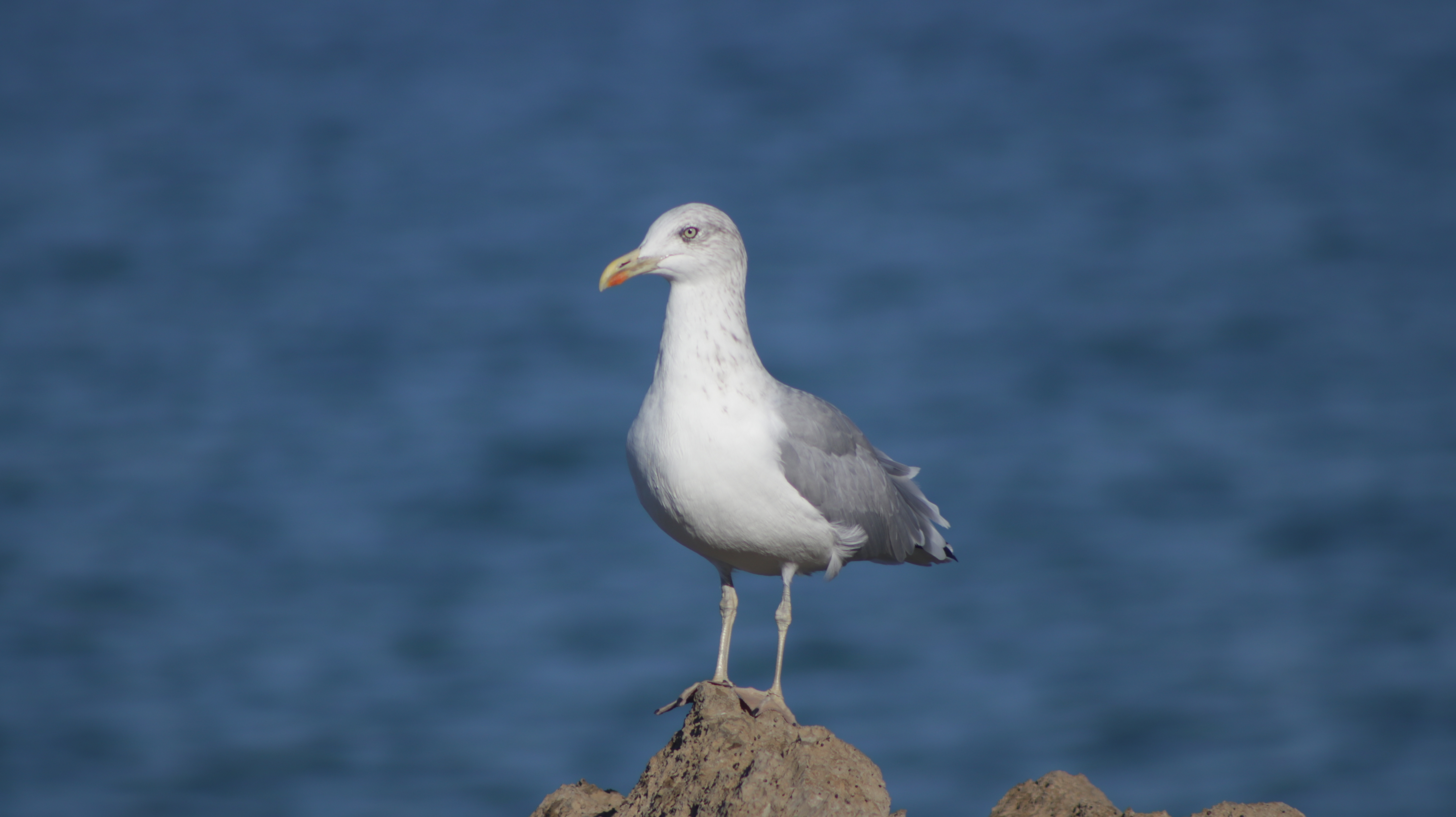
European herring gull, San Sebastián

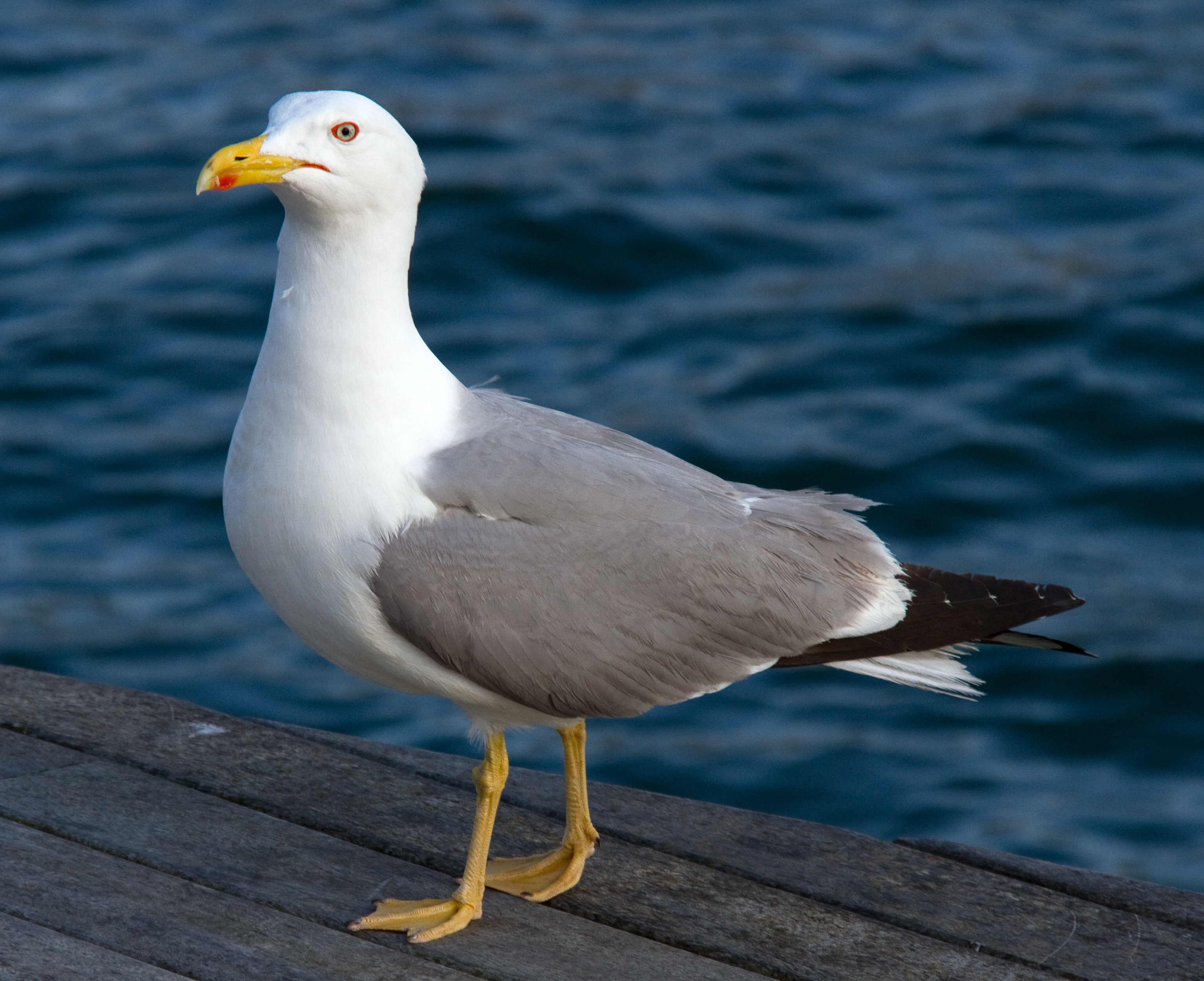
Yellow-legged gull, Barcelona

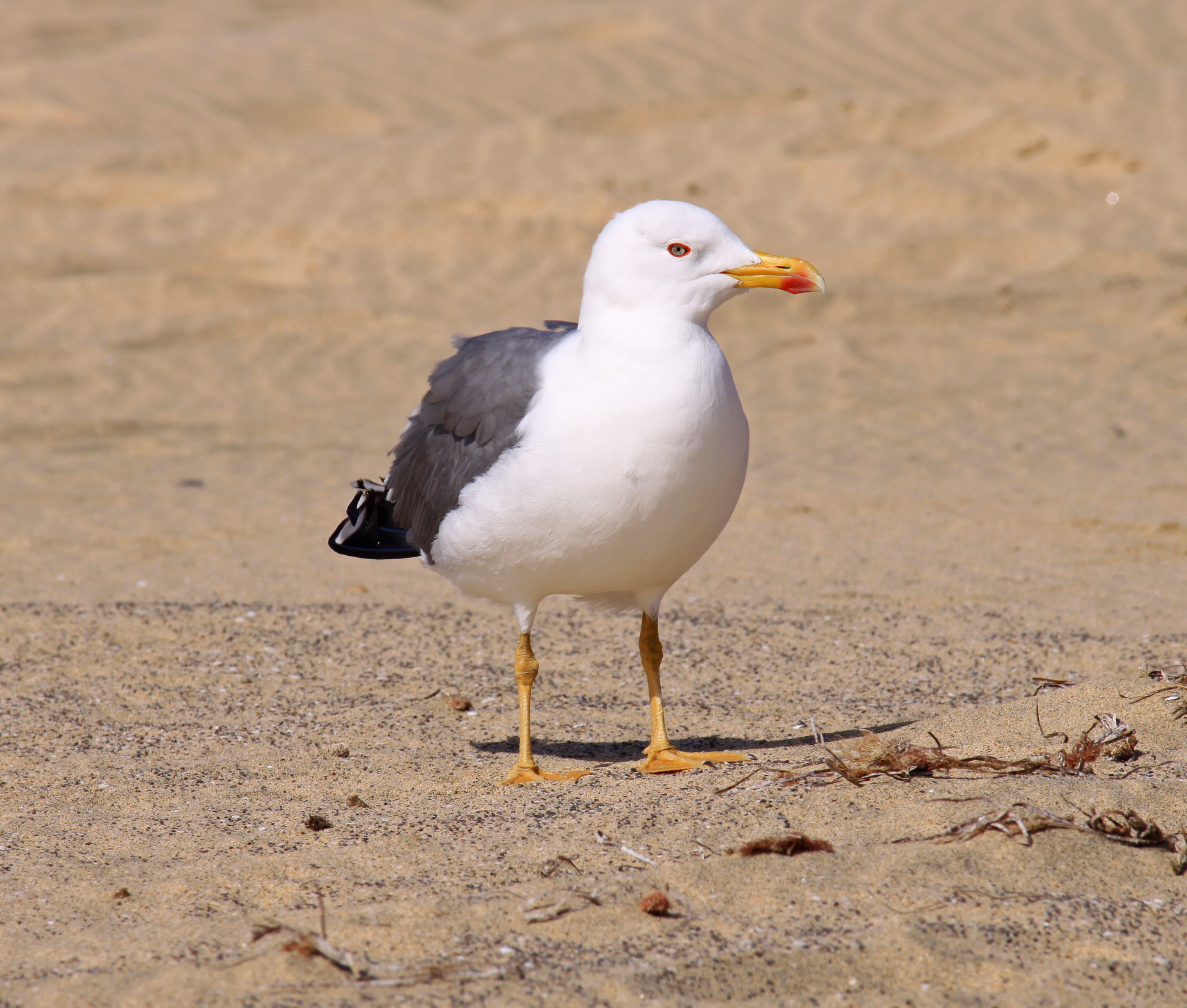
Lesser black-backed gull, Fuerteventura

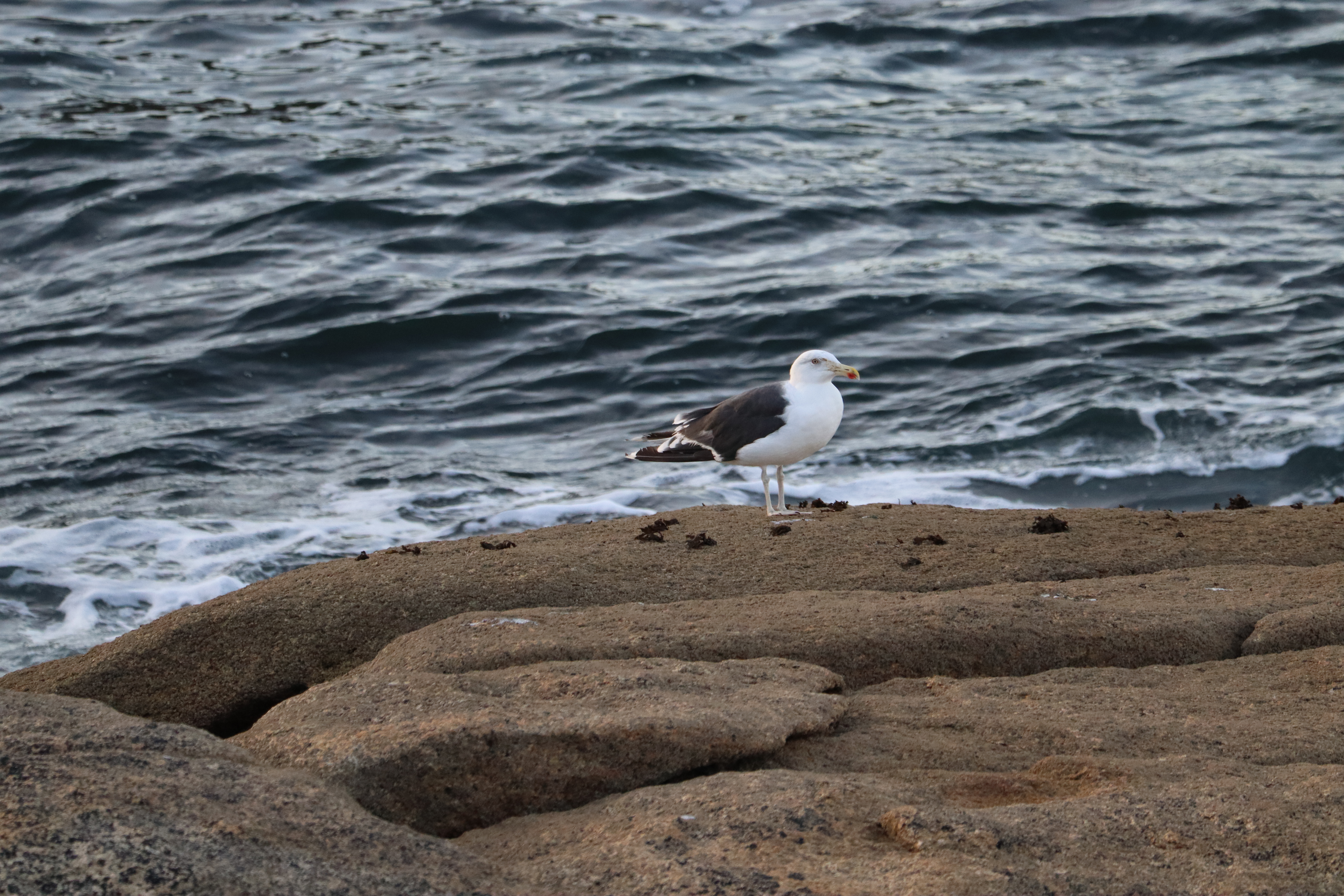
Great black-backed gull, Burela, Lugo, Galicia

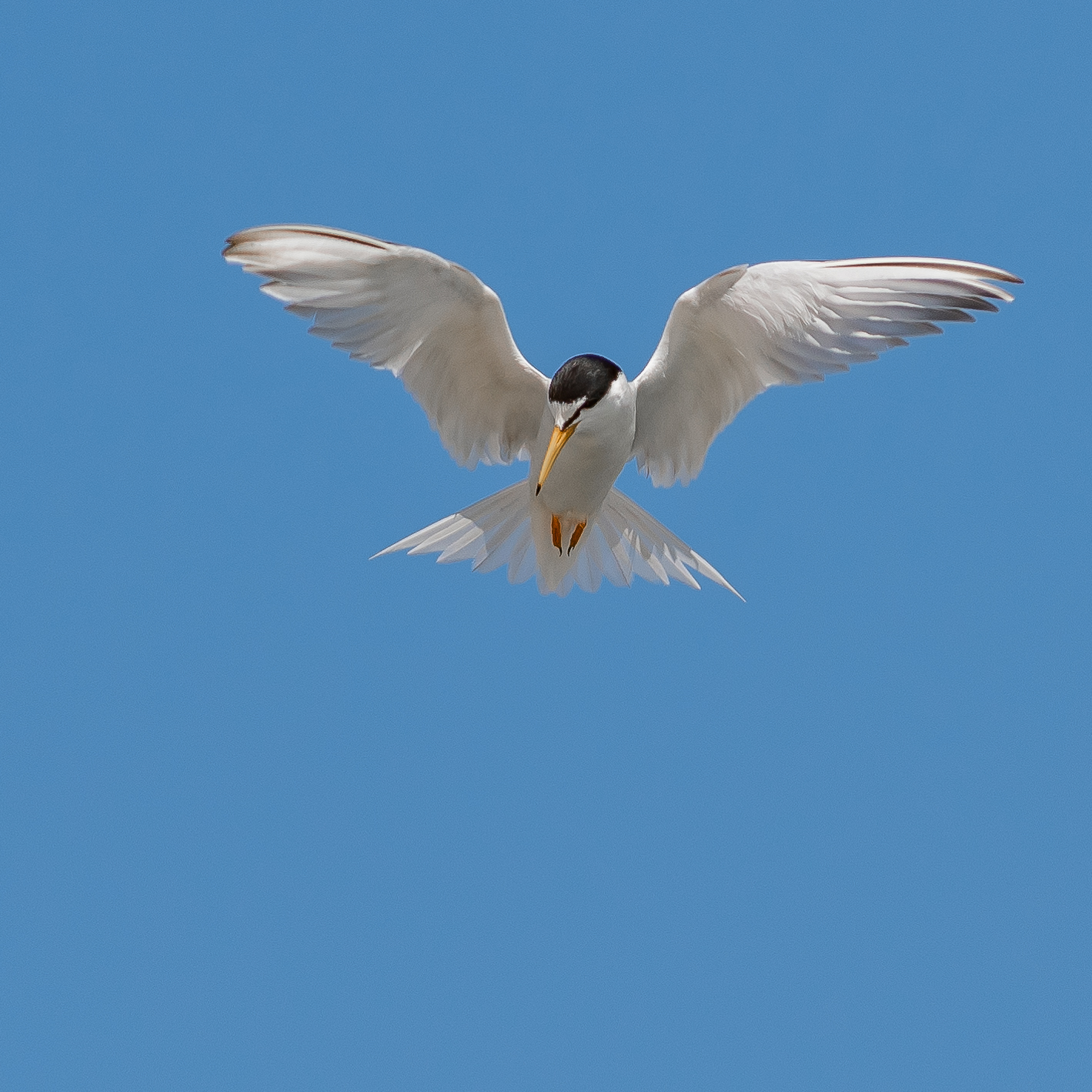
Little tern, Spain

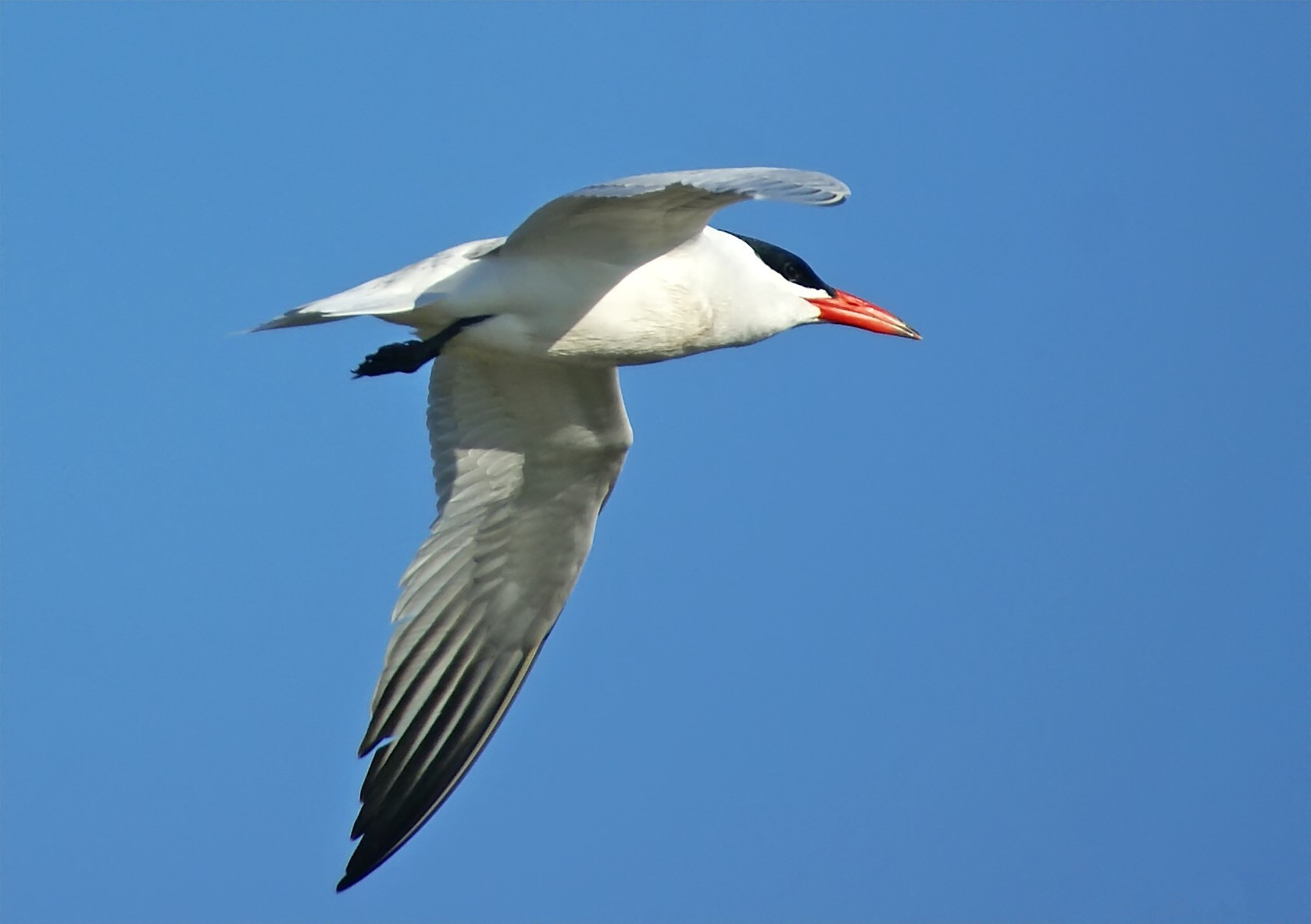
Caspian tern, Llobregat Delta, Barcelona

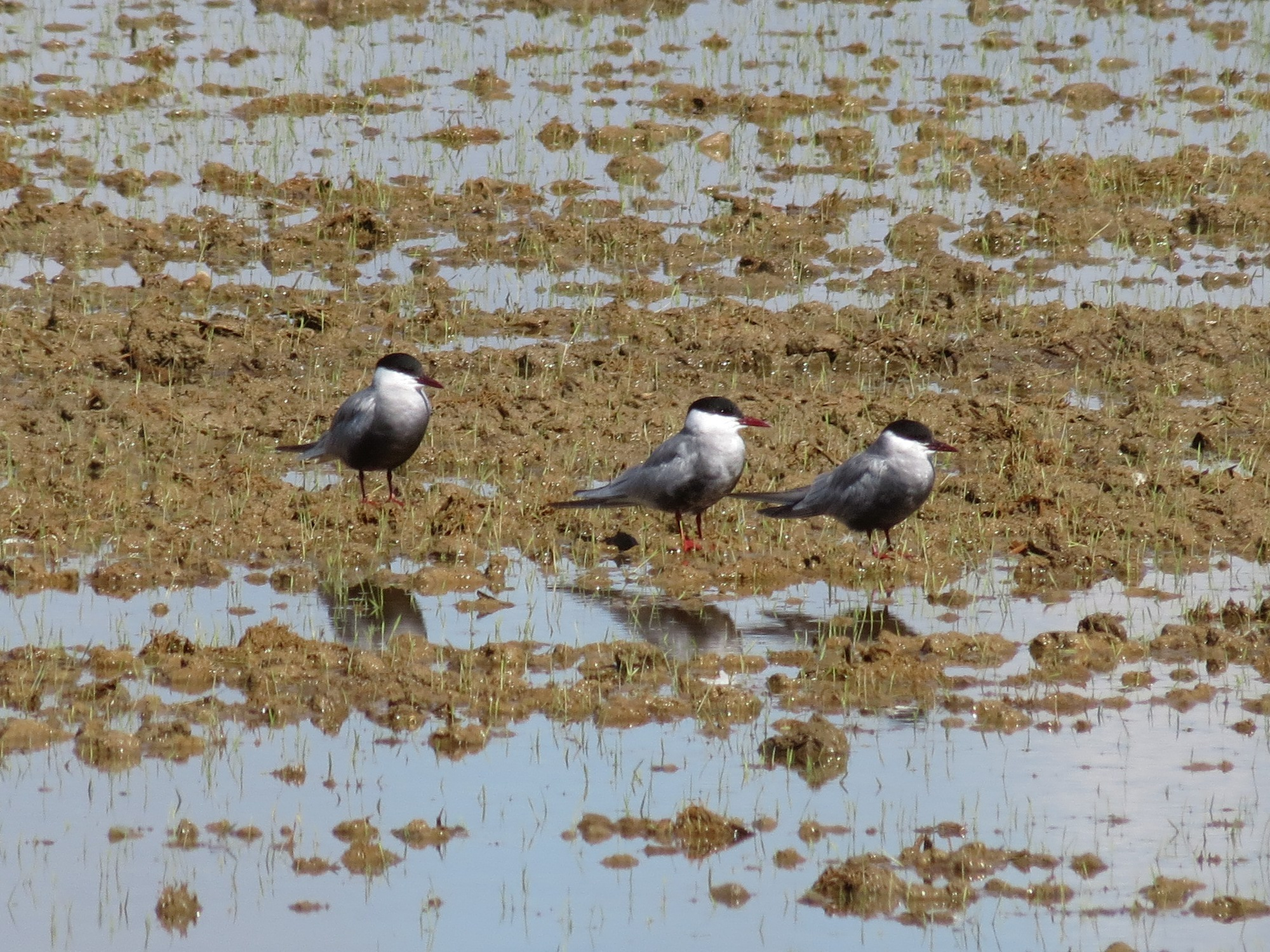
Whiskered terns, Ebro Delta, Catalonia

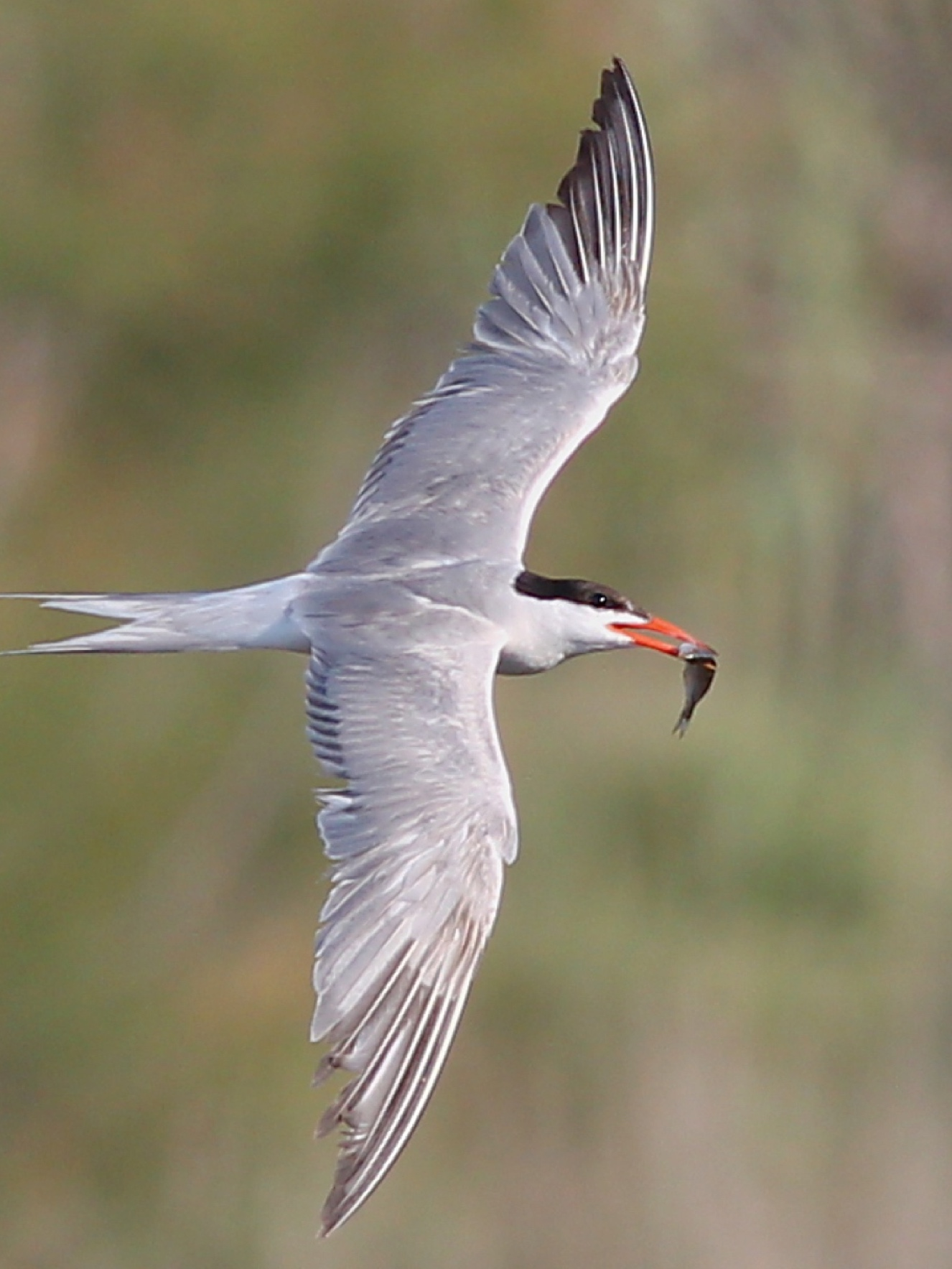
Common tern, Valencia

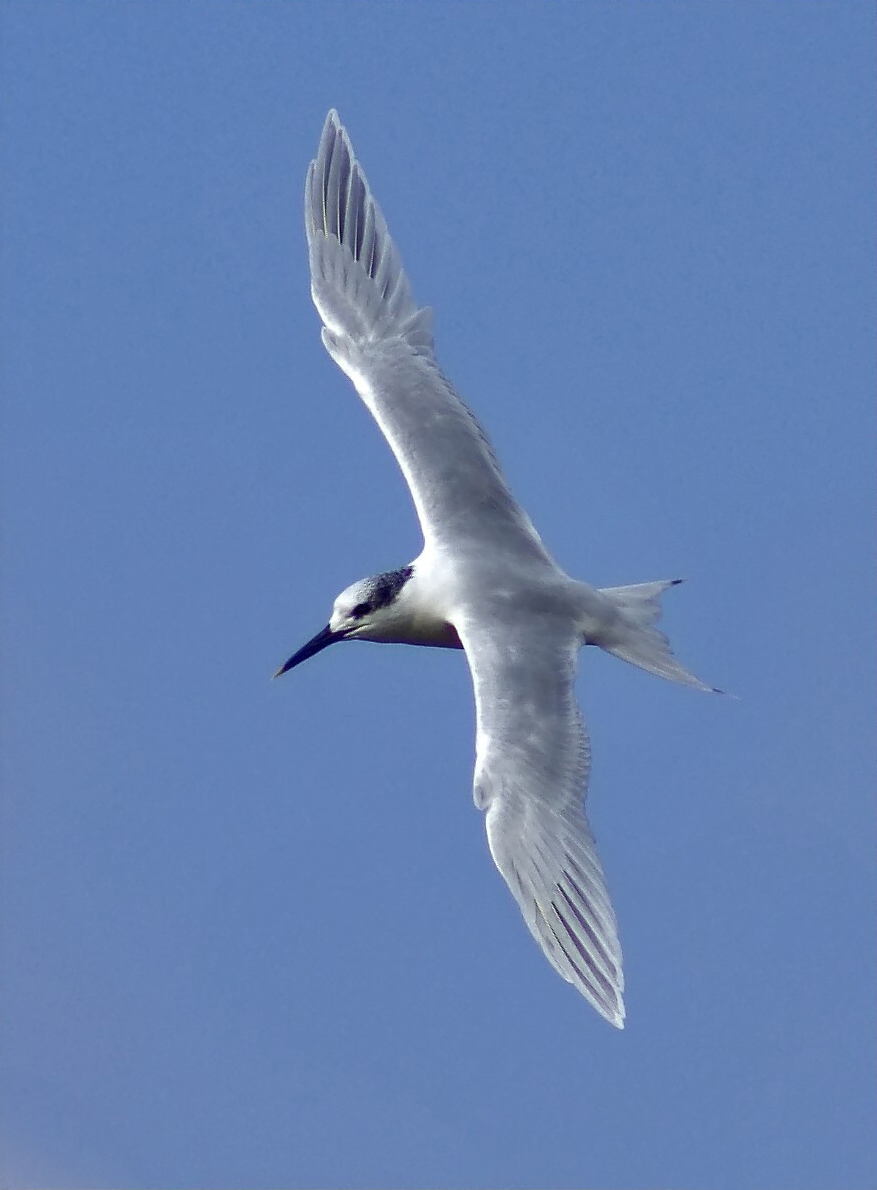
Sandwich tern, Llobregat Delta, Barcelona

== Skuas and jaegers ==
Order: Charadriiformes Family: Stercorariidae

The family Stercorariidae are, in general, medium to large birds, typically with grey or brown plumage, often with white markings on the wings. They nest on the ground in temperate and arctic regions and are long-distance migrants.

- South polar skua (págalo polar), Stercorarius maccormicki (R)
- Great skua (págalo grande), Stercorarius skua
- Pomarine skua (págalo pomarino), Stercorarius pomarinus
- Arctic skua (págalo parásito), Stercorarius parasiticus
- Long-tailed skua (págalo rabero), Stercorarius longicaudus

== Auks, guillemots, and puffins ==
Order: Charadriiformes Family: Alcidae

Auks are superficially similar to penguins due to their black-and-white plumage, their upright posture and some of their habits; however, they are not related to the penguins and differ in being able to fly. Auks live on the open sea, only deliberately coming ashore to nest.

- Little auk (mérgulo atlántico), Alle alle (R)
- Common guillemot (arao común), Uria aalge
- Razorbill (alca común), Alca torda near-threatened
- Black guillemot (arao aliblanco), Cepphus grylle (R)
- Atlantic puffin (frailecillo atlántico), Fratercula arctica

== Tropicbirds ==
Order: Phaethontiformes Family: Phaethontidae

Tropicbirds are slender white birds of tropical oceans with exceptionally long central tail feathers. Their long wings have black markings, as does the head.

- Red-billed tropicbird (rabijunco etéreo), Phaeton aetherius (R except on Canary Islands)

== Divers ==
Order: Gaviiformes Family: Gaviidae

Divers, known as loons in North America, are a group of aquatic birds found widely in northern Eurasia and North America. They are roughly the size of cormorants, which they somewhat resemble when swimming, but to which they are completely unrelated.

- Red-throated diver (colimbo chico), Gavia stellata
- Black-throated diver (colimbo ártico), Gavia arctica
- Pacific diver (colimbo del Pacífico), Gavia pacifica (R)
- Great northern diver (colimbo grande), Gavia immer

== Southern storm petrels ==
Order: Procellariiformes Family: Oceanitidae

Southern storm petrels, are seabirds in the family Oceanitidae, part of the order Procellariiformes. These smallest of seabirds feed on planktonic crustaceans and small fish picked from the surface, typically while hovering. Their flight is fluttering and sometimes bat-like.

- Wilson's storm petrel (paíño de Wilson), Oceanites oceanicus
- White-faced storm petrel (paíño pechialbo), Pelagodroma marina (R, except for Canary Islands)
- Black-bellied storm petrel (paíño ventrinegro), Fregetta tropica (R)

== Albatrosses ==
Order: Procellariiformes Family: Diomedeidae

The albatrosses are among the largest flying birds, with long, narrow wings for gliding. The majority are found in the Southern Hemisphere with only vagrants occurring in the North Atlantic.

- Black-browed albatross (albatros ojeroso), Thalassarche melanophris (R)
- Yellow-nosed albatross (albatros picofino), Thalassarche chlororhynchos (R)

== Northern storm petrels ==
Order: Procellariiformes Family: Hydrobatidae

Though the members of this family are similar in many respects to the southern storm petrels, including their general appearance and habits, there are enough genetic differences to warrant their placement in a separate family.

- European storm petrel (paíño europeo), Hydrobates pelagicus
- Swinhoe's storm petrel (paíño de Swinhoe), Hydrobates monorhis (R)
- Leach's storm petrel (paíño boreal), Hydrobates leucorheus
- Band-rumped storm petrel (paíño de Madeira), Hydrobates castro (R)
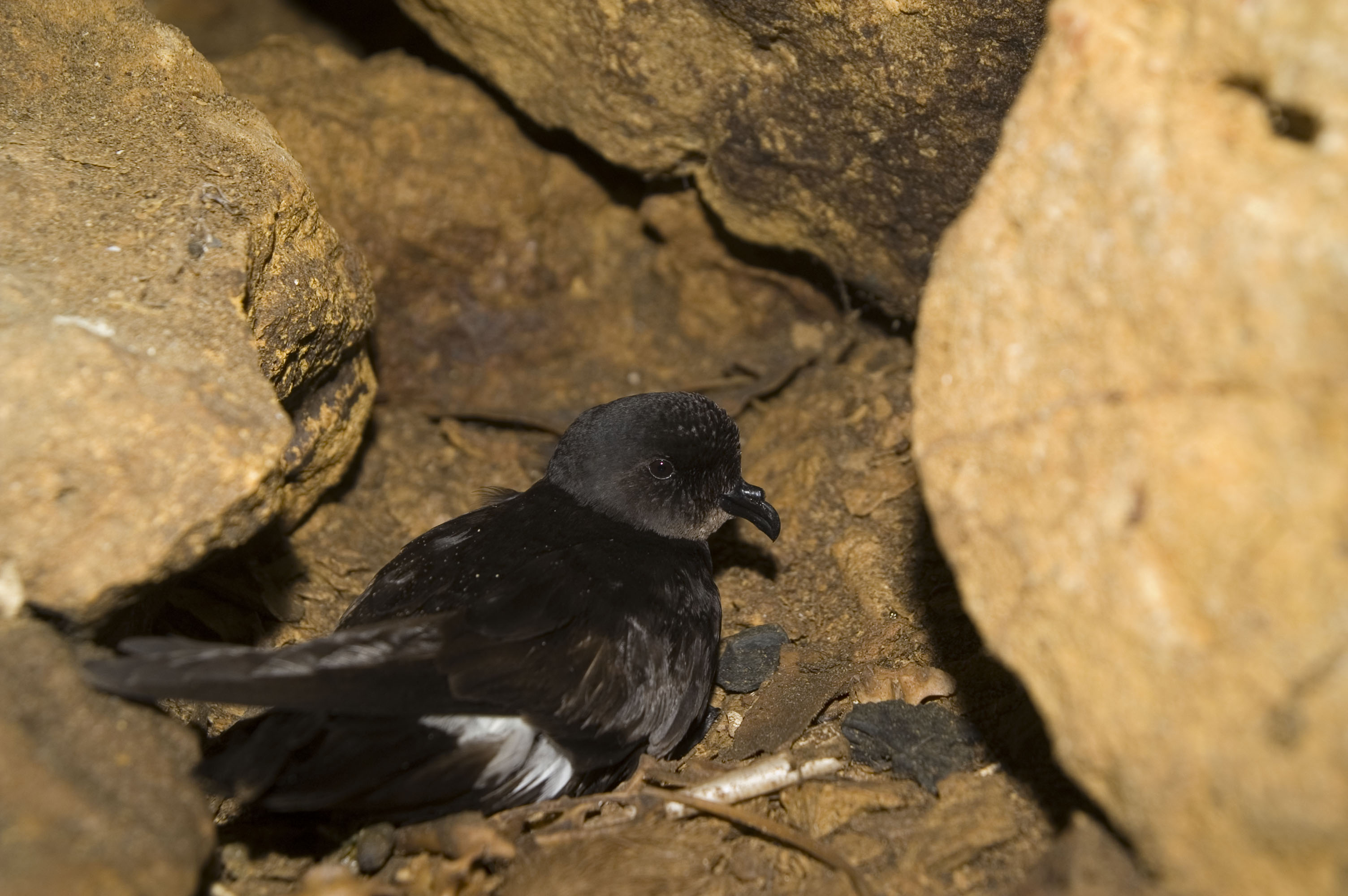
European storm petrel, Benidorm Island

== Shearwaters and petrels ==
Order: Procellariiformes Family: Procellariidae

The procellariids are the main group of medium-sized petrels and shearwaters, characterised by united nostrils with medium septum and a long outer functional primary.

- Northern fulmar (fulmar boreal), Fulmarus glacialis
- Cape petrel (petrel damero), Daption capense (R)
- Great-winged petrel (pardela de alas grandes), Pterodroma macroptera (R)
- Zino's petrel (petrel freira), Pterodroma madeira (R)
- Fea's petrel (petrel gongón), Pterodroma feae (R)
- Desertas petrel (petrel de las Desertas), Pterodroma deserta (R)
- Black-capped petrel (petrel antillano), Pterodroma hasitata (R)
- Scopoli's shearwater (pardela cenicienta mediterránea), Calonectris diomedea
- Cory's shearwater (pardela cenicienta atlántica), Calonectris borealis
- Cape Verde shearwater (pardela cenicienta de Cabo Verde), Calonectris edwardsii (R)
- Sooty shearwater (pardela sombría), Ardenna grisea
- Great shearwater (pardela capirotada), Ardenna gravis
- Manx shearwater (pardela pichoneta), Puffinus puffinus
- Yelkouan shearwater (pardela mediterránea), Puffinus yelkouan
- Balearic shearwater (pardela balear), Puffinus mauretanicus
- Barolo shearwater (pardela chica macaronésica), Puffinus baroli (R, except for Canary Islands)
- Boyd's shearwater (pardela chica de Cabo Verde), Puffinus boydi (R)
- Bulwer's petrel (petrel de Bulwer), Bulweria bulwerii (R, except for Canary Islands)
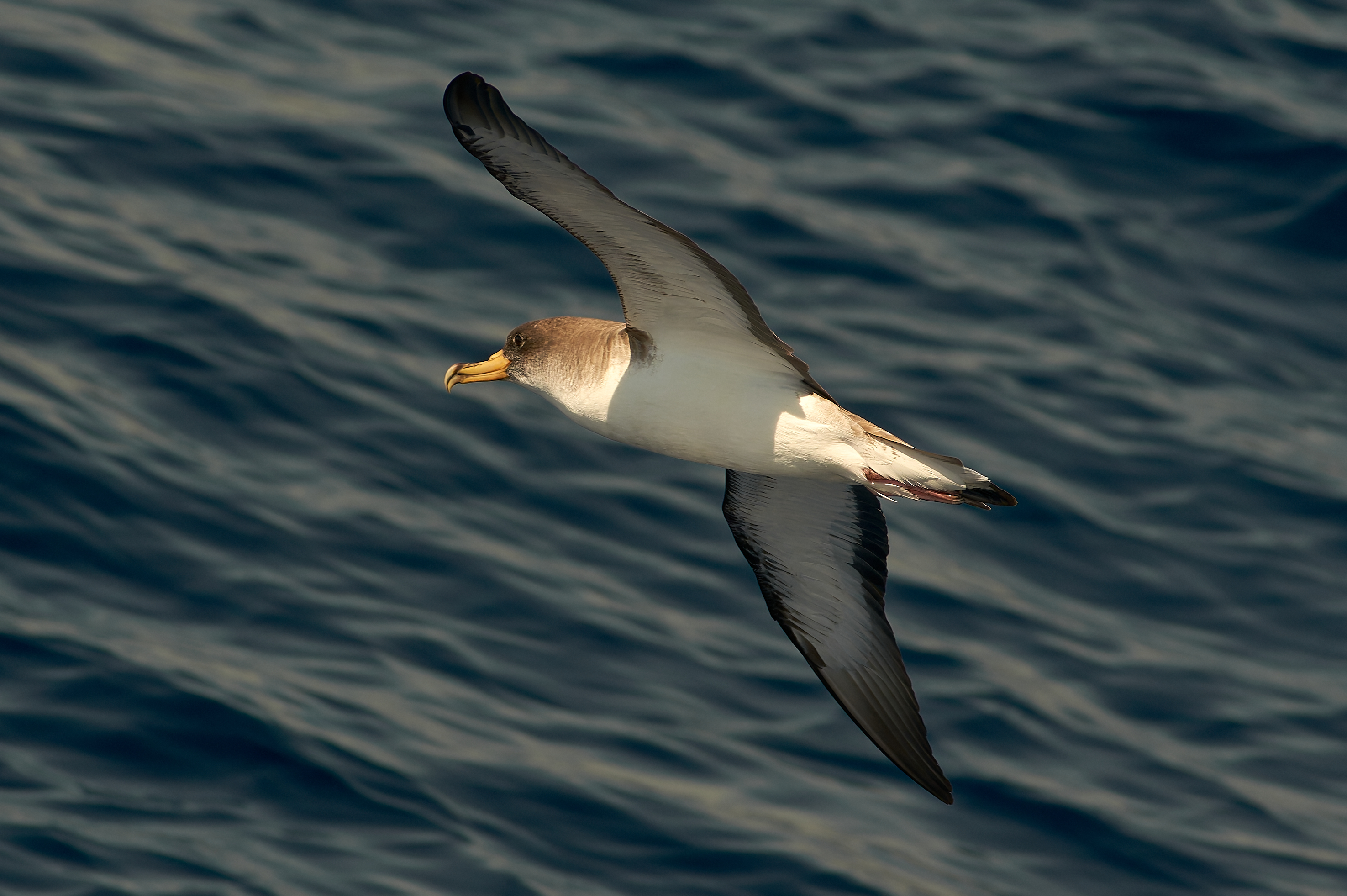
Cory's shearwater, La Gomera

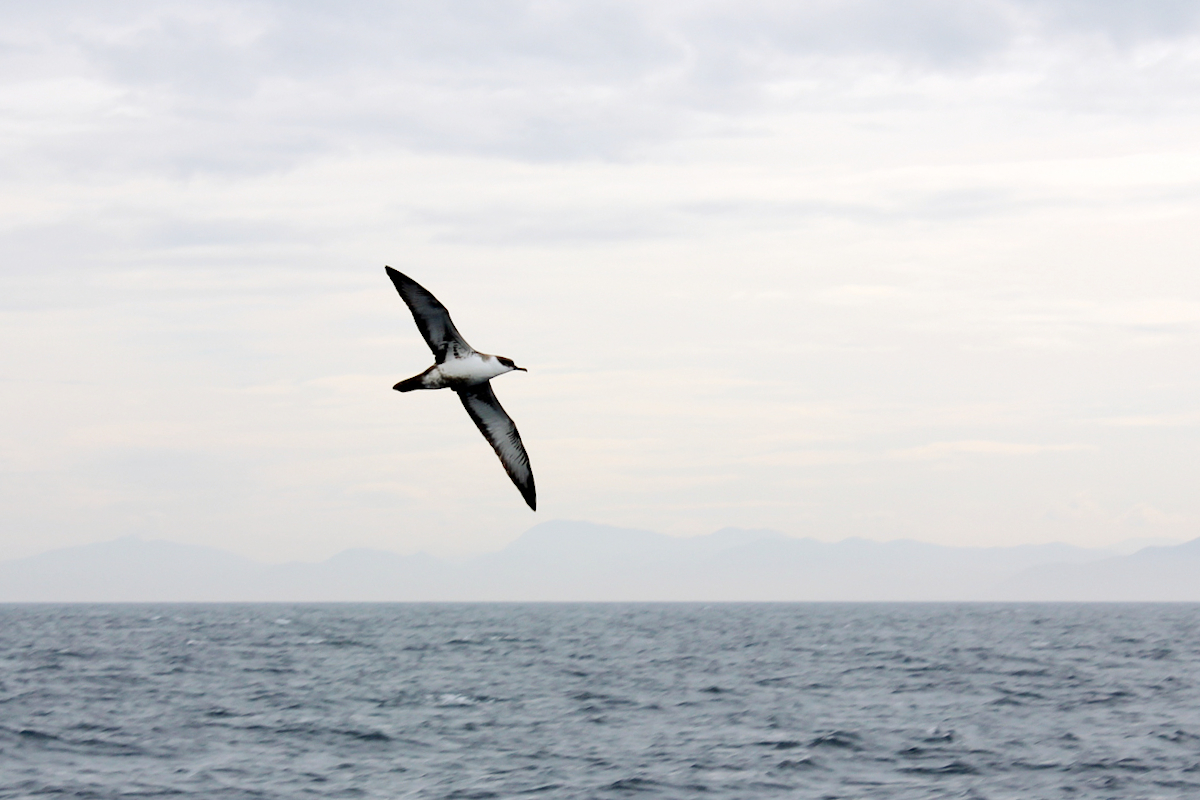
Great shearwater, off Bermeo, Bilbao

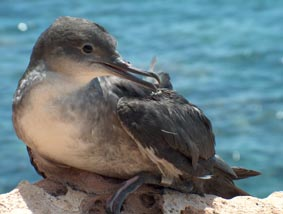
Balearic shearwater, Balearic Islands

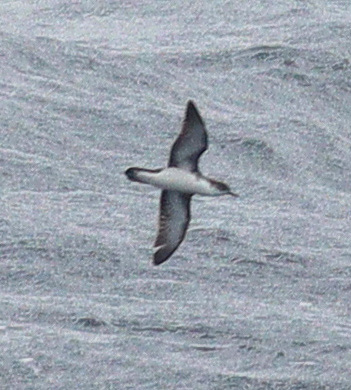
Boyd's shearwater, Canary Islands

== Storks ==
Order: Ciconiiformes Family: Ciconiidae

Storks are large, long-legged, long-necked, wetland birds with long, stout bills. Storks are mute, but bill-clattering is an important mode of communication at the nest. Their nests can be large and may be reused for many years. Many species are migratory.

- Black stork (cigüeña negra), Ciconia nigra
- White stork (cigüeña blanca), Ciconia ciconia
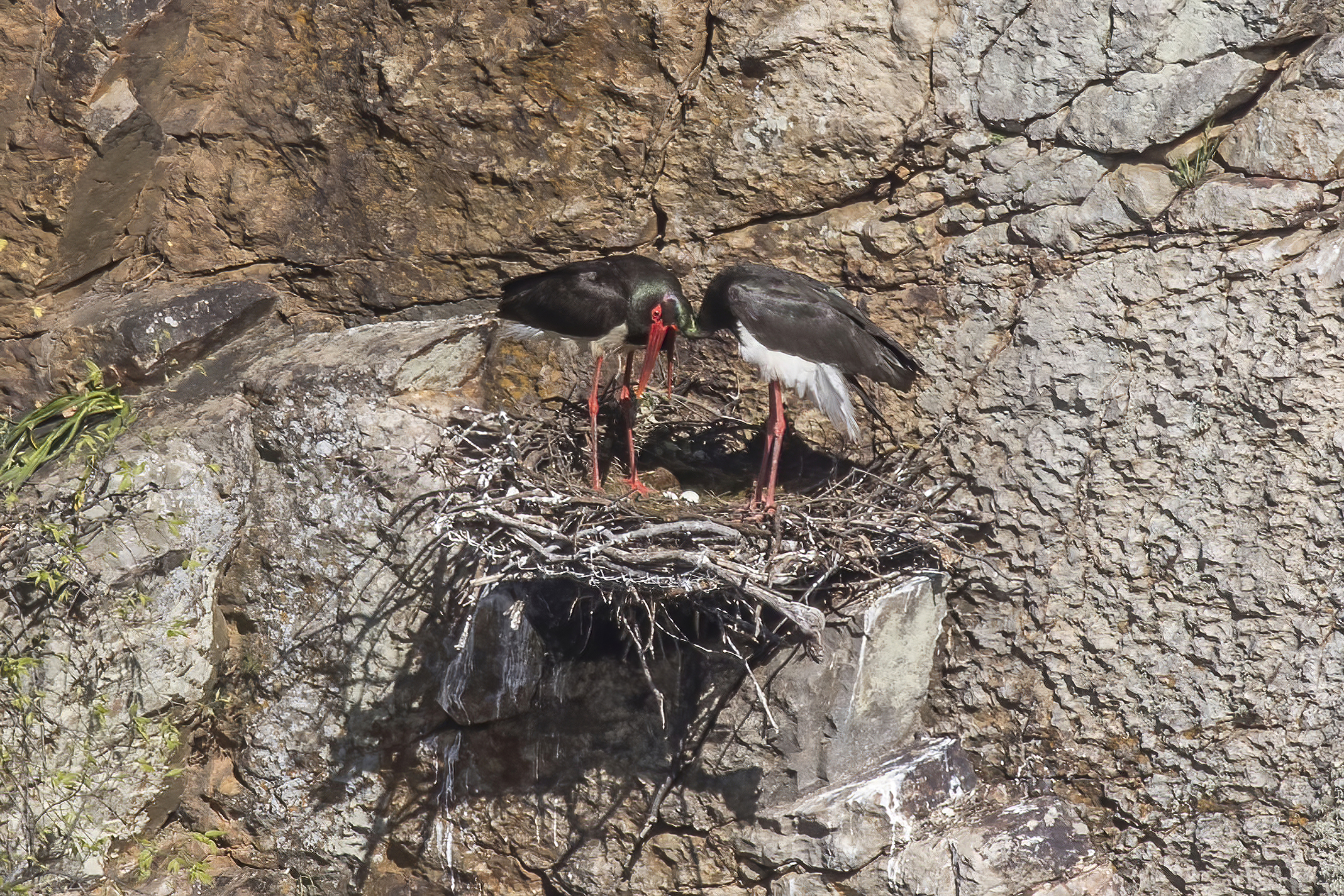
Black storks, Salto Del Gitano, Cáceres, Extremadura

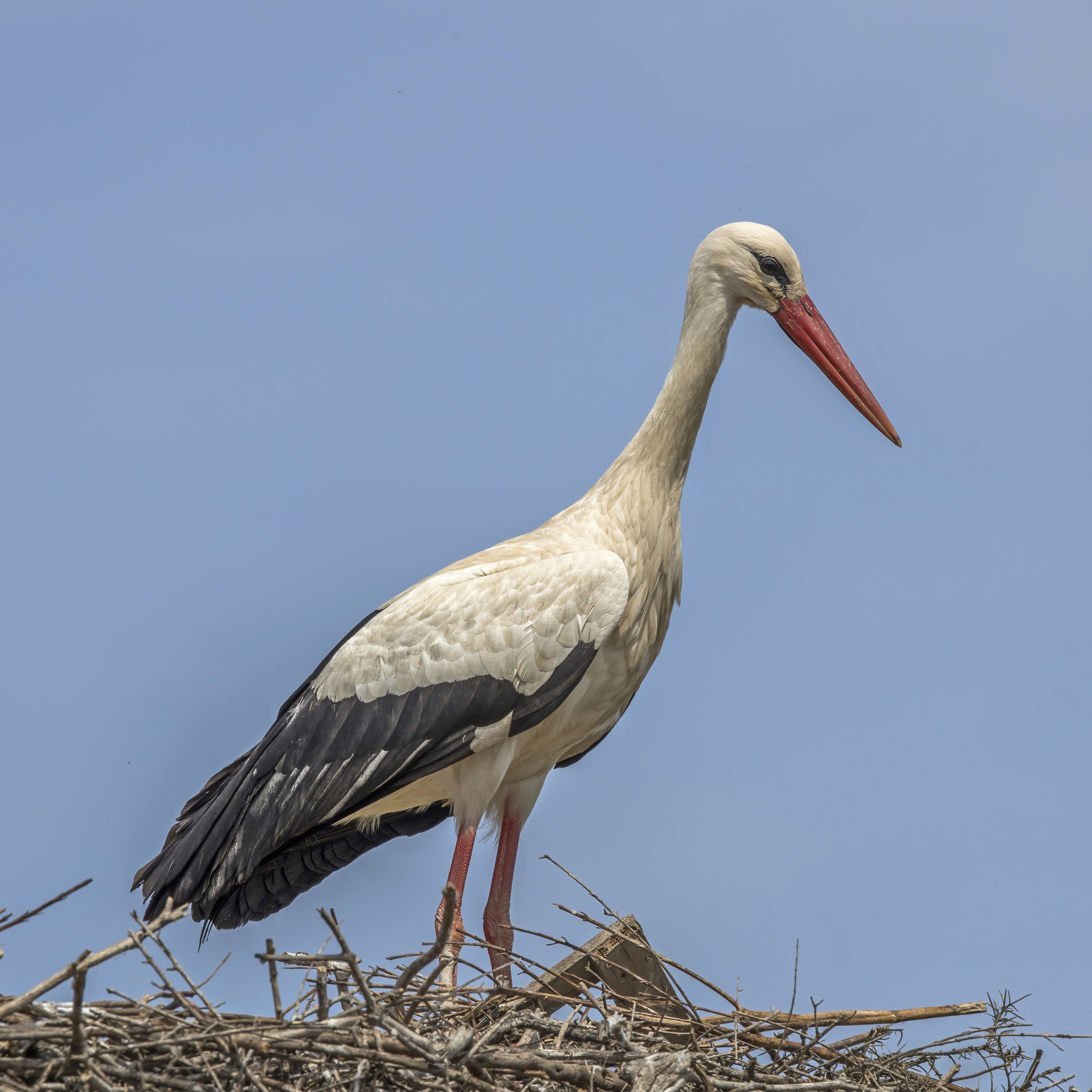
White stork, Huelva

== Frigatebirds ==
Order: Suliformes Family: Fregatidae

Frigatebirds are large seabirds usually found over tropical oceans. They are large, black, or black-and-white, with long wings and deeply forked tails. The males have red inflatable throat pouches. They do not swim or walk and cannot take off from a flat surface. Having the largest wingspan-to-body-weight ratio of any bird, they are essentially aerial, able to stay aloft for more than a week.

- Magnificent frigatebird (rabihorcado magnífico), Fregata magnificens (R)

== Boobies and gannets ==
Order: Suliformes Family: Sulidae

The sulids comprise the gannets and boobies. Both groups are medium to large coastal seabirds that plunge-dive for fish.

- Northern gannet (alcatraz atlántico), Morus bassanus
- Masked booby (piquero enmascarado), Sula dactylatra (R)
- Red-footed booby (piquero patirrojo), Sula sula (R)
- Brown booby (piquero pardo), Sula leucogaster (R)

== Cormorants and shags ==
Order: Suliformes Family: Phalacrocoracidae

Phalacrocoracidae is a family of medium to large coastal, fish-eating seabirds that includes cormorants and shags. Plumage colouration varies, with the majority having mainly dark plumage, some species being black-and-white and a few being colourful.

- Pygmy cormorant (cormorán pigmeo), Microcarbo pygmeus (R)
- Great cormorant (cormorán grande), Phalacrocorax carbo
- European shag (cormorán moñudo), Gulosus aristotelis
- Double-crested cormorant (cormorán orejudo), Nannopterum auritum (R)
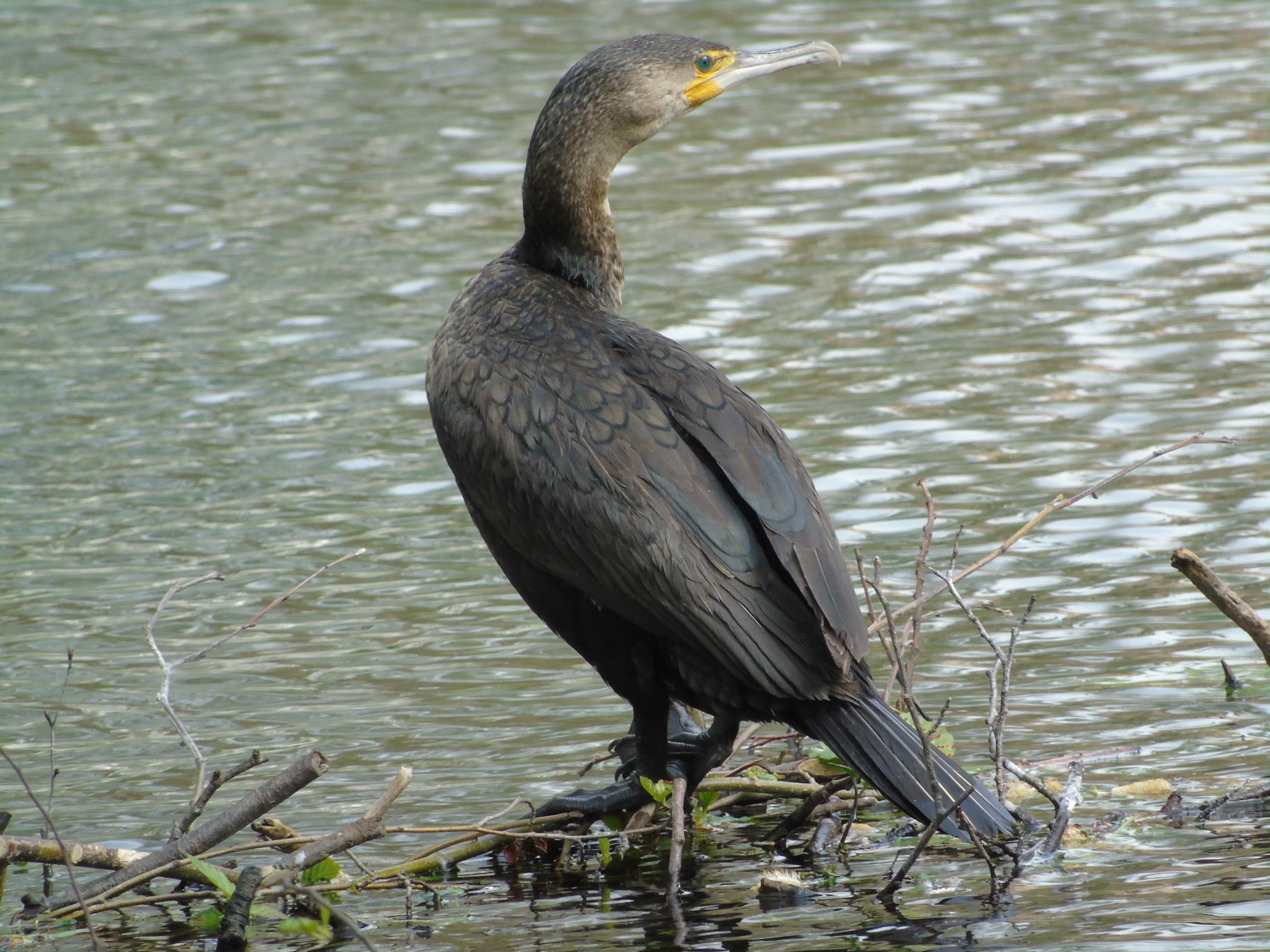
Great cormorant, Arteixo, A Coruña

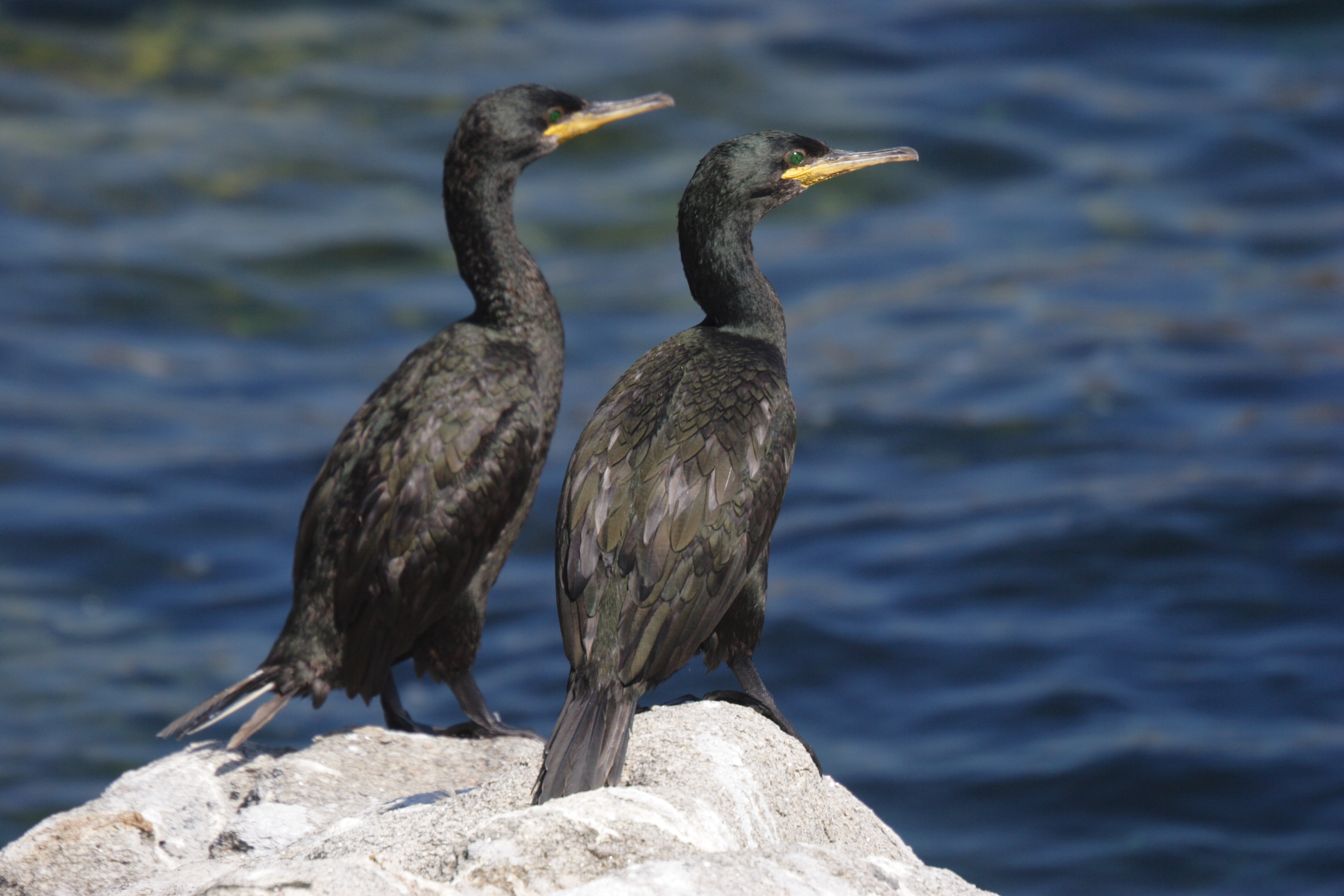
European shag, Islas Cíes, Galicia

== Ibises and spoonbills ==
Order: Pelecaniformes Family: Threskiornithidae

Threskiornithidae is a family of large terrestrial and wading birds which includes the ibises and spoonbills. They have long, broad wings with 11 primary and about 20 secondary feathers. They are strong fliers and despite their size and weight, very capable soarers.

- African sacred ibis (ibis sagrado), Threskiornis aethiopicus (C)
- Northern bald ibis (ibis eremita), Geronticus eremita (B C)
- Glossy ibis (morito común), Plegadis falcinellus
- Eurasian spoonbill (espátula común), Platalea leucorodia
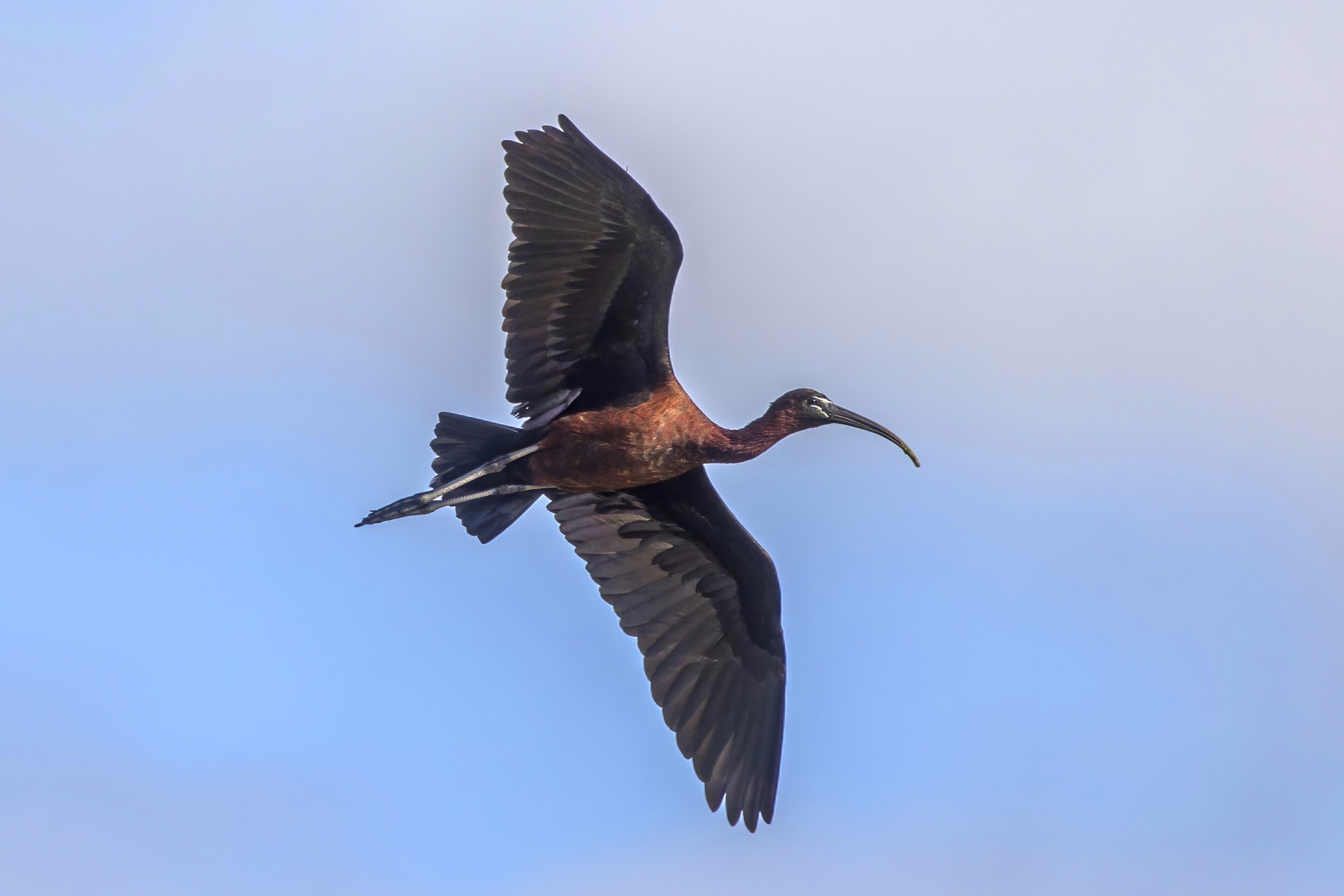
Glossy ibis, El Rocío, Huelva

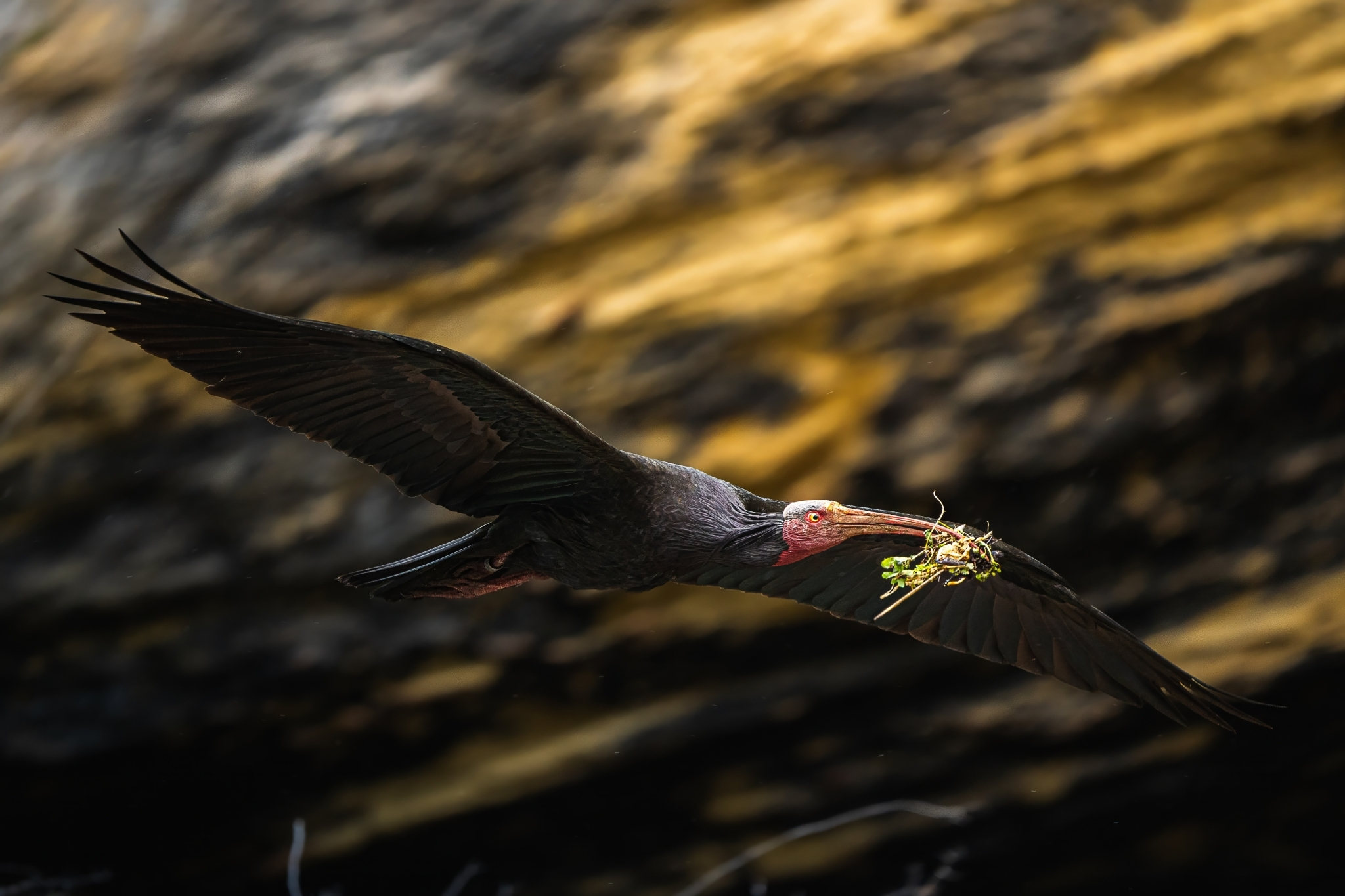
Northern bald ibis, near Cádiz, Andalusia (reintroduced)

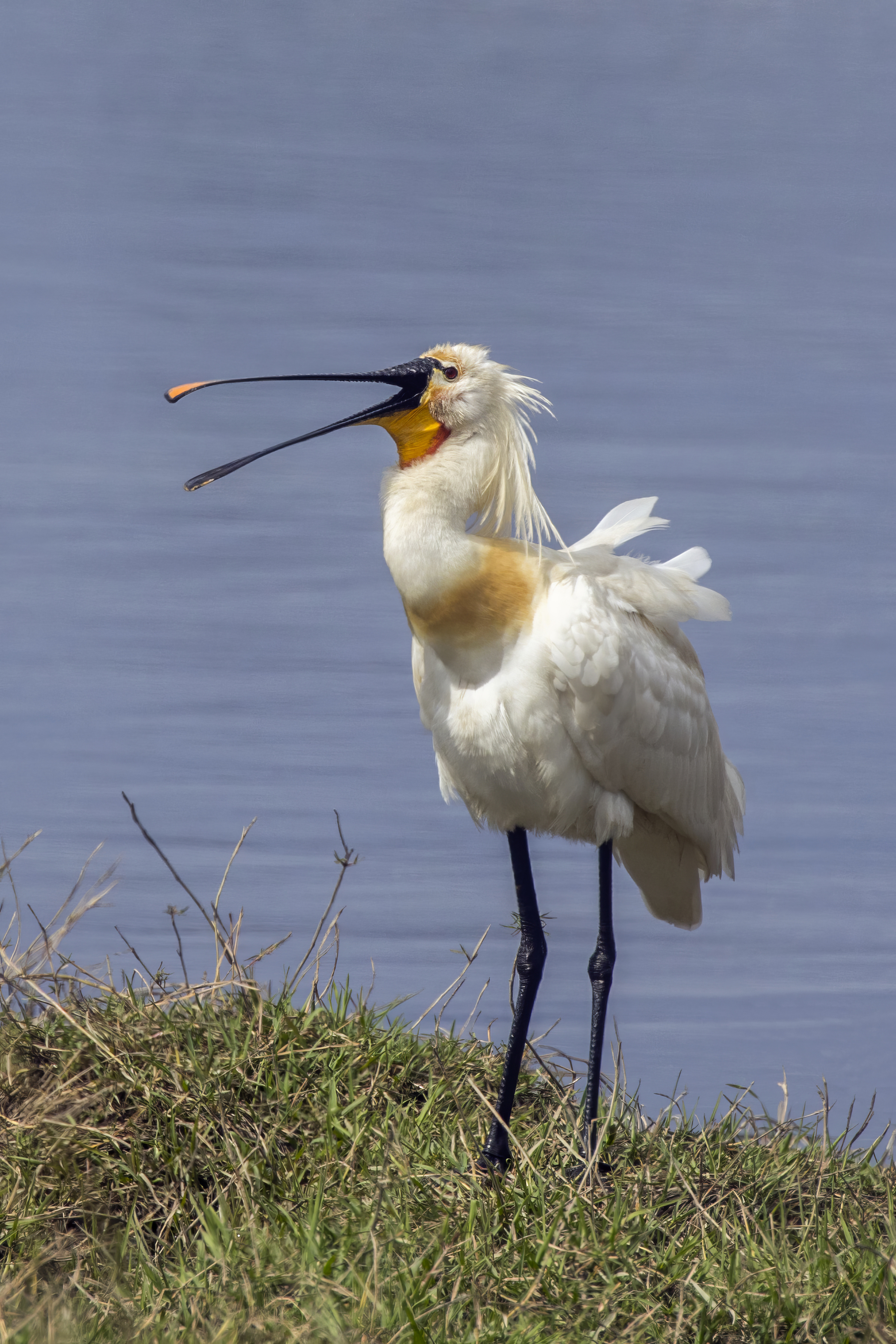
Eurasian spoonbill, near Almonte

== Heron, egrets, and bitterns ==
Order: Pelecaniformes Family: Ardeidae

The family Ardeidae contains the bitterns, herons and egrets. Herons and egrets are medium to large wading birds with long necks and legs. Bitterns tend to be shorter necked and more wary. Members of Ardeidae fly with their necks retracted, unlike other long-necked birds such as storks, ibises and spoonbills.

- Great bittern (avetoro común), Botaurus stellaris
- American bittern (avetoro lentiginoso), Botaurus lentiginosus (R)
- Little bittern (avetorillo común), Botaurus minutus
- Dwarf bittern (avetorillo plomizo), Botaurus sturmii (R)
- Black-crowned night heron (martinete común), Nycticorax nycticorax
- Green heron (garcilla verde), Butorides virescens (R)
- Squacco heron (garcilla cangrejera), Ardeola ralloides
- Western cattle egret (garcilla bueyera), Ardea ibis
- Grey heron (garza real), Ardea cinerea
- Great blue heron (garza azulada), Ardea herodias (R)
- Purple heron (garza imperial), Ardea purpurea
- Great egret (garceta grande), Ardea alba
- Tricolored heron (garceta tricolor), Egretta tricolor (R)
- Little egret (garceta común), Egretta garzetta
- Western reef heron (garceta dimorfa), Egretta gularis (R)
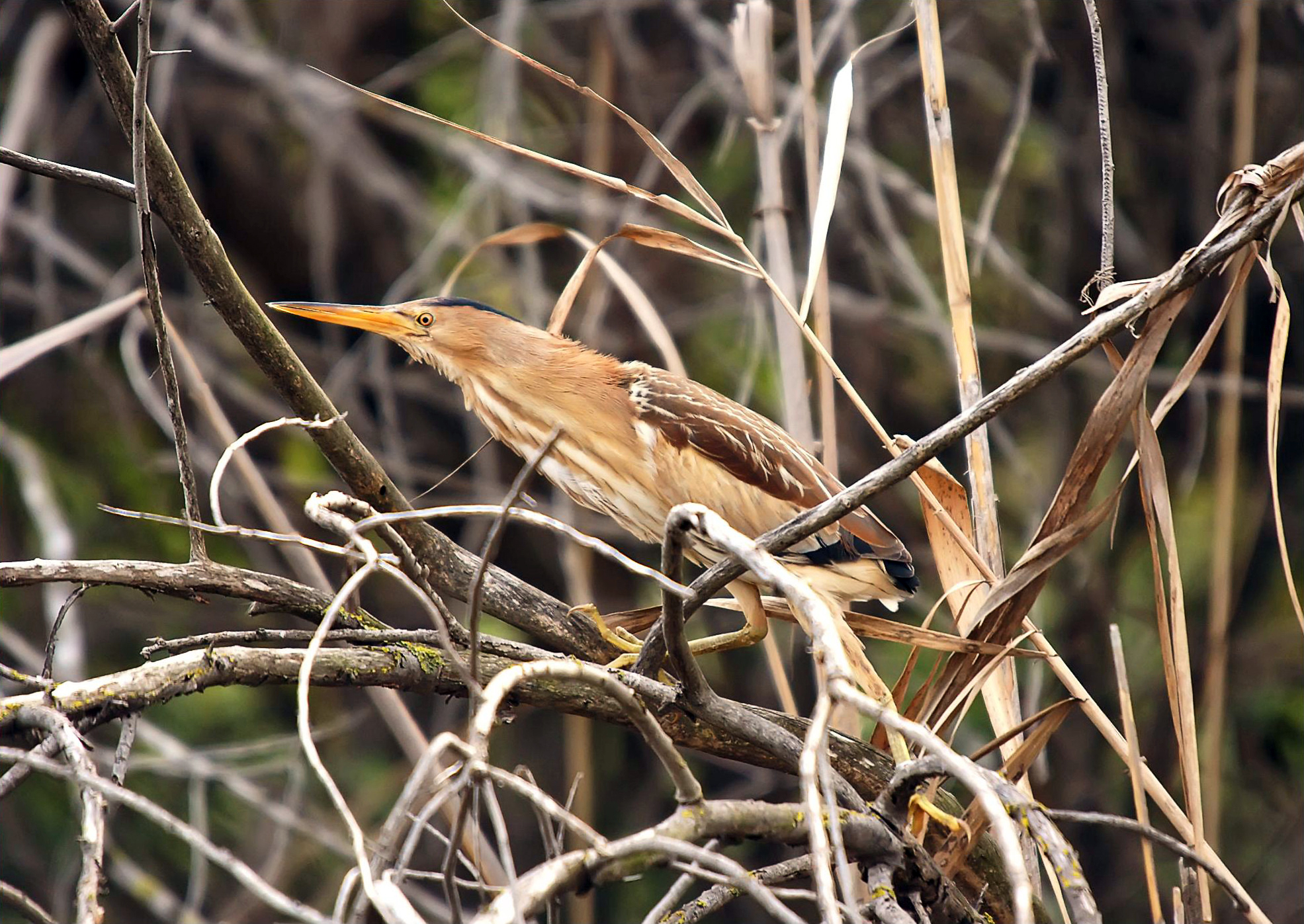
Little bittern, Barcelona

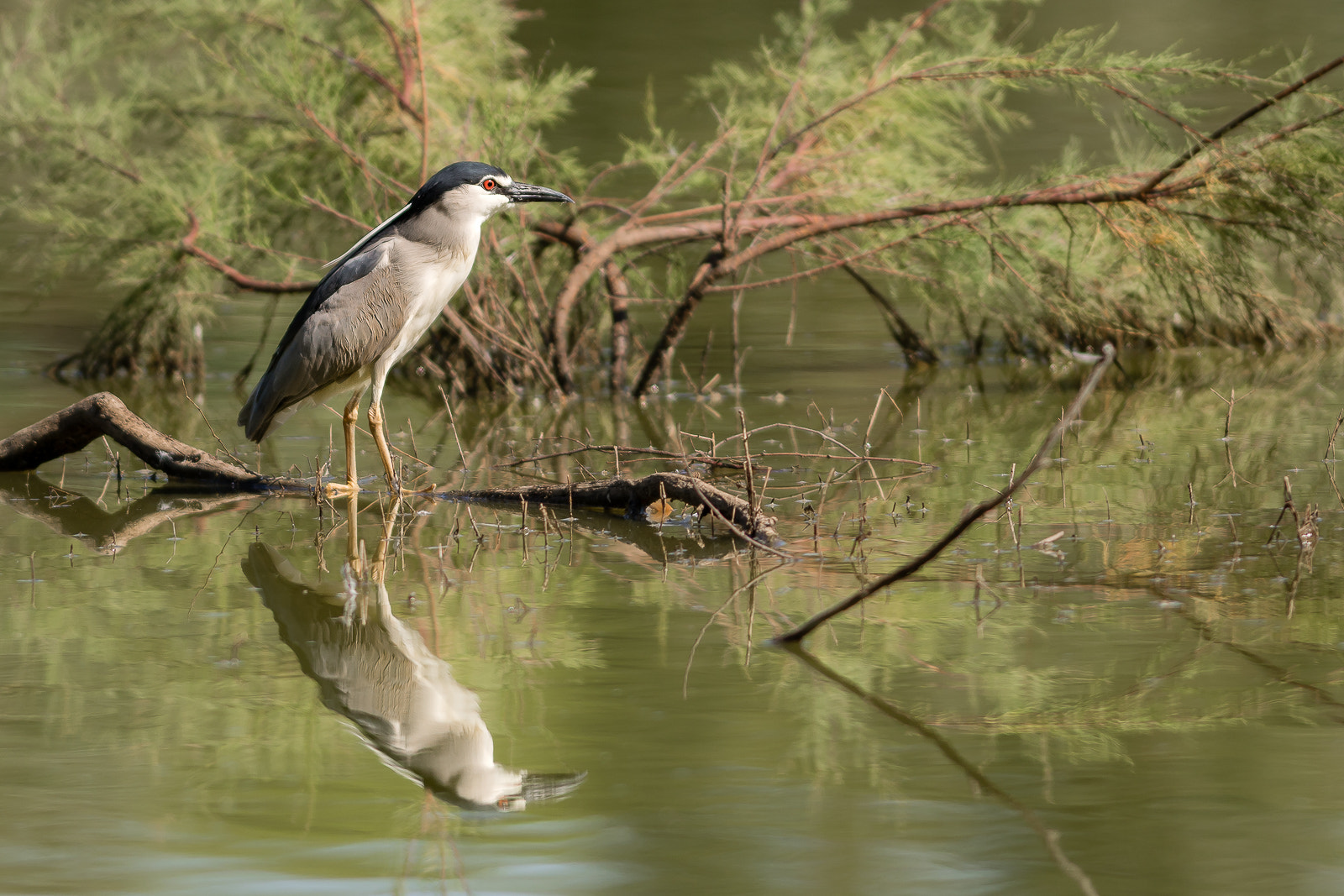
Black-crowned night heron, Dehesa de abajo, Seville

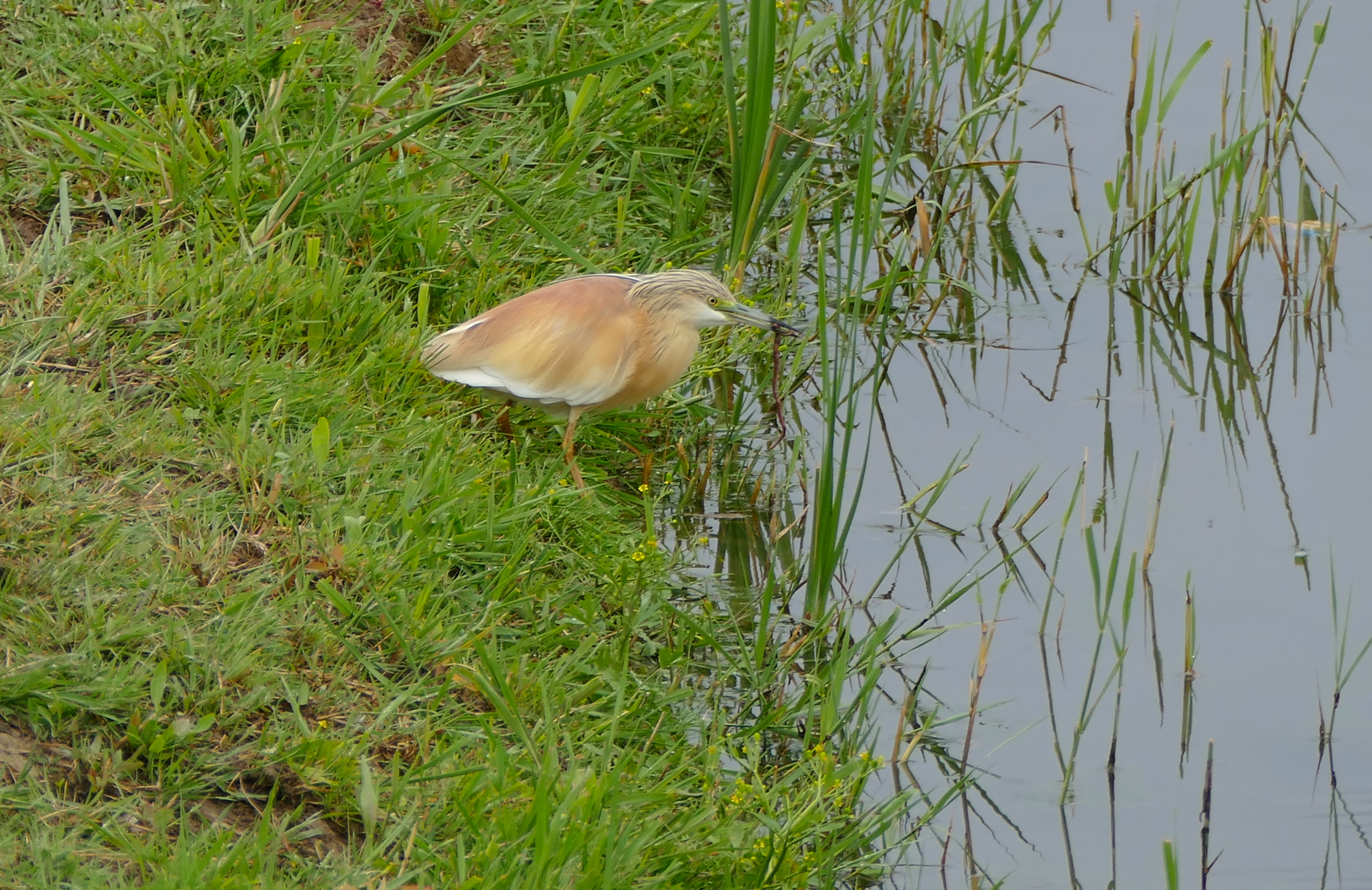
Squacco heron, Catalonia

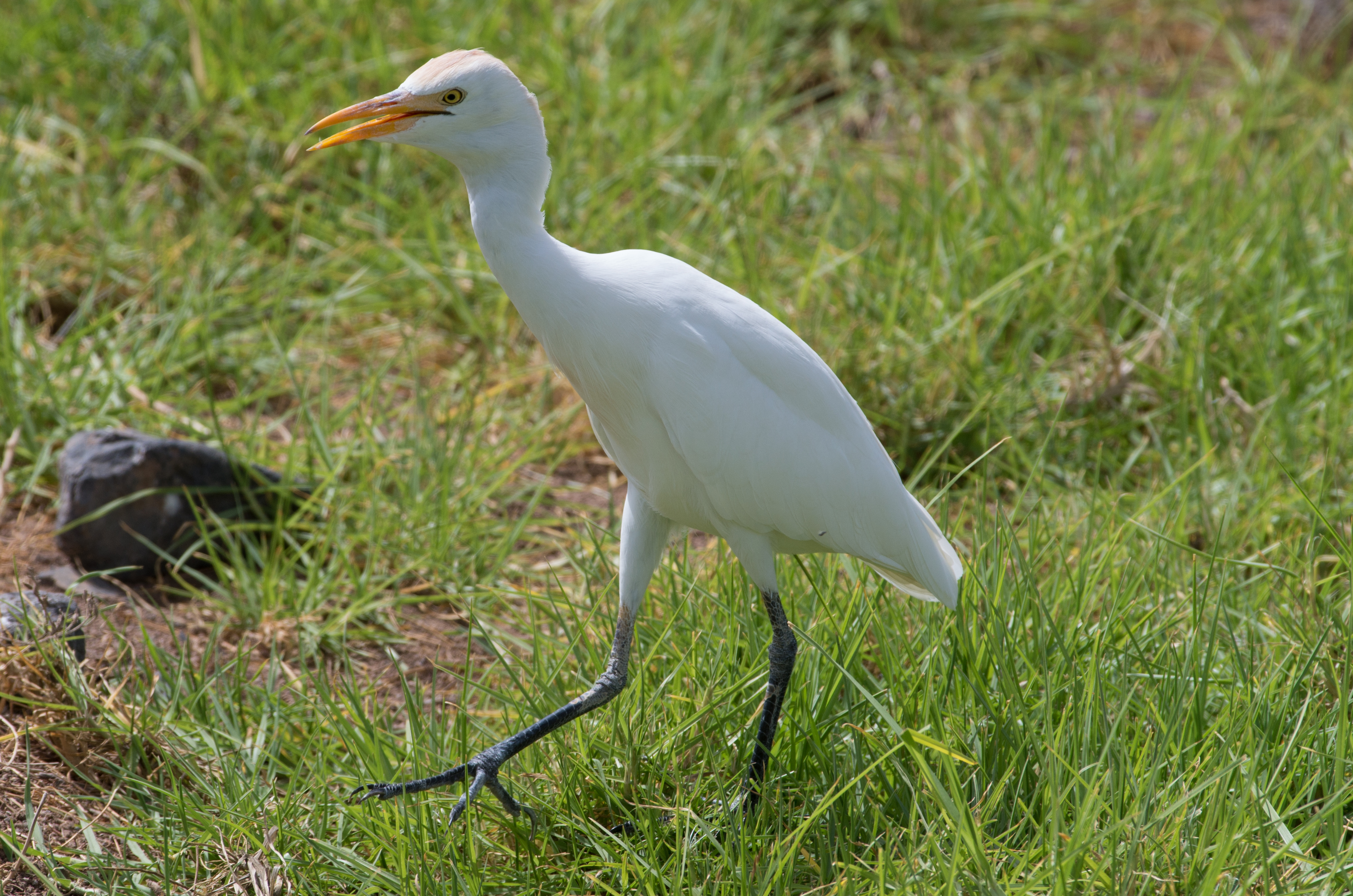
Western cattle egret, Morro Jable, Fuerteventura

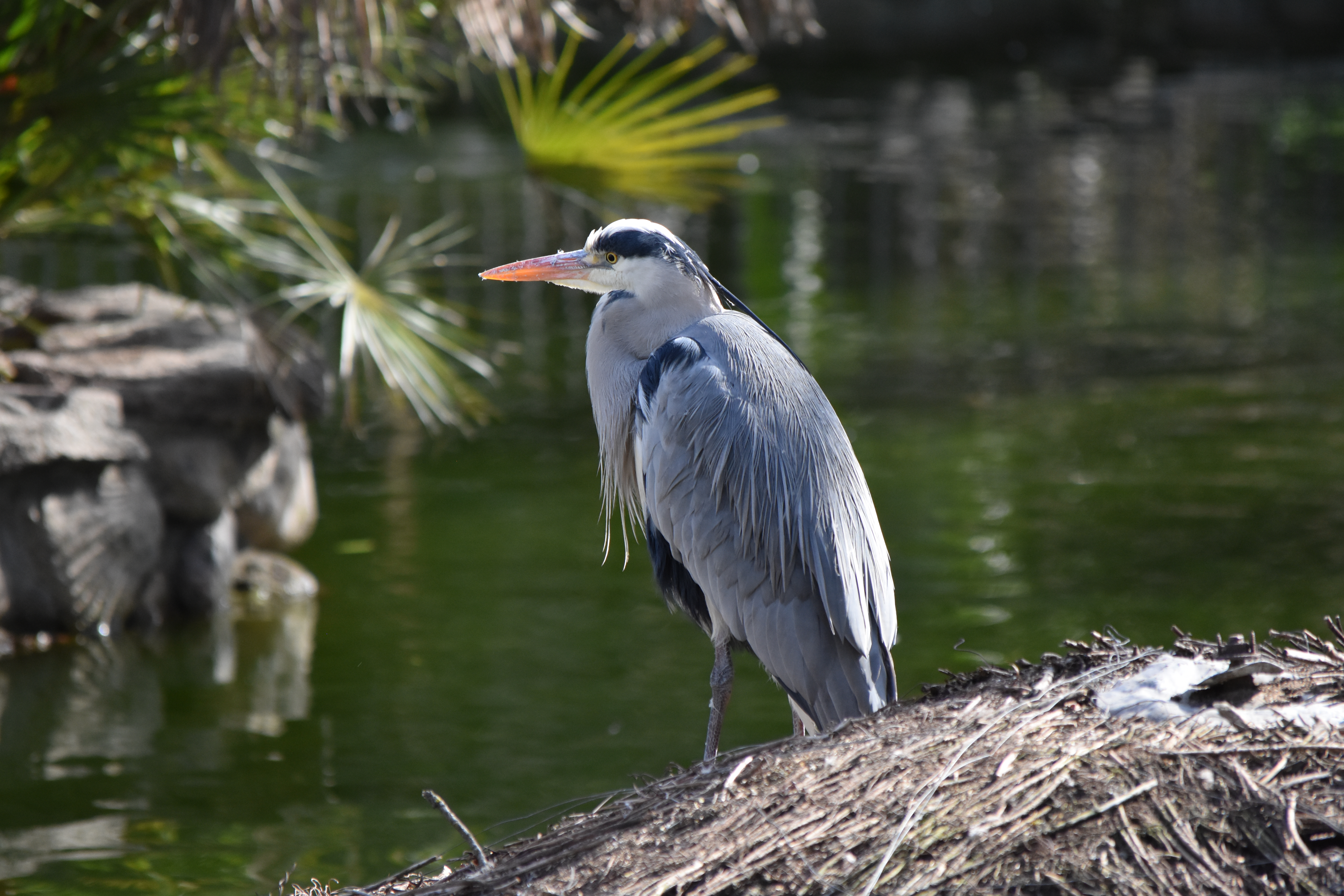
Grey heron, Madrid

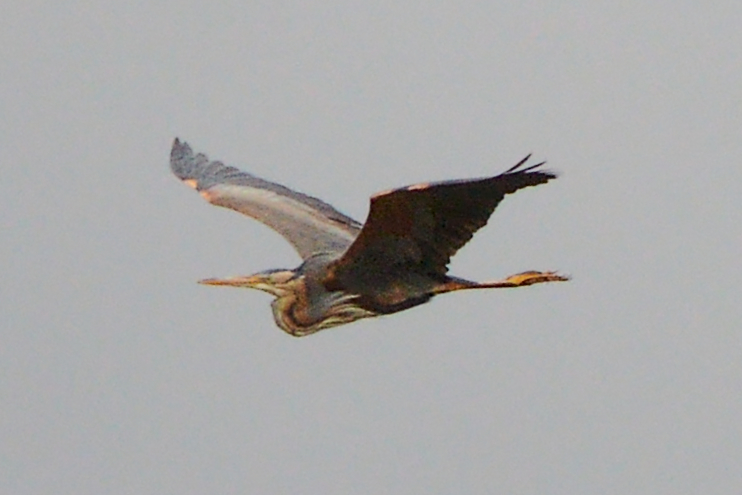
Purple heron, Albufera Natural Park, Palma de Mallorca

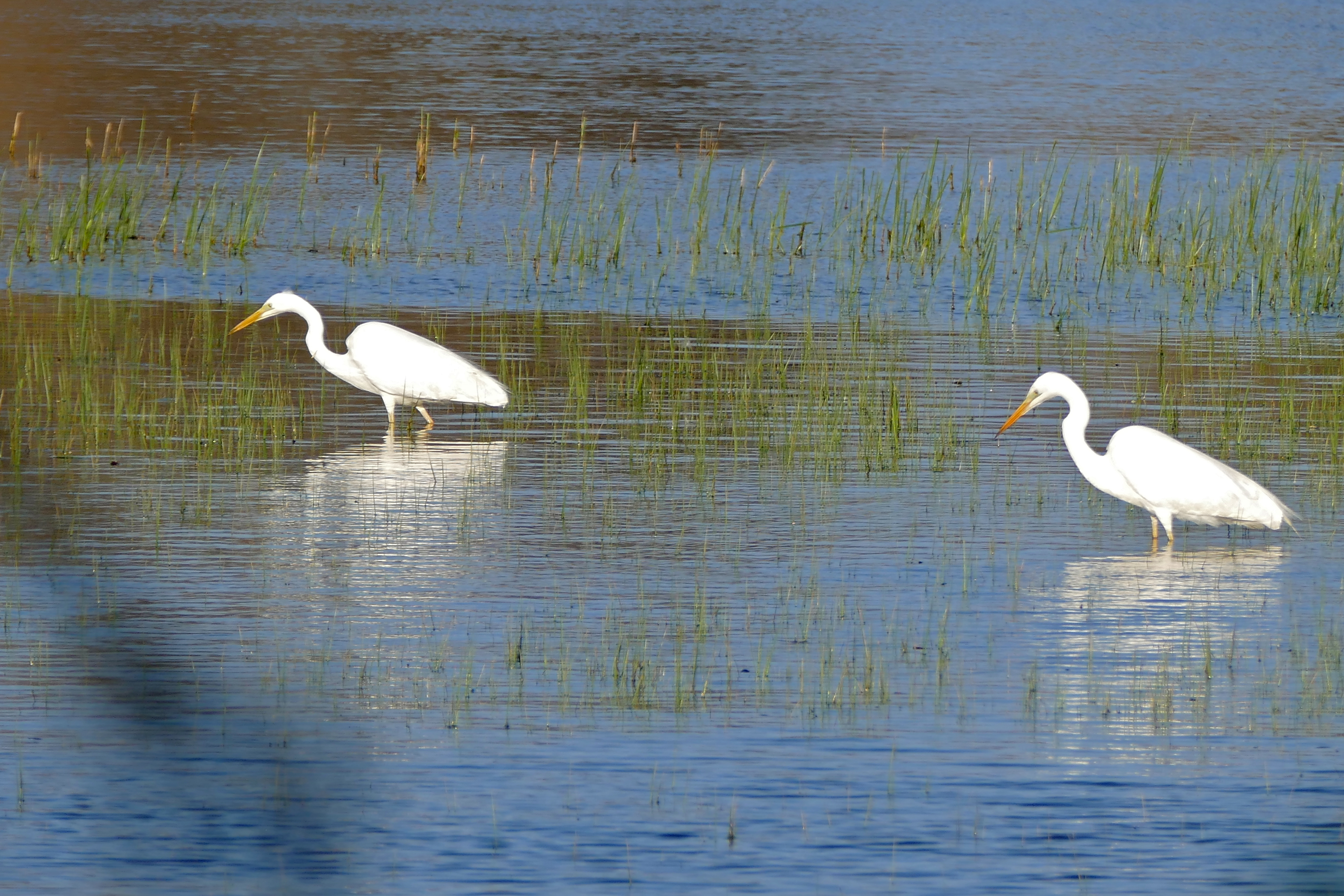
Great egrets, Catalonia

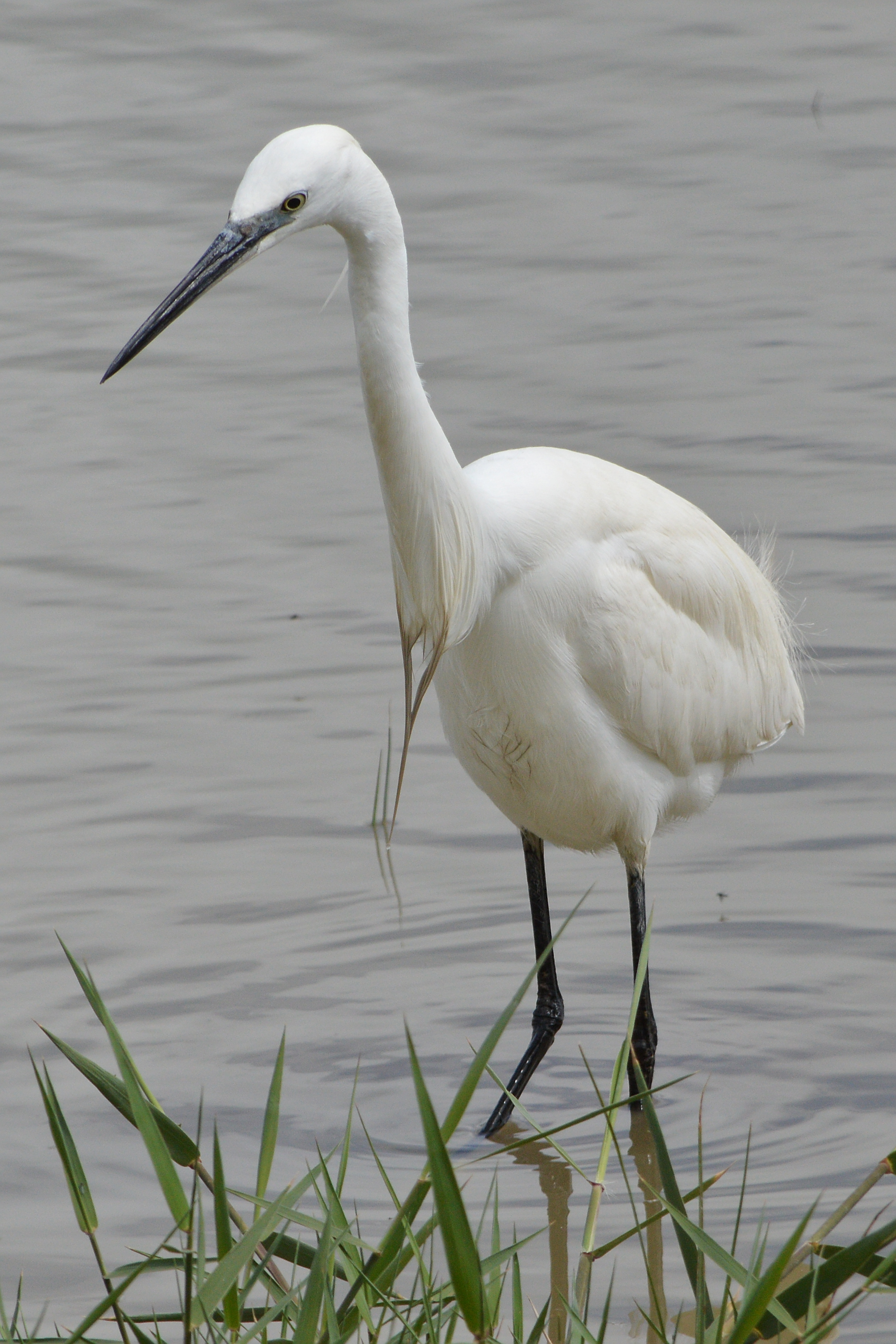
Little egret, Albufera Natural Park, Palma de Mallorca

== Pelicans ==
Order: Pelecaniformes Family: Pelecanidae

Pelicans are large water birds with a distinctive pouch under their beak. As with other members of the order Pelecaniformes, they have webbed feet with four toes.

- Great white pelican (pelícano común), Pelecanus onocrotalus (R)

== Osprey ==
Order: Accipitriformes Family: Pandionidae

The family Pandionidae contains only one species, the osprey. The osprey is a medium-large raptor which is a specialist fish-eater with a worldwide distribution.

- Osprey (águila pescadora), Pandion haliaetus
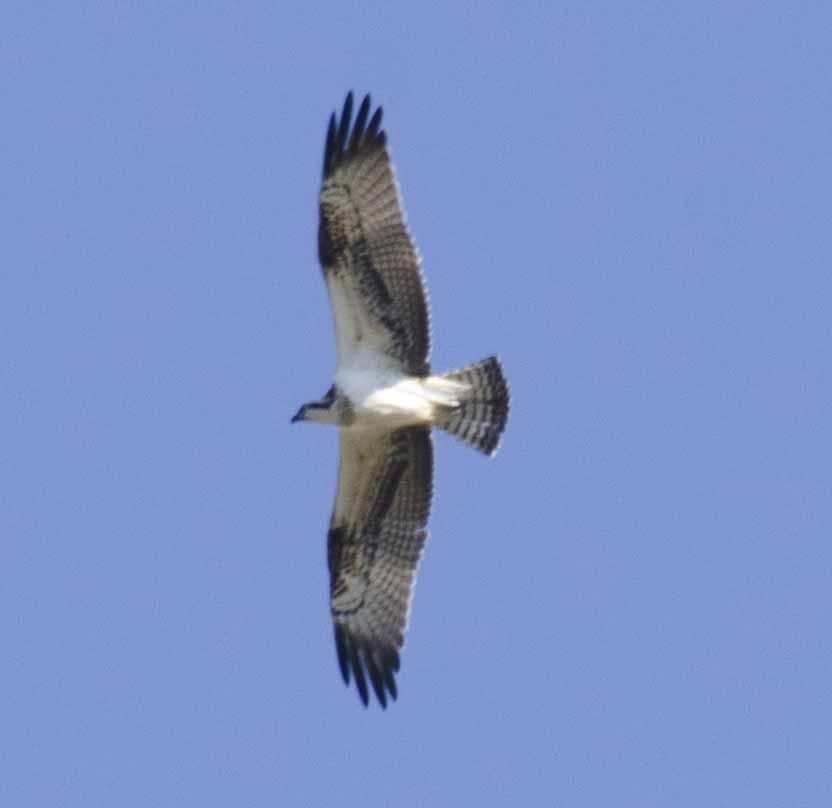
Osprey, Mallorca

== Hawks, eagles, and kites ==
Order: Accipitriformes Family: Accipitridae

Accipitridae is a family of birds of prey, which includes hawks, eagles, kites, harriers and Old World vultures. These birds have powerful hooked beaks for tearing flesh from their prey, strong legs, powerful talons and keen eyesight.

- Black-winged kite (elanio común), Elanus caeruleus
- Bearded vulture (quebrantahuesos), Gypaetus barbatus
- Egyptian vulture (alimoche común), Neophron percnopterus
- European honey buzzard (abejero europeo), Pernis apivorus
- Swallow-tailed kite (elanio tijereta), Elanoides forficatus (R)
- White-backed vulture (buitre dorsiblanco africano), Gyps africanus (R)
- Rüppell's vulture (buitre moteado), Gyps rueppelli
- Griffon vulture (buitre leonado), Gyps fulvus
- Black vulture (buitre negro), Aegypius monachus
- Short-toed snake eagle (culebrera europea), Circaetus gallicus
- Bateleur (águila volatinera), Terathopius ecaudatus (R)
- Lesser spotted eagle (águila pomerana), Clanga pomarina (R)
- Greater spotted eagle (águila moteada), Clanga clanga (R)
- Booted eagle (águila calzada), Hieraaetus pennatus
- Steppe eagle (águila esteparia), Aquila nipalensis (R)
- Spanish imperial eagle (águila imperial ibérica), Aquila adalberti
- Eastern imperial eagle (águila imperial oriental), Aquila heliaca (R)
- Golden eagle (águila real), Aquila chrysaetos
- Bonelli's eagle (águila perdicera), Aquila fasciata
- Eurasian sparrowhawk (gavilán común), Accipiter nisus
- Eurasian goshawk (azor común), Astur gentilis
- Western marsh harrier (aguilucho lagunero occidental), Circus aeruginosus
- Hen harrier (aguilucho pálido), Circus cyaneus
- Pallid harrier (aguilucho papialbo), Circus macrourus
- Montagu's harrier (aguilucho cenizo), Circus pygargus
- Red kite (milano real), Milvus milvus
- Black kite (milano negro), Milvus migrans
- Yellow-billed kite (milano piquigualdo), Milvus aegyptius (R)
- White-tailed eagle (pigargo europeo), Haliaeetus albicilla (R except for reintroduced birds)
- Rough-legged buzzard (busardo calzado), Buteo lagopus (R)
- Long-legged buzzard (busardo moro), Buteo rufinus (R except for North African enclaves)
- Common buzzard (busardo ratonero), Buteo buteo
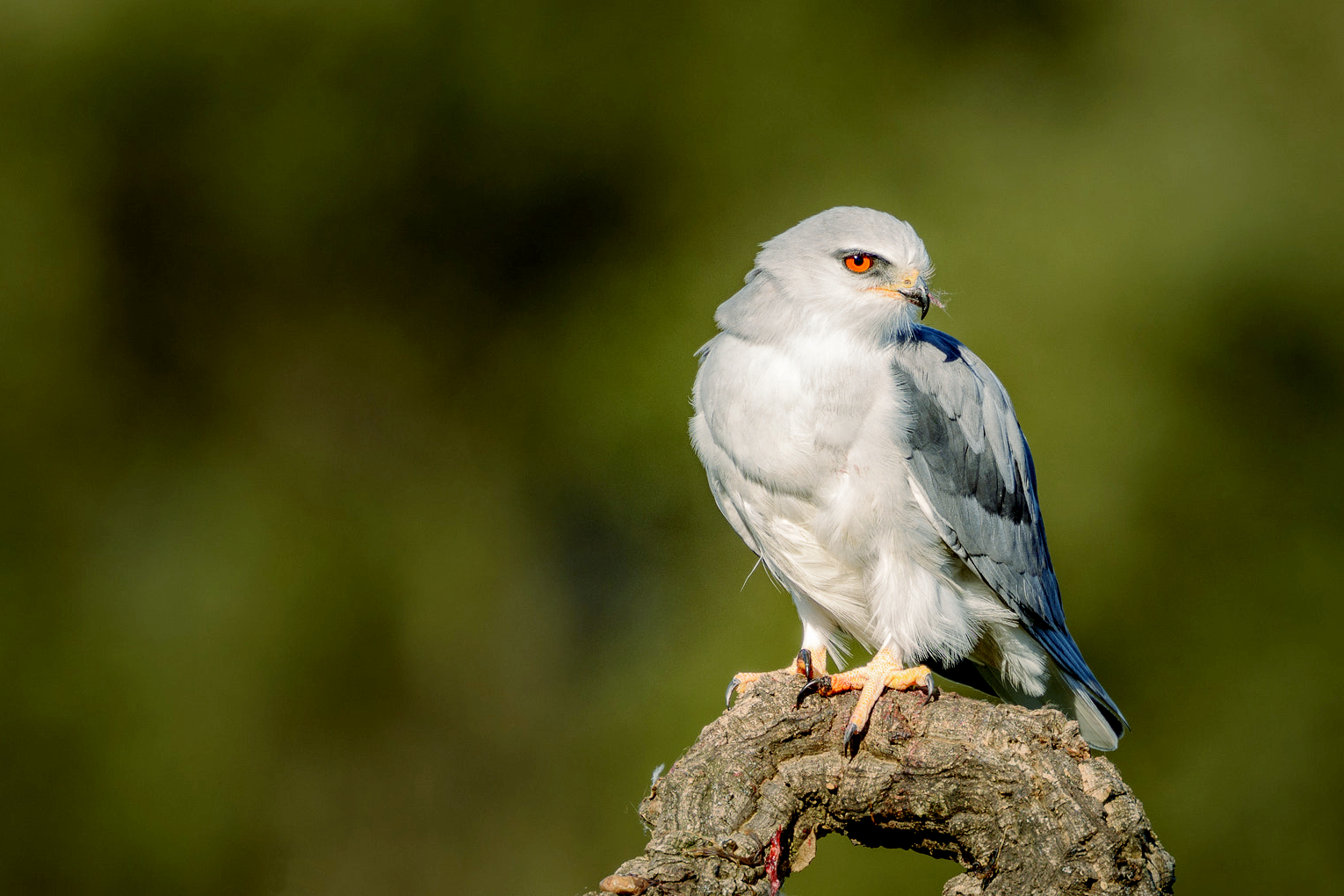
Black-winged kite, Calera y Chozas, Toledo, Castilla–La Mancha

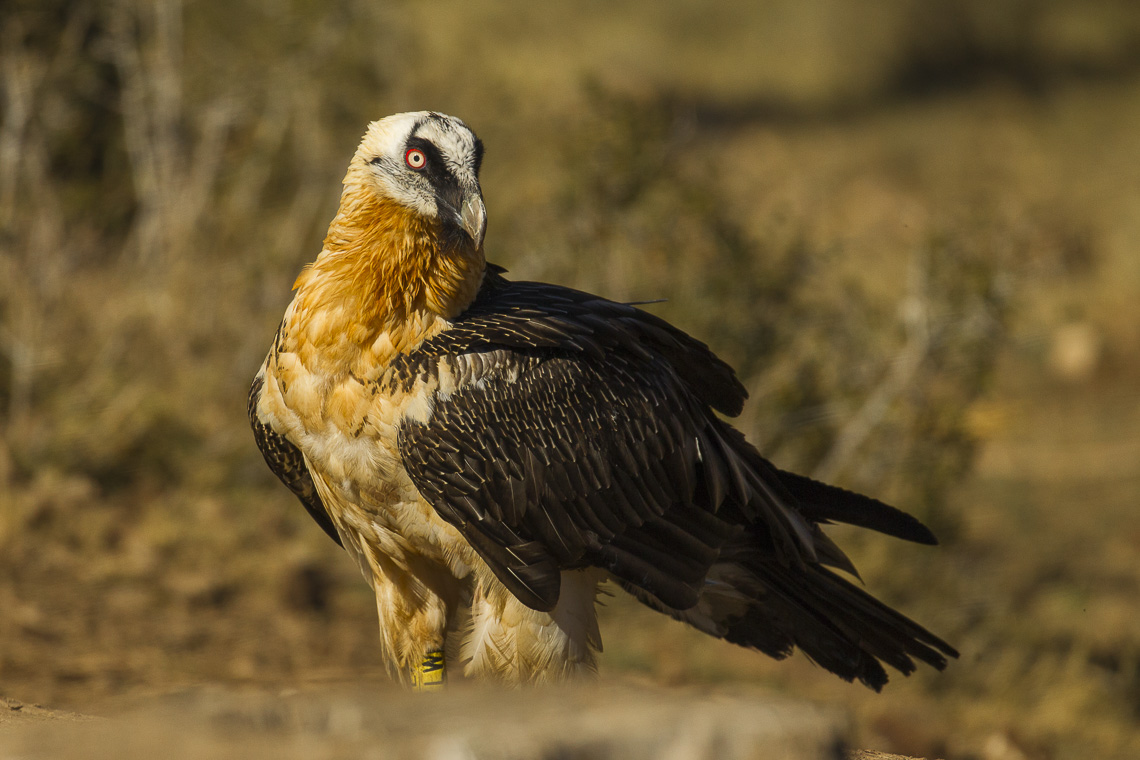
Bearded vulture, Pyrenees, Catalonia

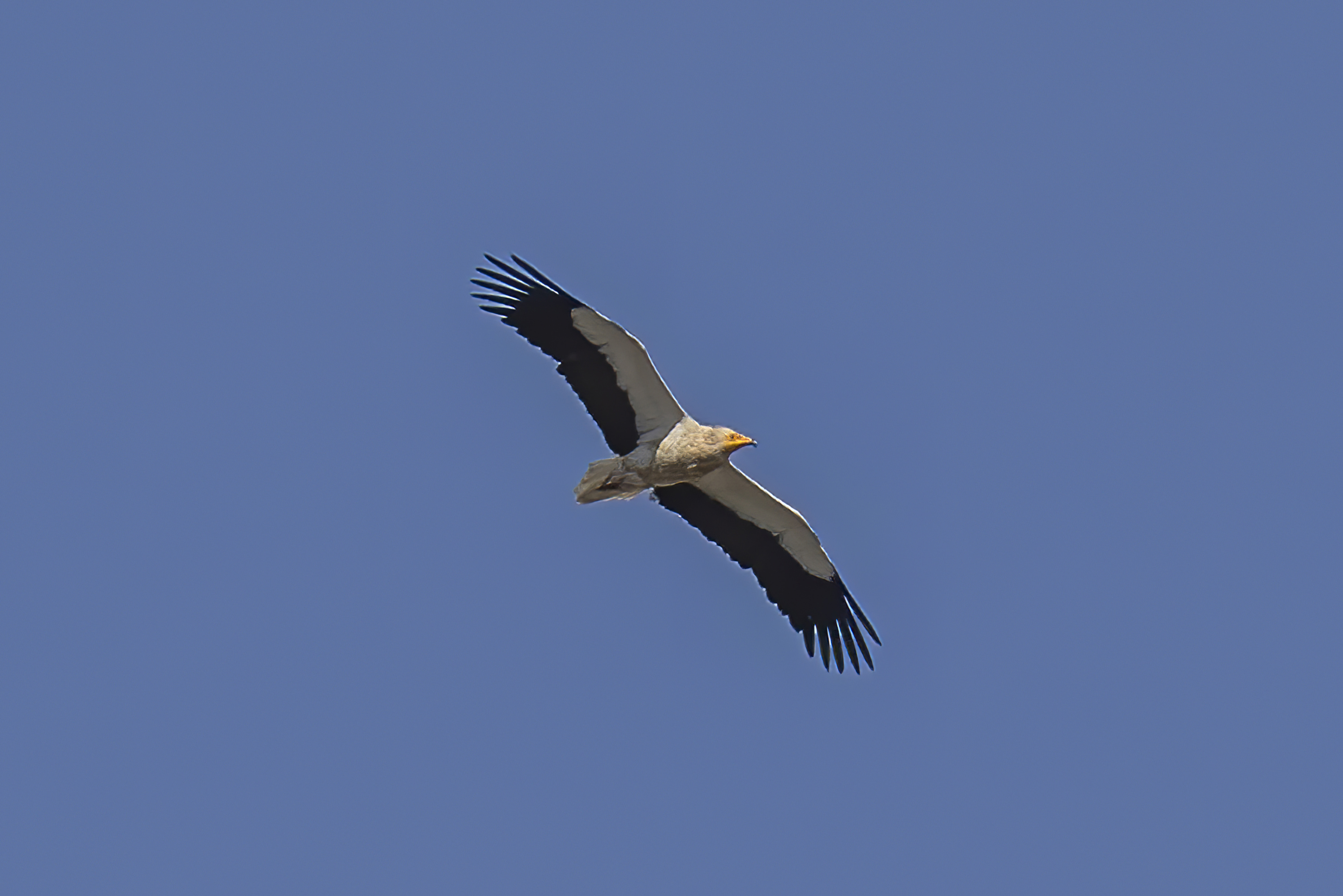
Egyptian vulture, Salto Del Gitano, Cáceres, Extremadura

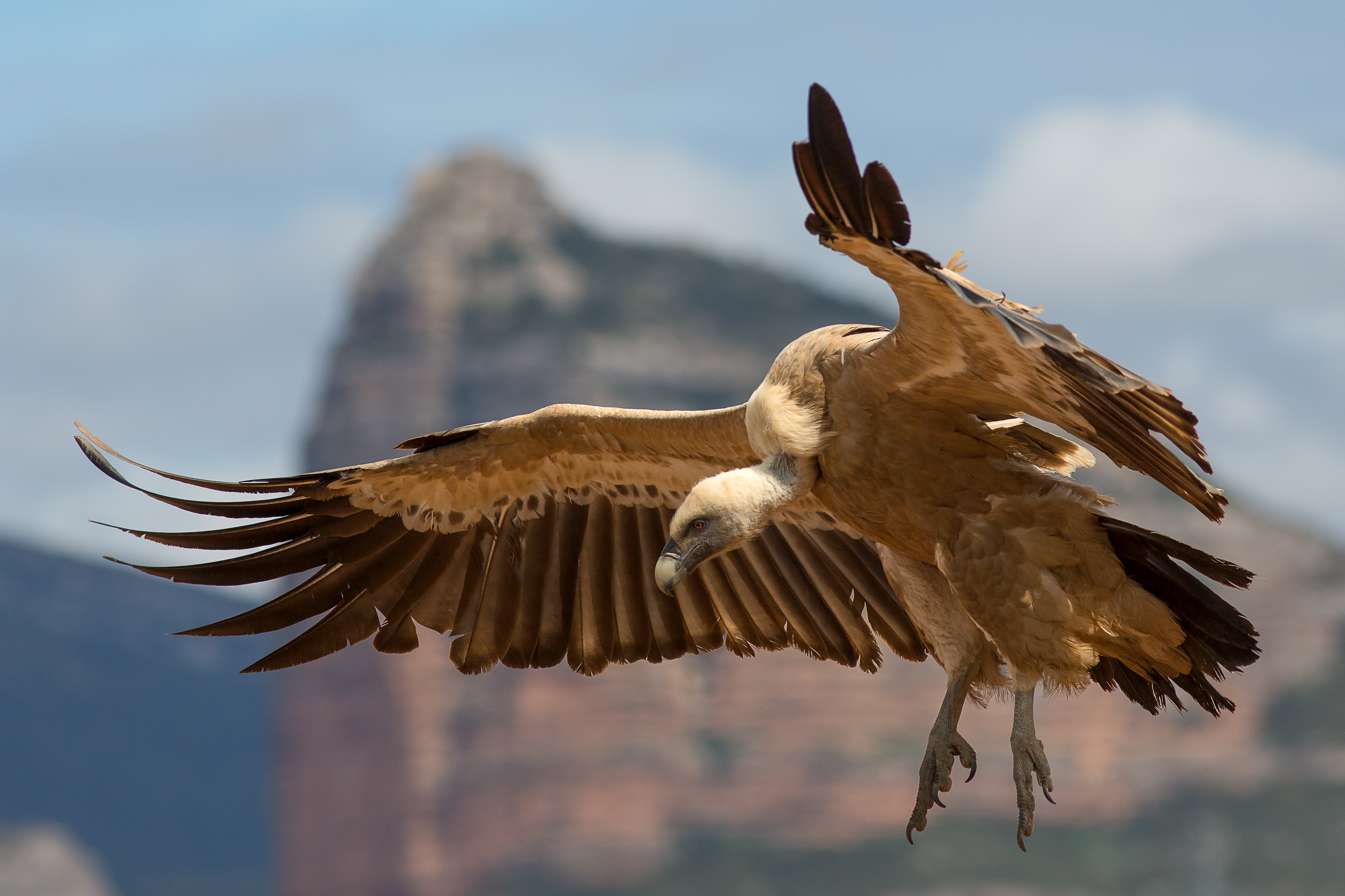
Griffon vulture, Spain

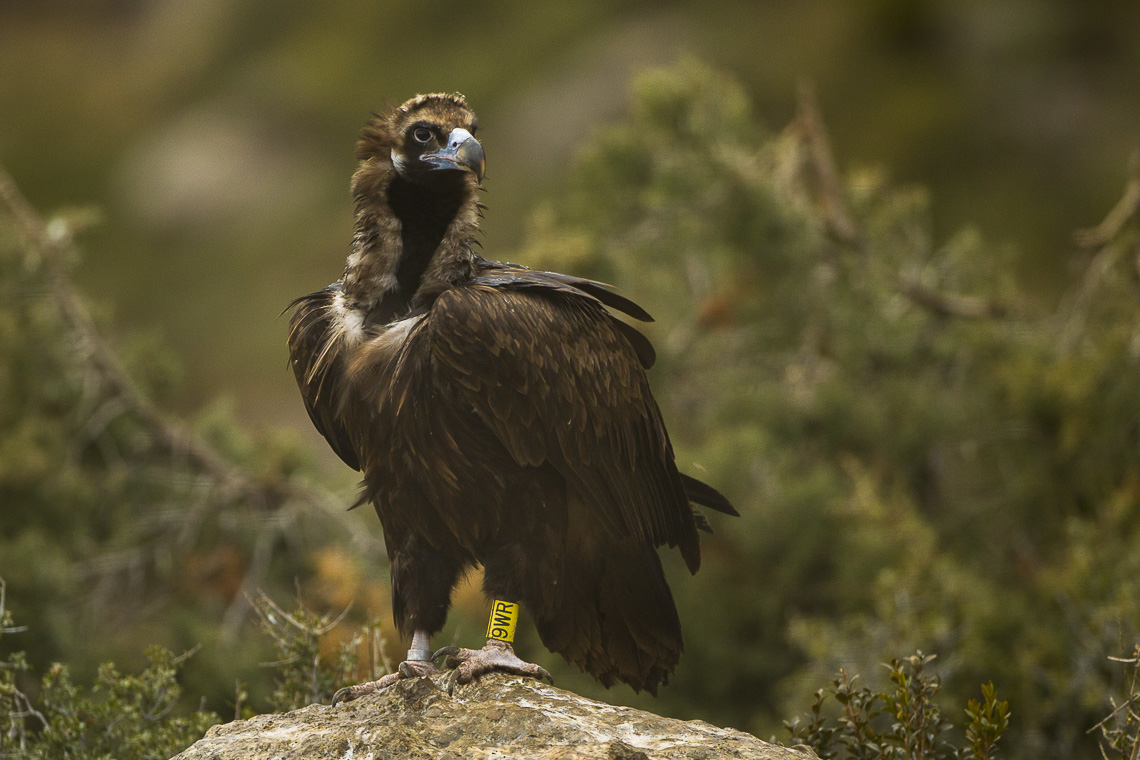
Black vulture, Pyrenees, Catalonia

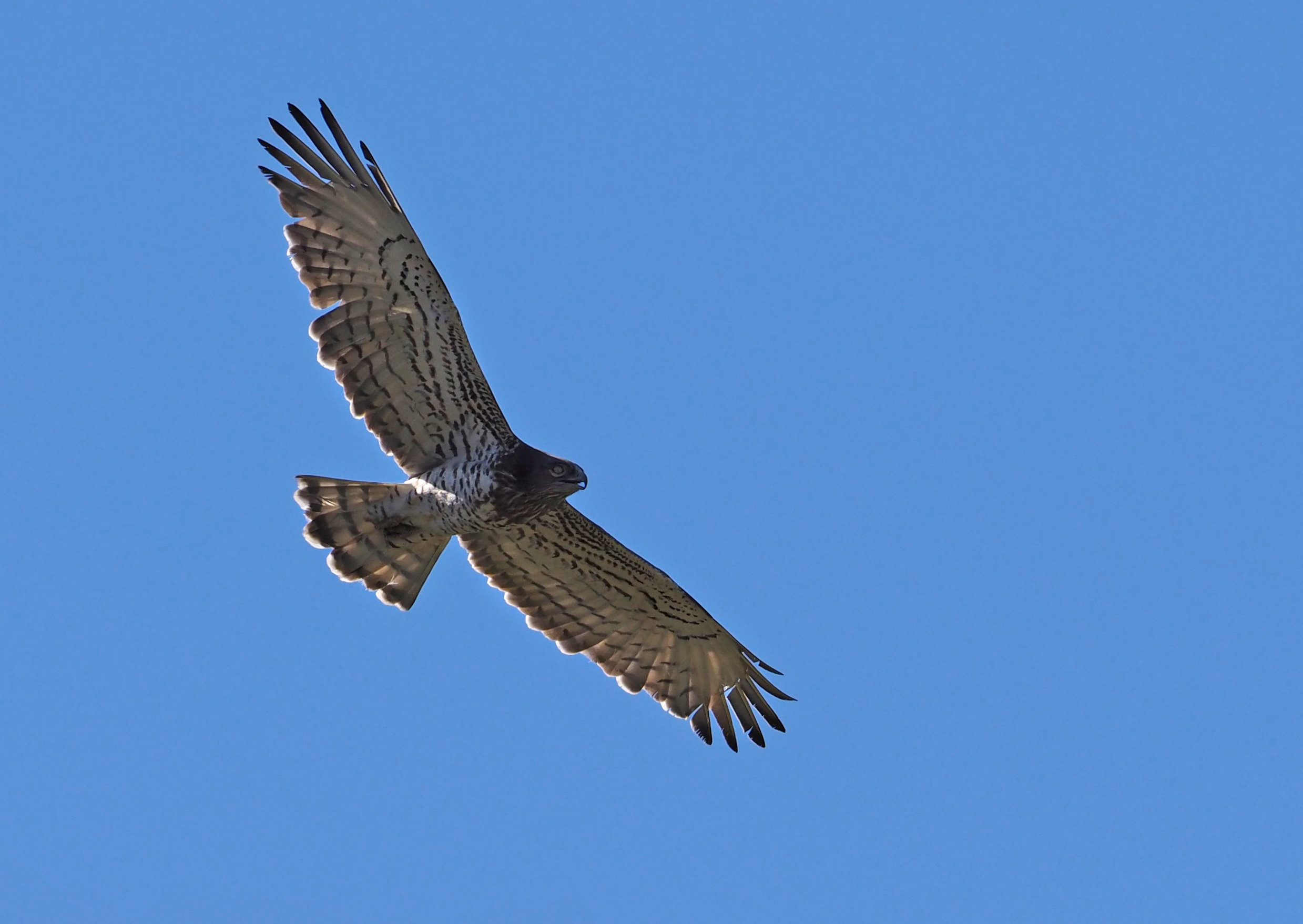
Short-toed snake eagle, Parque natural de la Sierra de Andújar

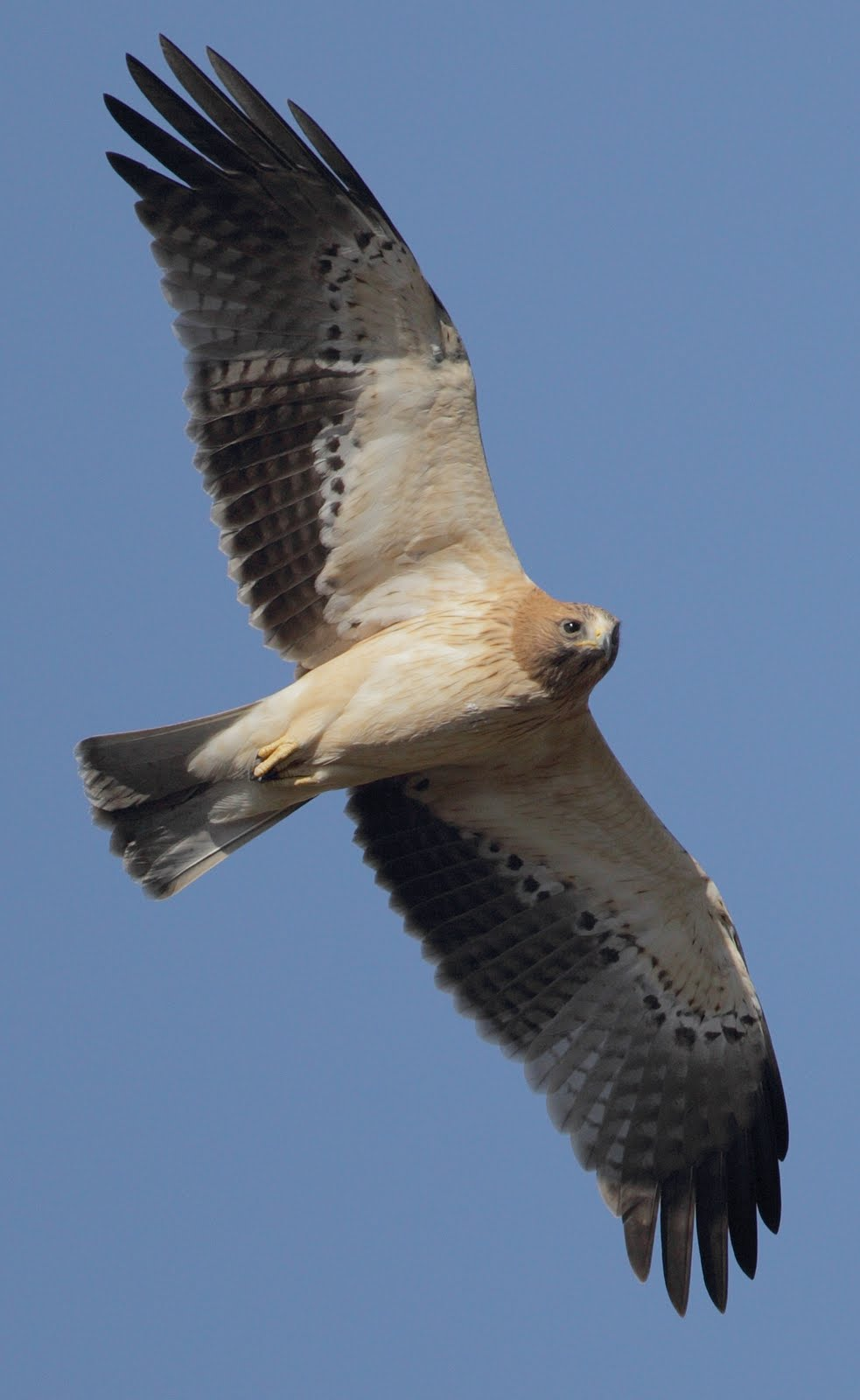
Booted eagle, La Cañada, Ávila

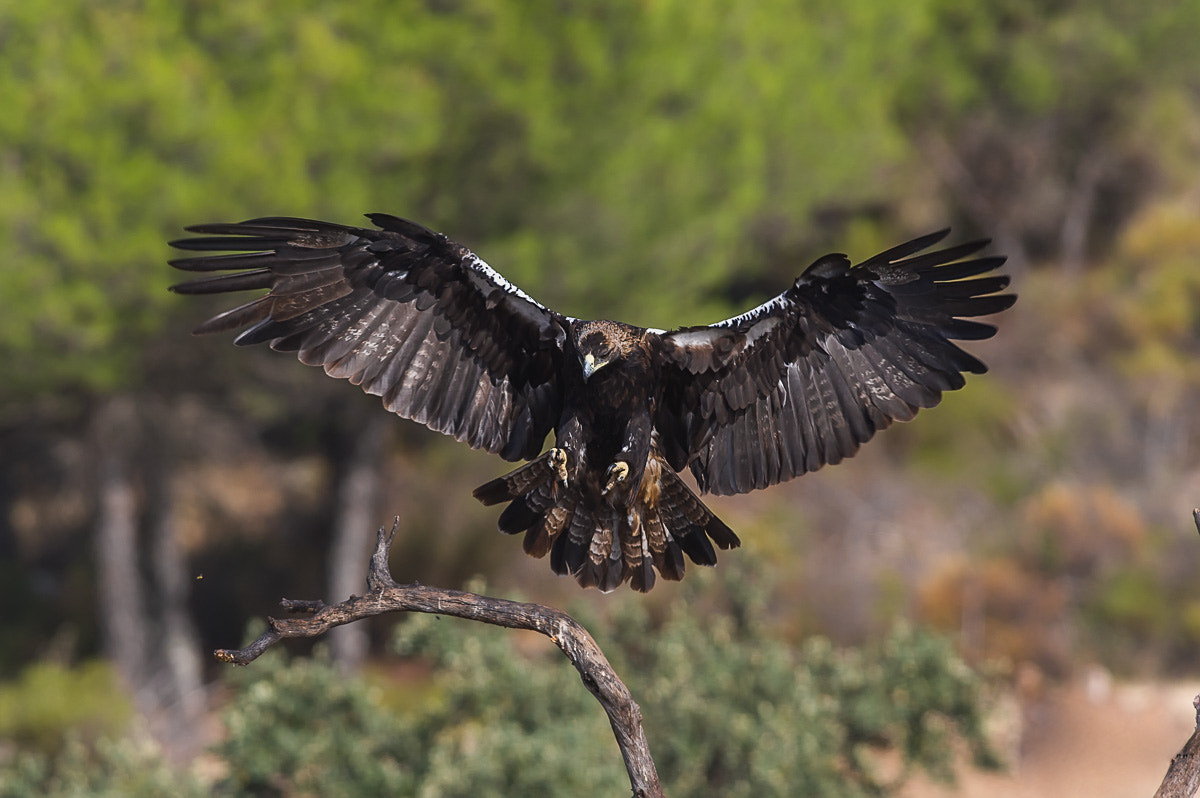
Spanish imperial eagle, Andalusia

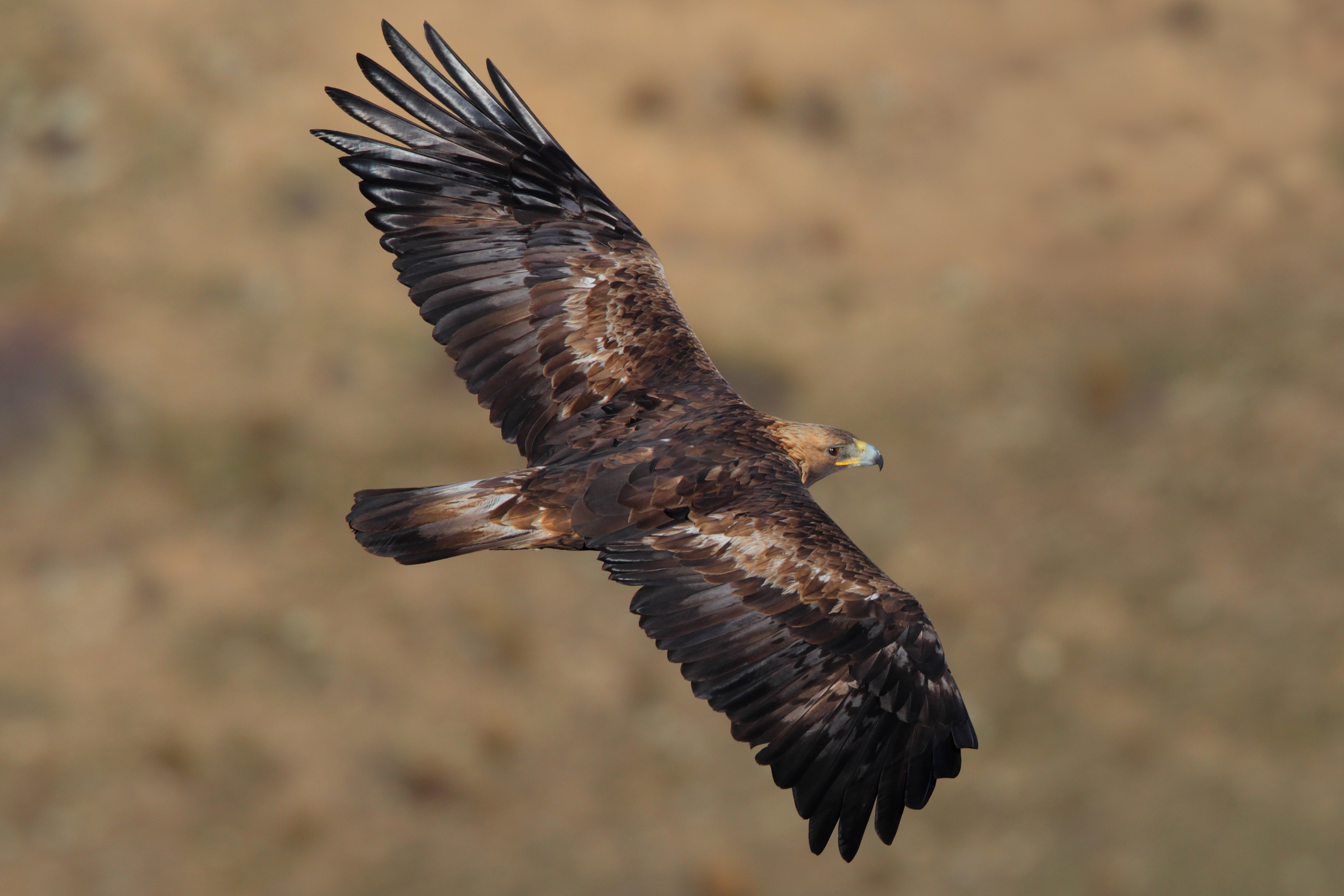
Golden eagle, La Cañada, Ávila

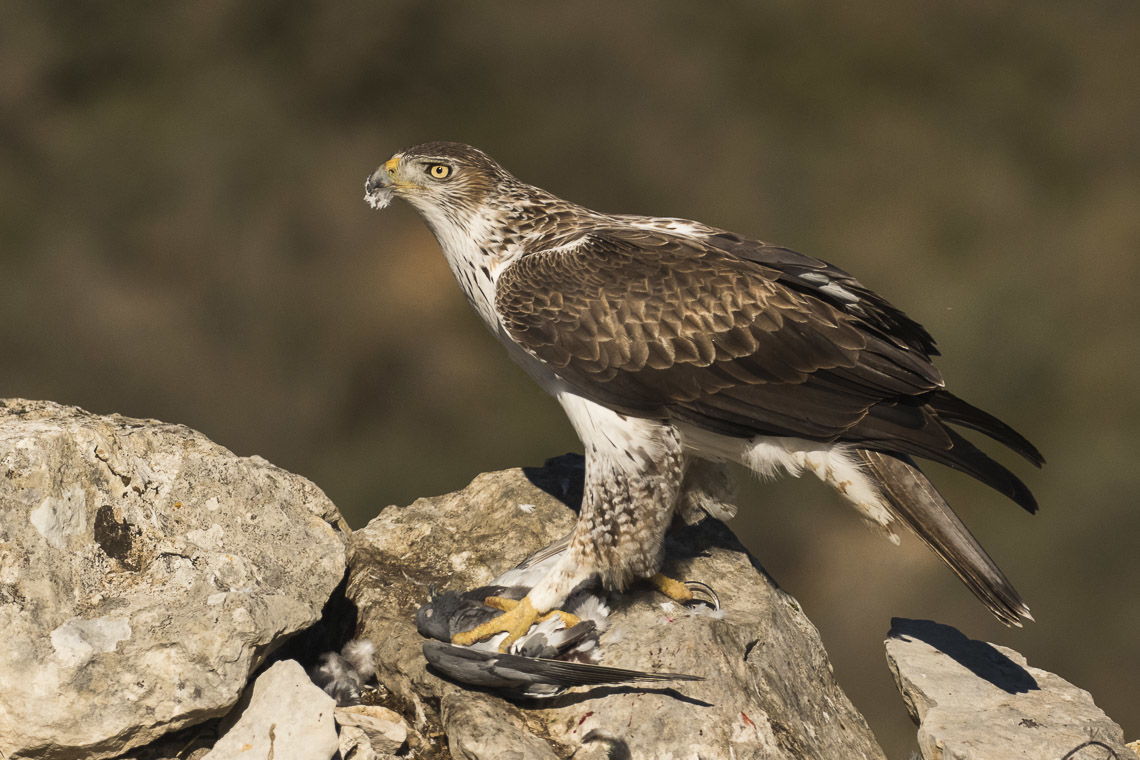
Bonelli's eagle, Montsonís, Lleida, Catalonia

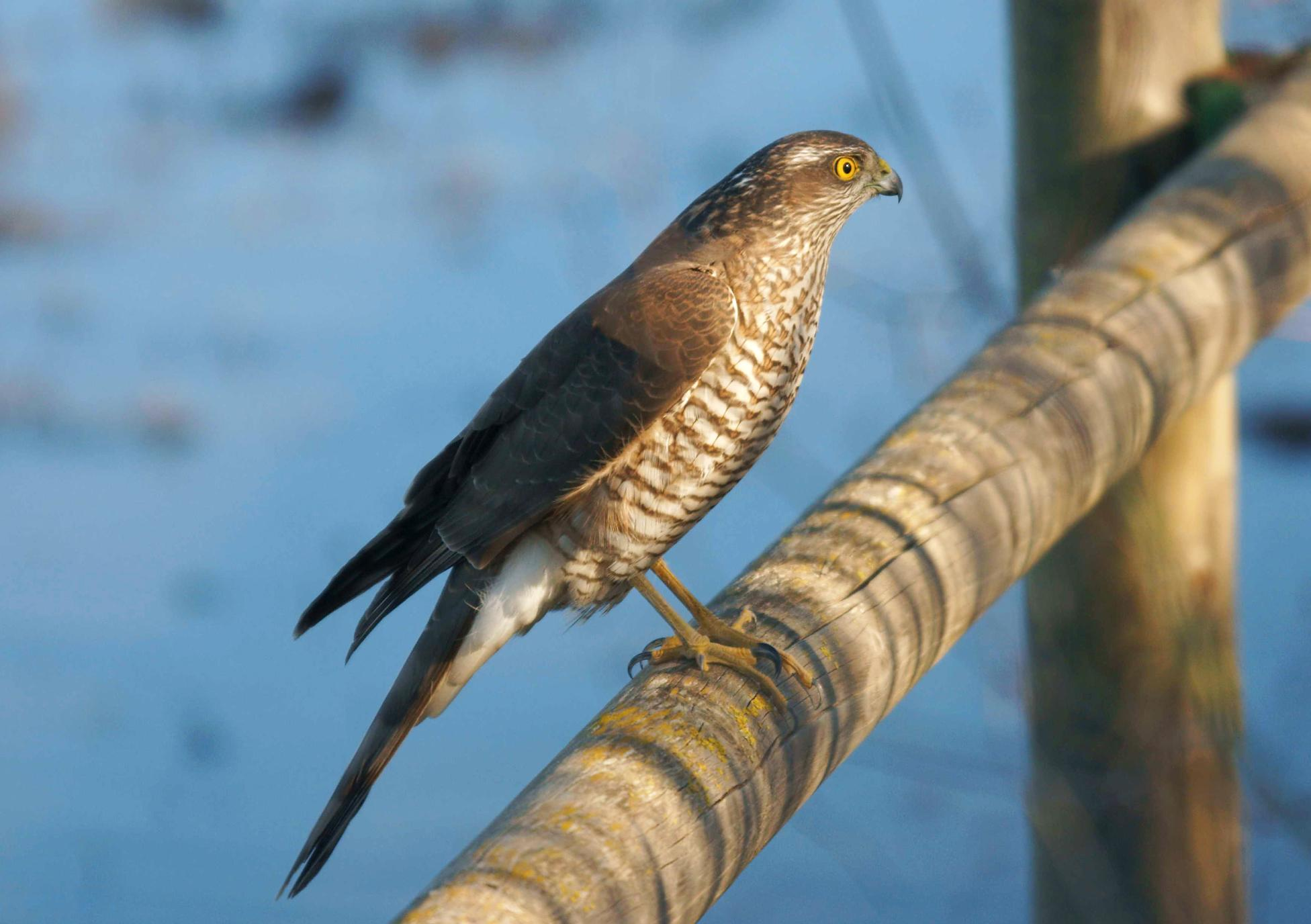
Eurasian sparrowhawk, Barcelona, Catalonia

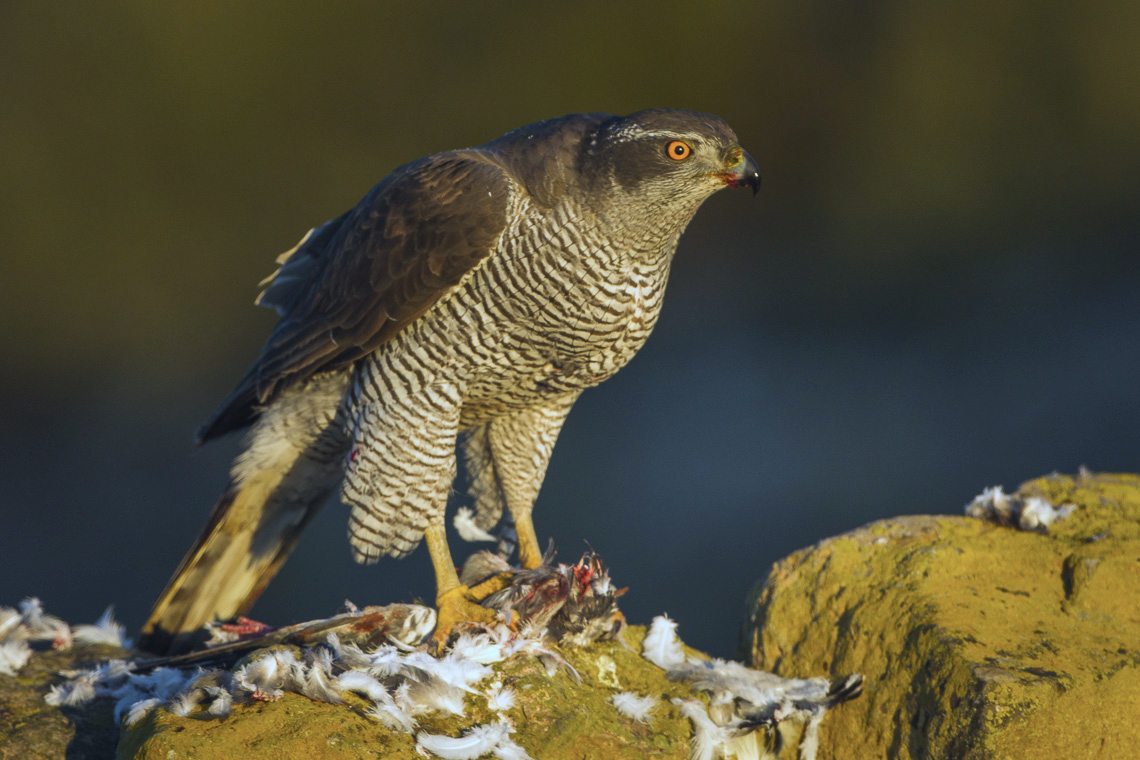
Eurasian goshawk, Catalonia

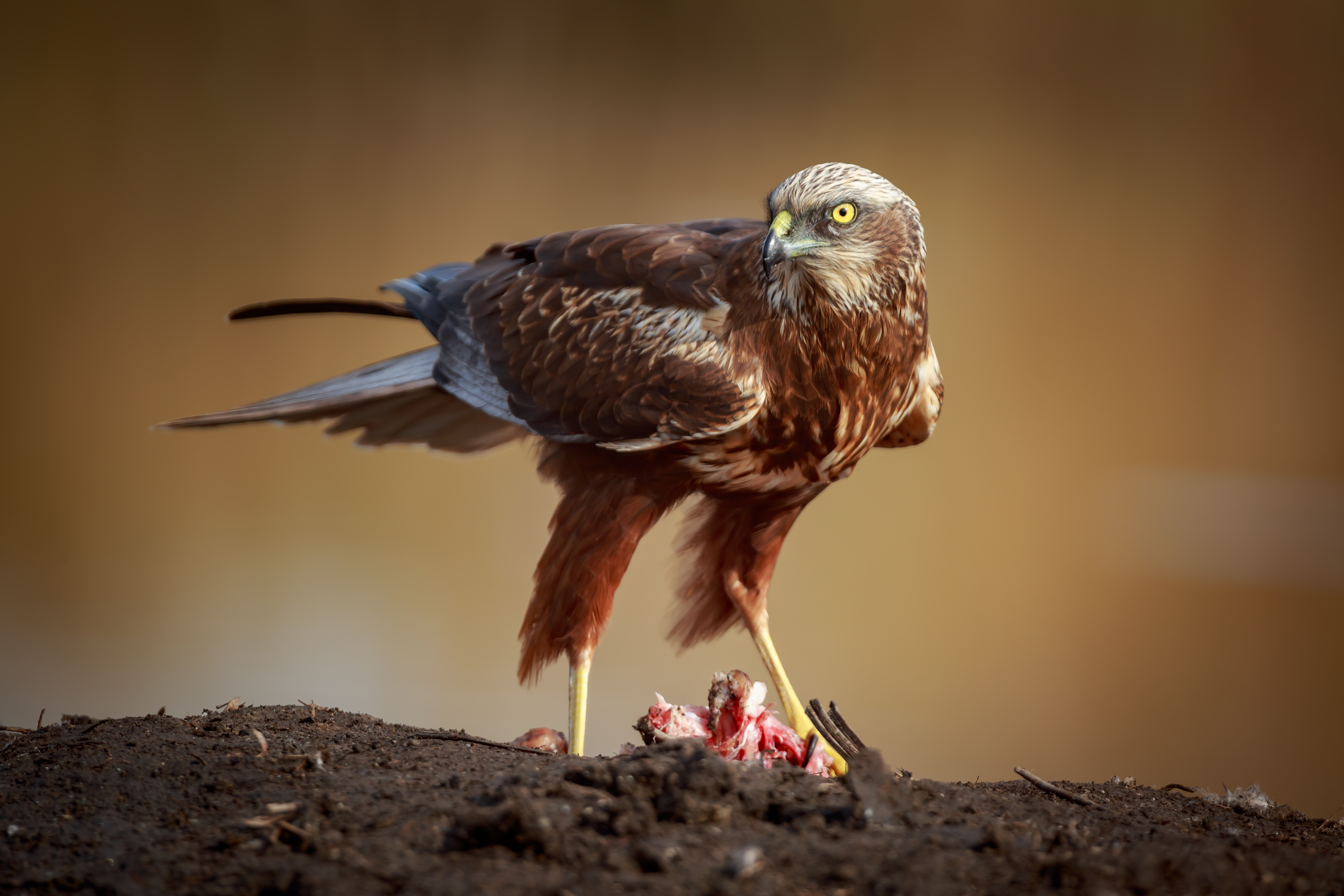
Western marsh harrier, Valencia

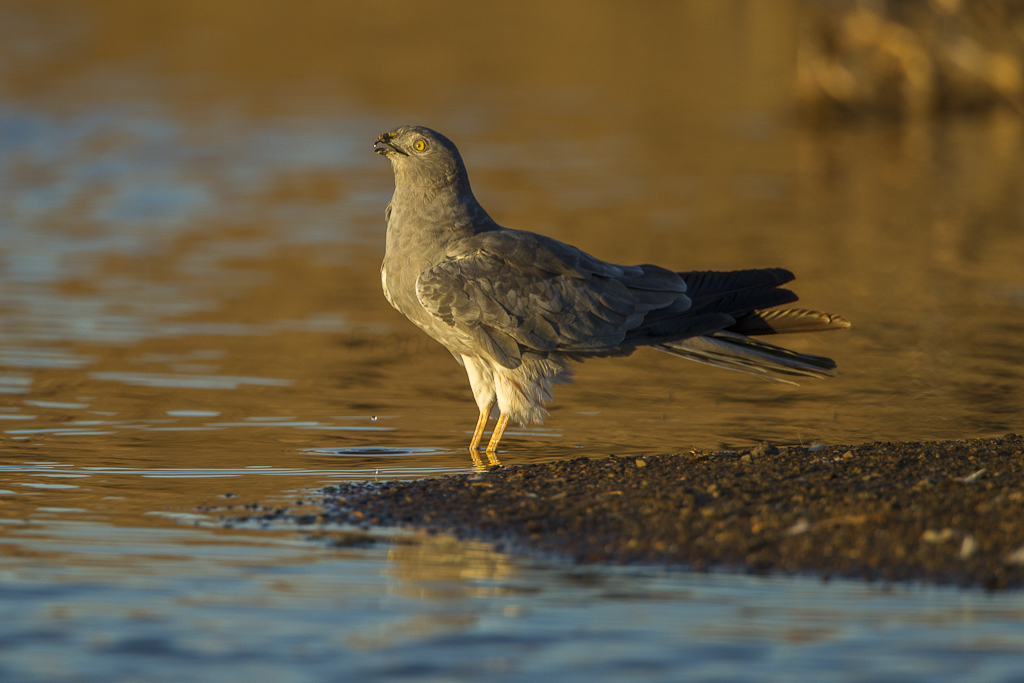
Montagu's harrier, Castuera, Extremadura

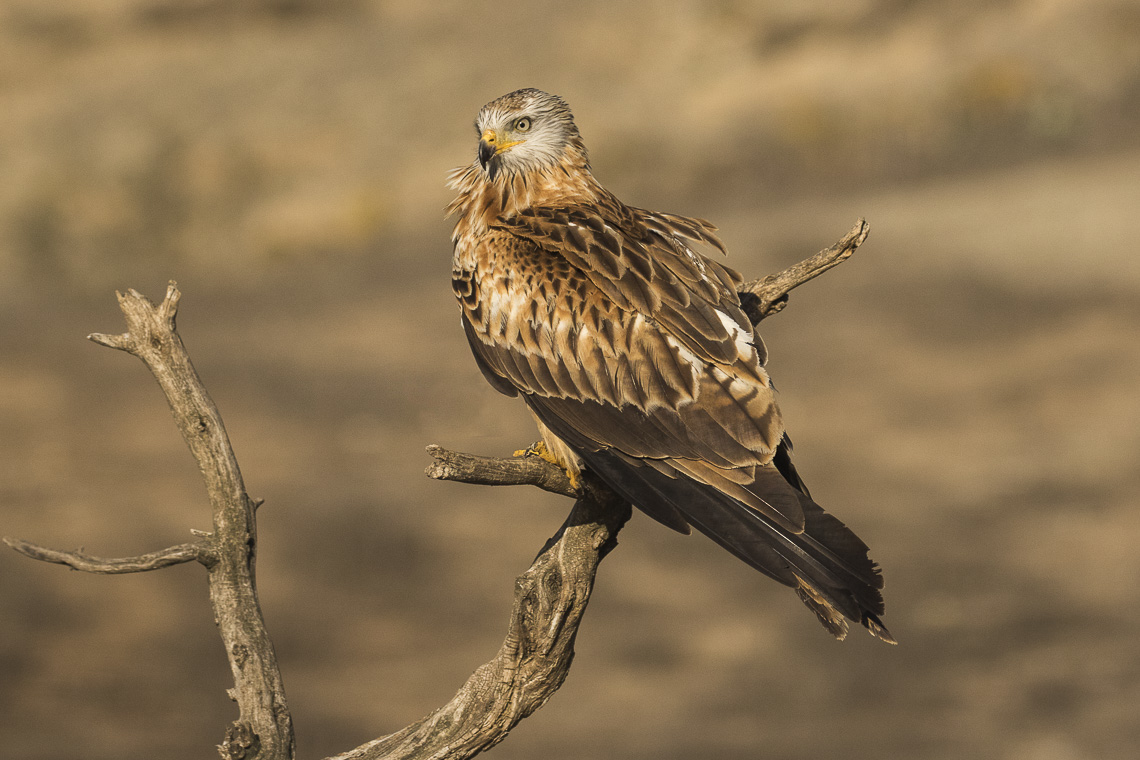
Red kite, Lleida, Catalonia

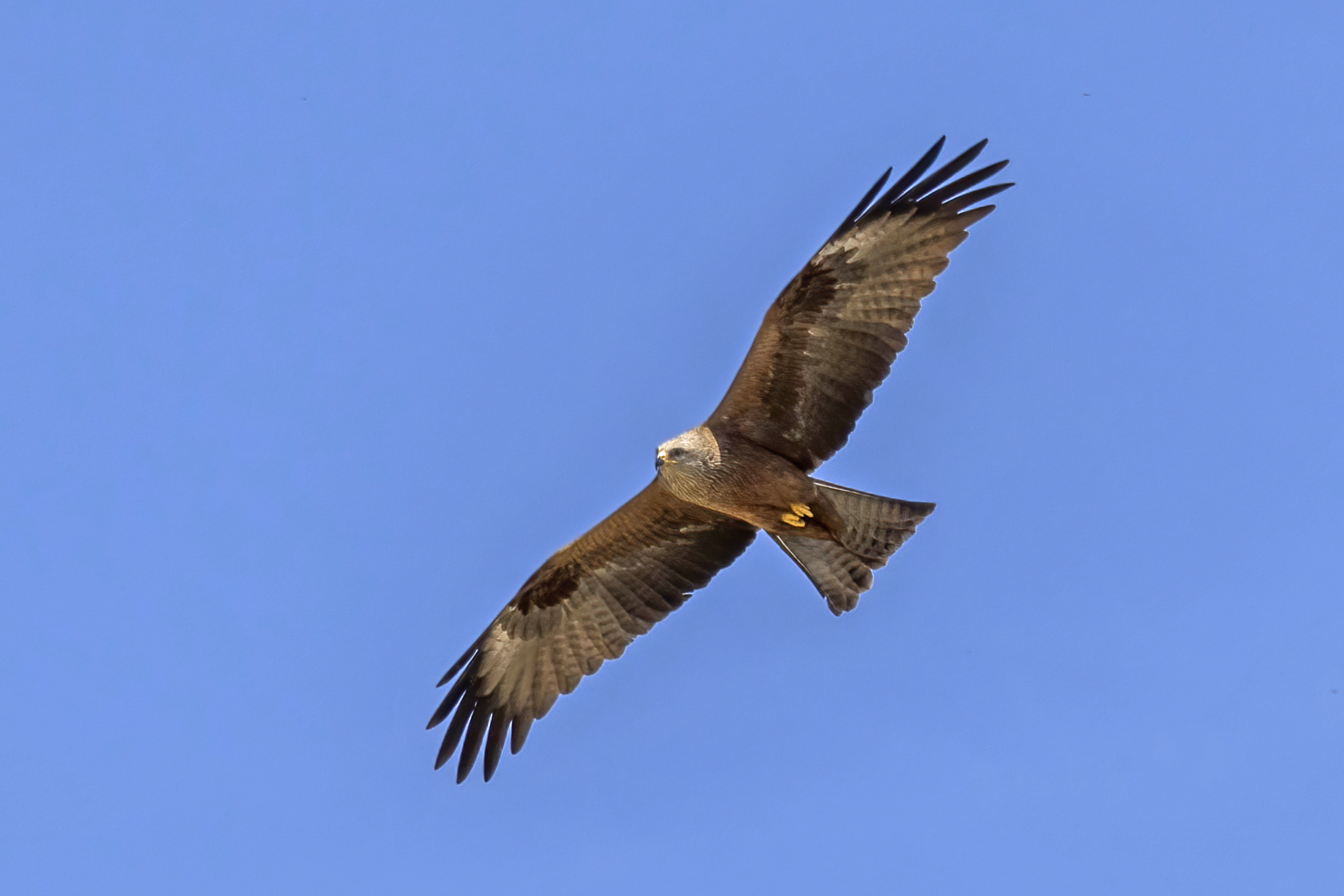
Black kite, Huelva, Andalusia

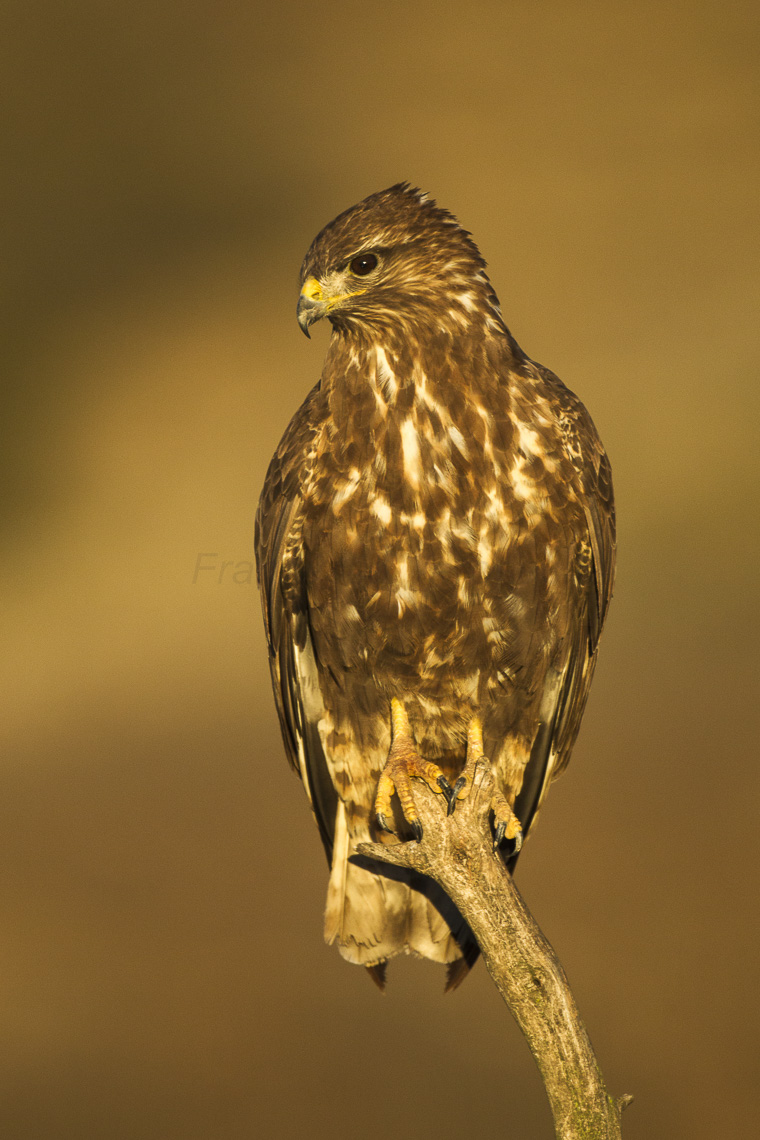
Common buzzard, Catalonia

== Barn owls ==
Order: Strigiformes Family: Tytonidae

Barn owls are medium to large owls with large heads and characteristic heart-shaped faces. They have long strong legs with powerful talons.

- Western barn owl, Tyto alba (lechuza común)
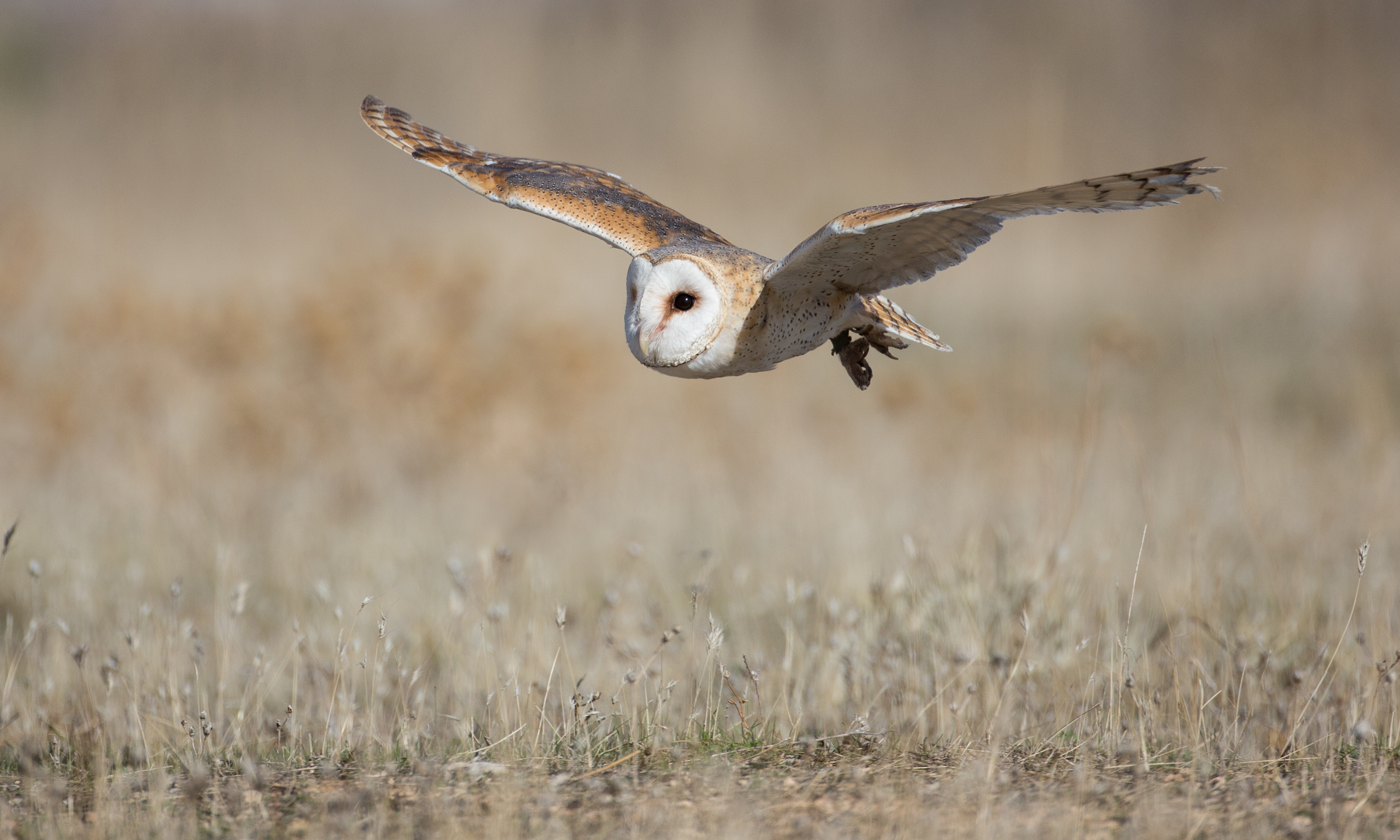
Western barn owl, Madrid

== Owls ==
Order: Strigiformes Family: Strigidae

The typical owls are small to large solitary nocturnal birds of prey. They have large forward-facing eyes and ears, a hawk-like beak and a conspicuous circle of feathers around each eye called a facial disk.

- Tengmalm's owl (mochuelo boreal), Aegolius funereus
- Little owl (mochuelo europeo), Athene noctua
- Northern hawk-owl (cárabo gavilán), Surnia ulula (B R)
- Eurasian pygmy owl (mochuelo alpino), Glaucidium passerinum (R)
- Eurasian scops owl (autillo europeo), Otus scops
- Long-eared owl (búho chico), Asio otus
- Short-eared owl (búho campestre), Asio flammeus
- Marsh owl (búho moro), Asio capensis (R)
- Snowy owl (búho nival), Bubo scandiacus (R)
- Eurasian eagle-owl (búho real), Bubo bubo
- Pharaoh eagle-owl (búho del desierto), Bubo ascalaphus (R)
- Tawny owl (cárabo común), Strix aluco
- Maghreb owl (cárabo del Magreb), Strix mauritanica
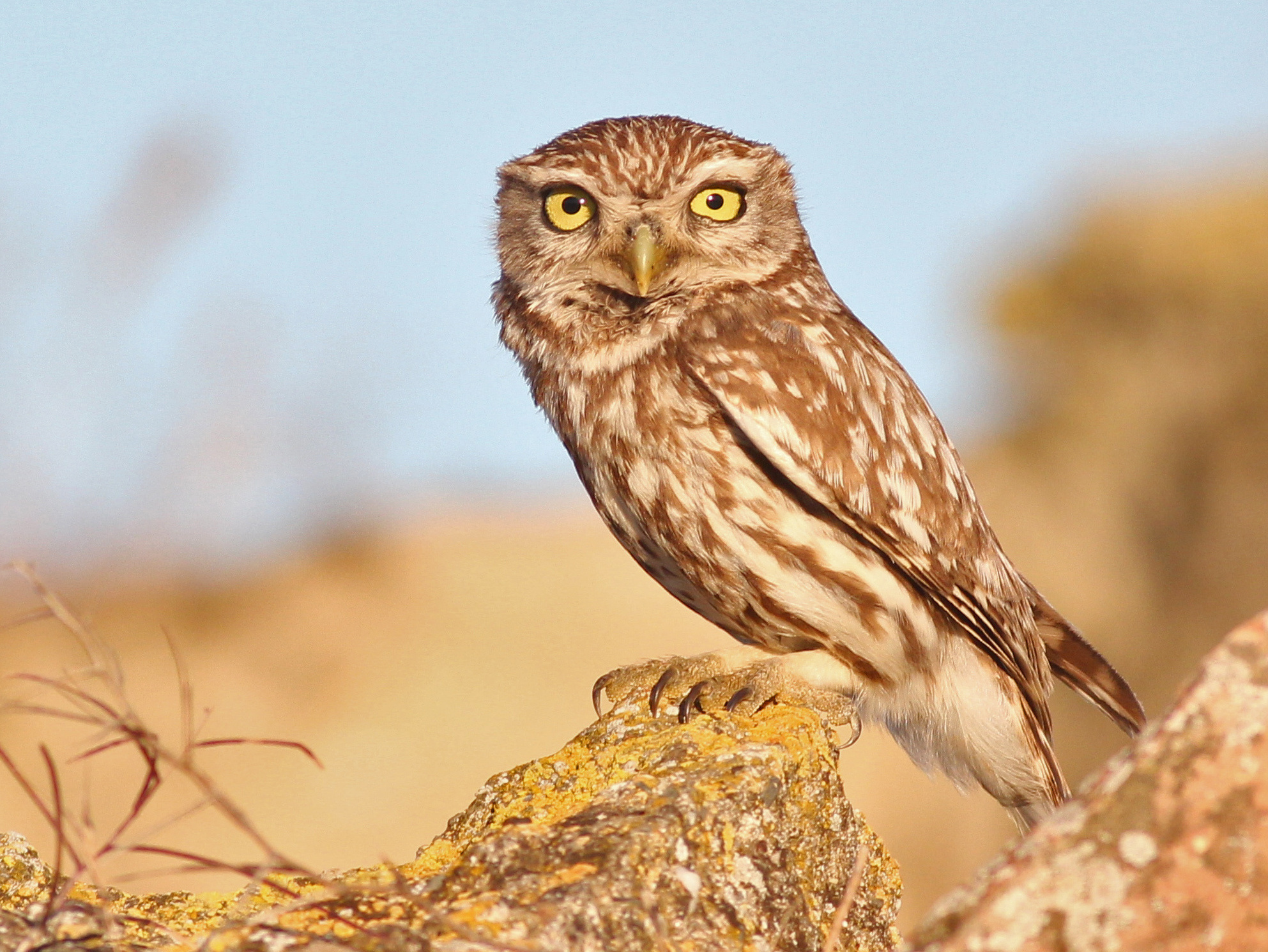
Little owl, Spain

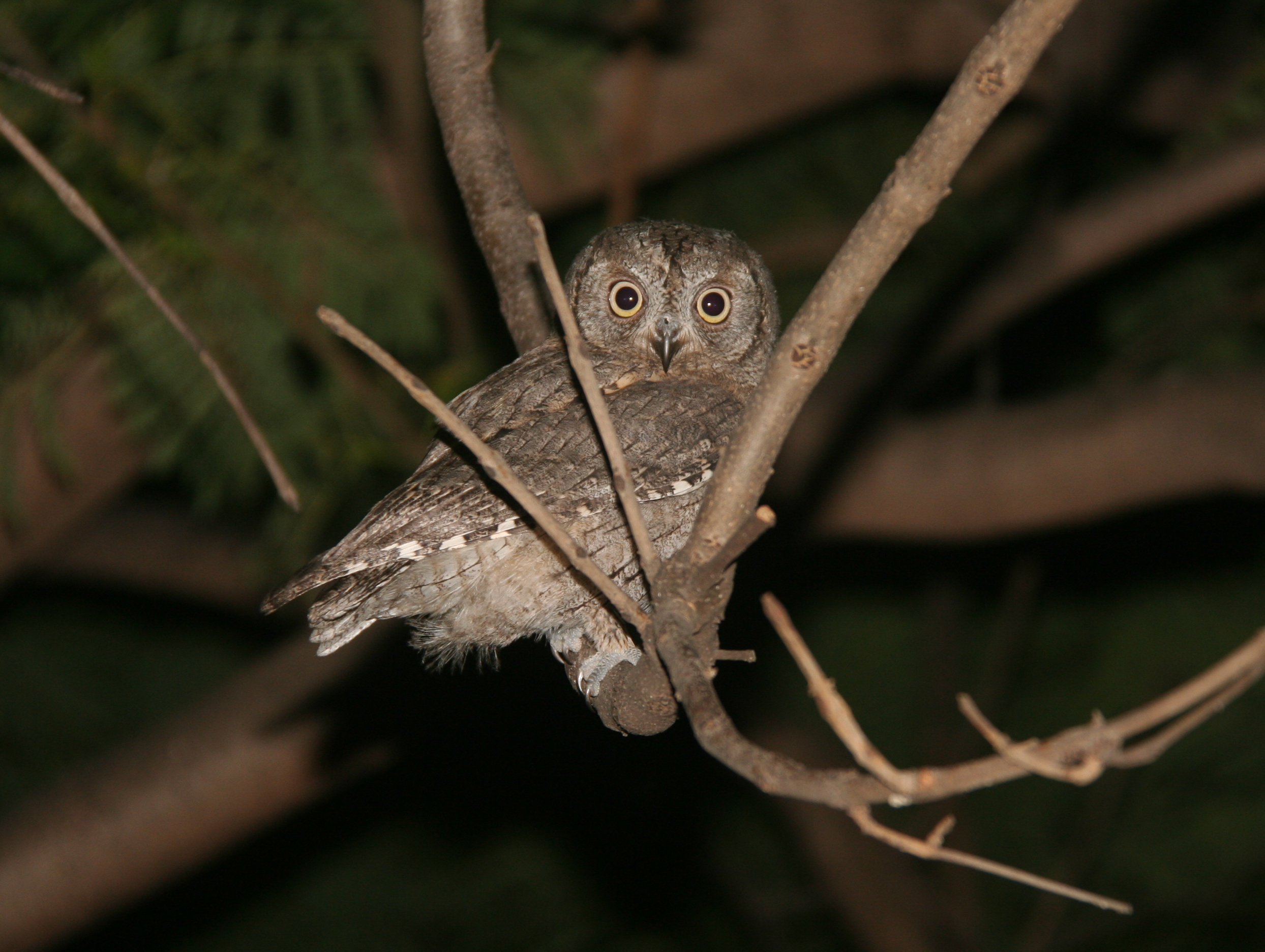
Scops owl, Seville

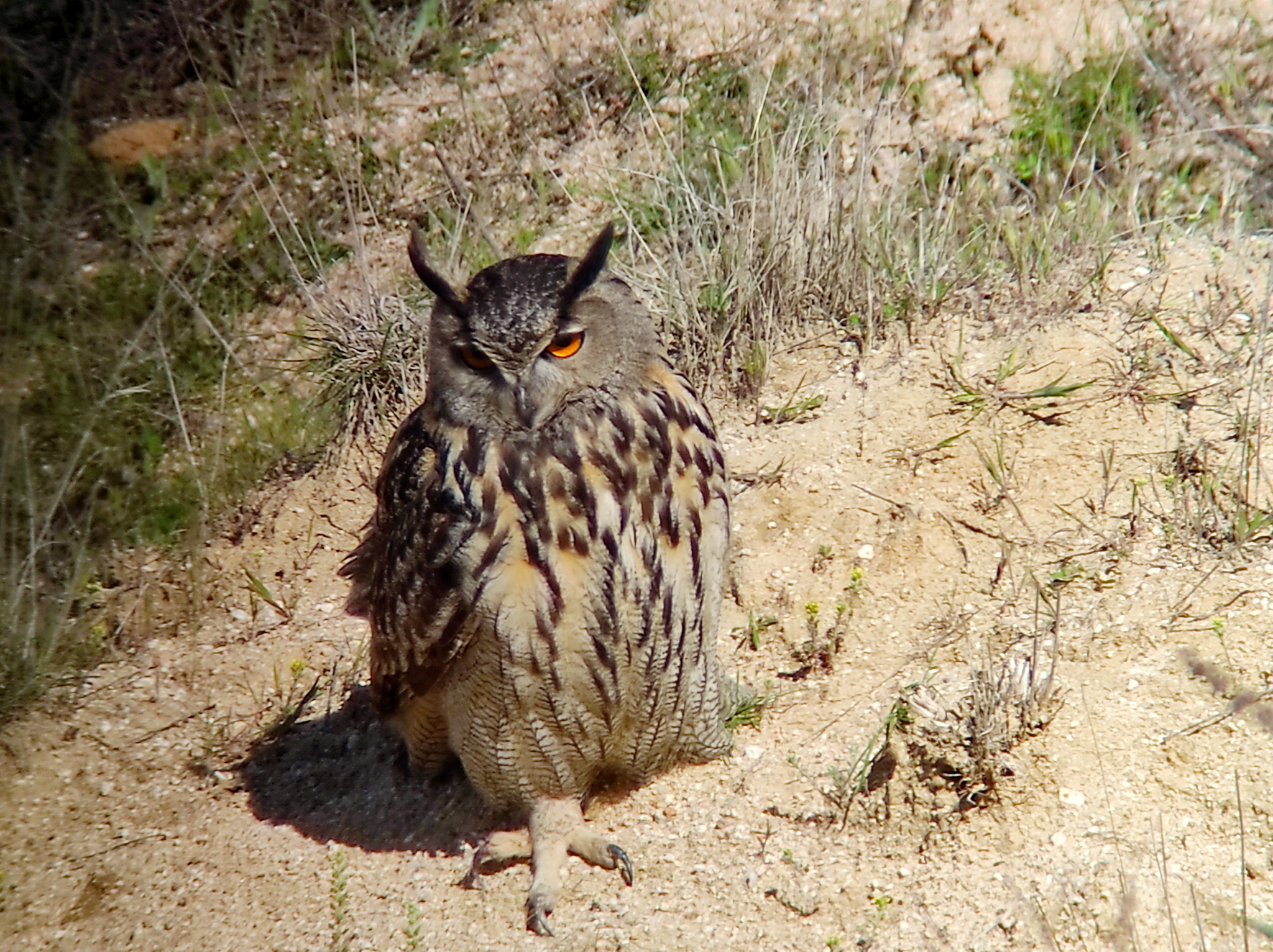
Eurasian eagle-owl, Madrid

== Hoopoes ==
Order: Bucerotiformes Family: Upupidae

Hoopoes have black, white and orangey-pink colour with a large erectile crest on their head.

- Eurasian hoopoe (abubilla común), Upupa epops
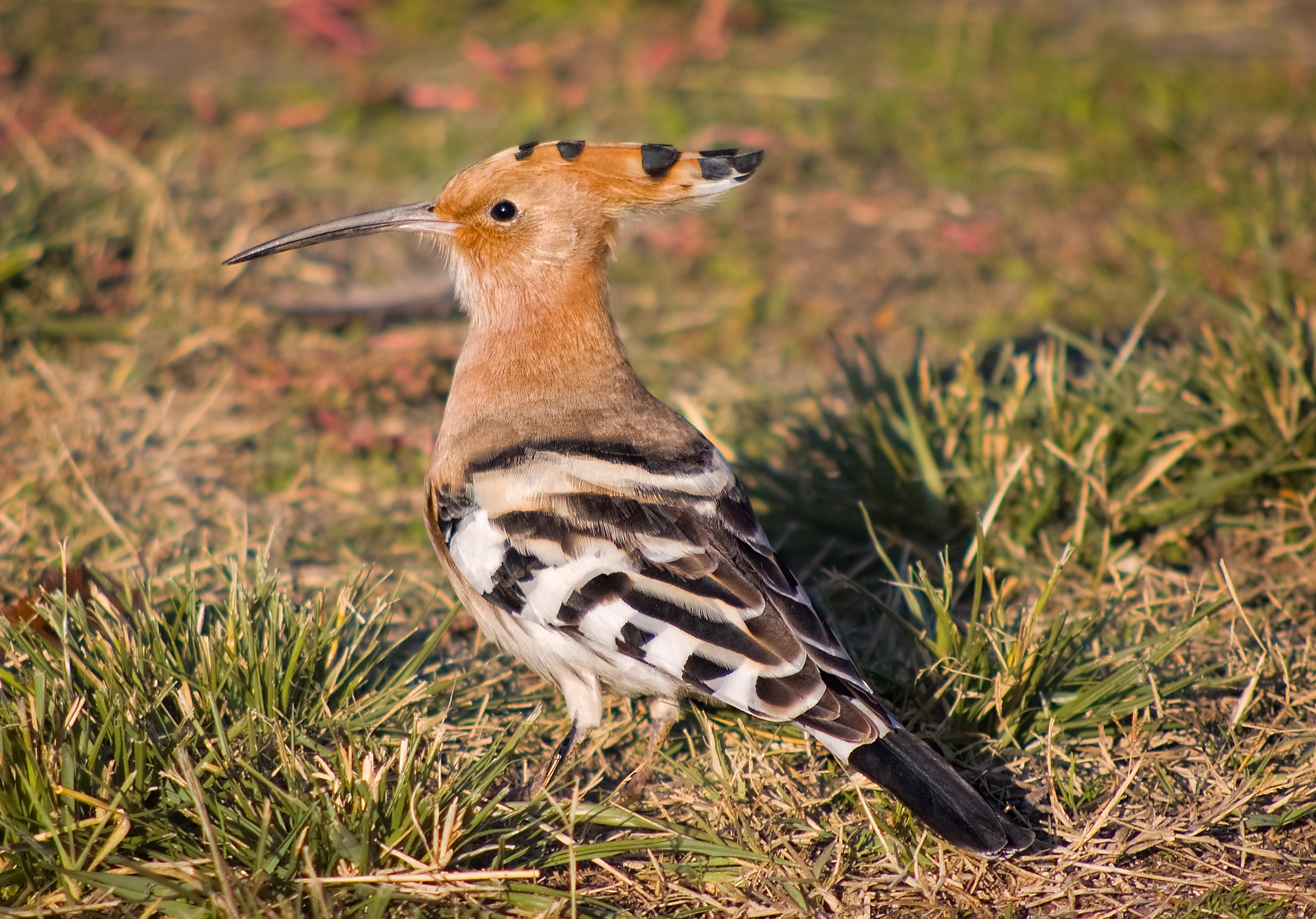
Eurasian hoopoe, Madrid

== Rollers ==
Order: Coraciiformes Family: Coraciidae

Rollers resemble crows in size and build, but are more closely related to the kingfishers and bee-eaters. They share the colourful appearance of those groups with blues and browns predominating. The two inner front toes are connected, but the outer toe is not.

- Abyssinian roller (carraca abisinia), Coracias abyssinicus (R)
- European roller (carraca europea), Coracias garrulus
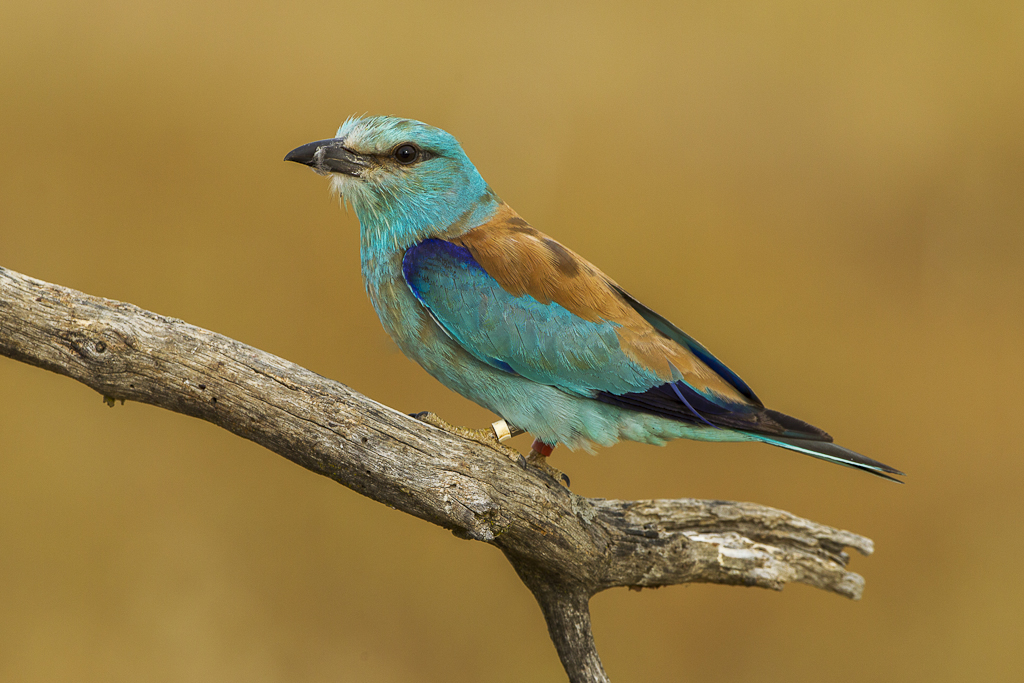
European roller, Extremadura

== Kingfishers ==
Order: Coraciiformes Family: Alcedinidae

Kingfishers are medium-sized birds with large heads, long, pointed bills, short legs and stubby tails.

- Common kingfisher (martín pescador común), Alcedo atthis
- Belted kingfisher (martín gigante norteamericano), Megaceryle alcyon (R)
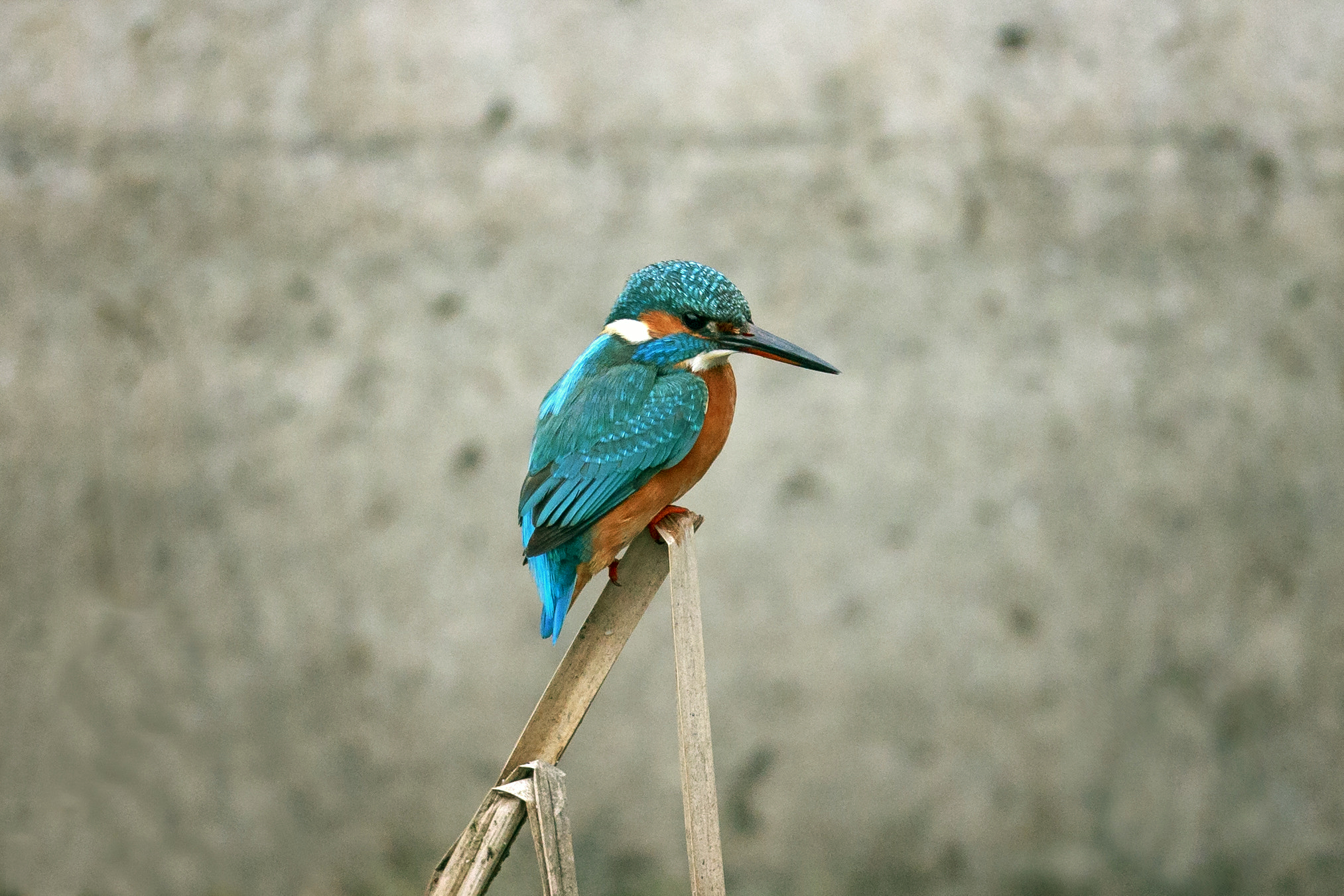
Common kingfisher, Andalusia

== Bee-eaters ==
Order: Coraciiformes Family: Meropidae

The bee-eaters are a group of coraciiform birds in the family Meropidae. Most species are found in Africa but others occur in southern Europe, Madagascar, Australia and New Guinea. They are characterised by richly coloured plumage, slender bodies and usually elongated central tail feathers. All are colourful and have long downturned bills and pointed wings, which give them a swallow-like appearance when seen from afar.

- Blue-cheeked bee-eater (abejaruco persa), Merops persicus (R)
- European bee-eater (abejaruco europeo), Merops apiaster
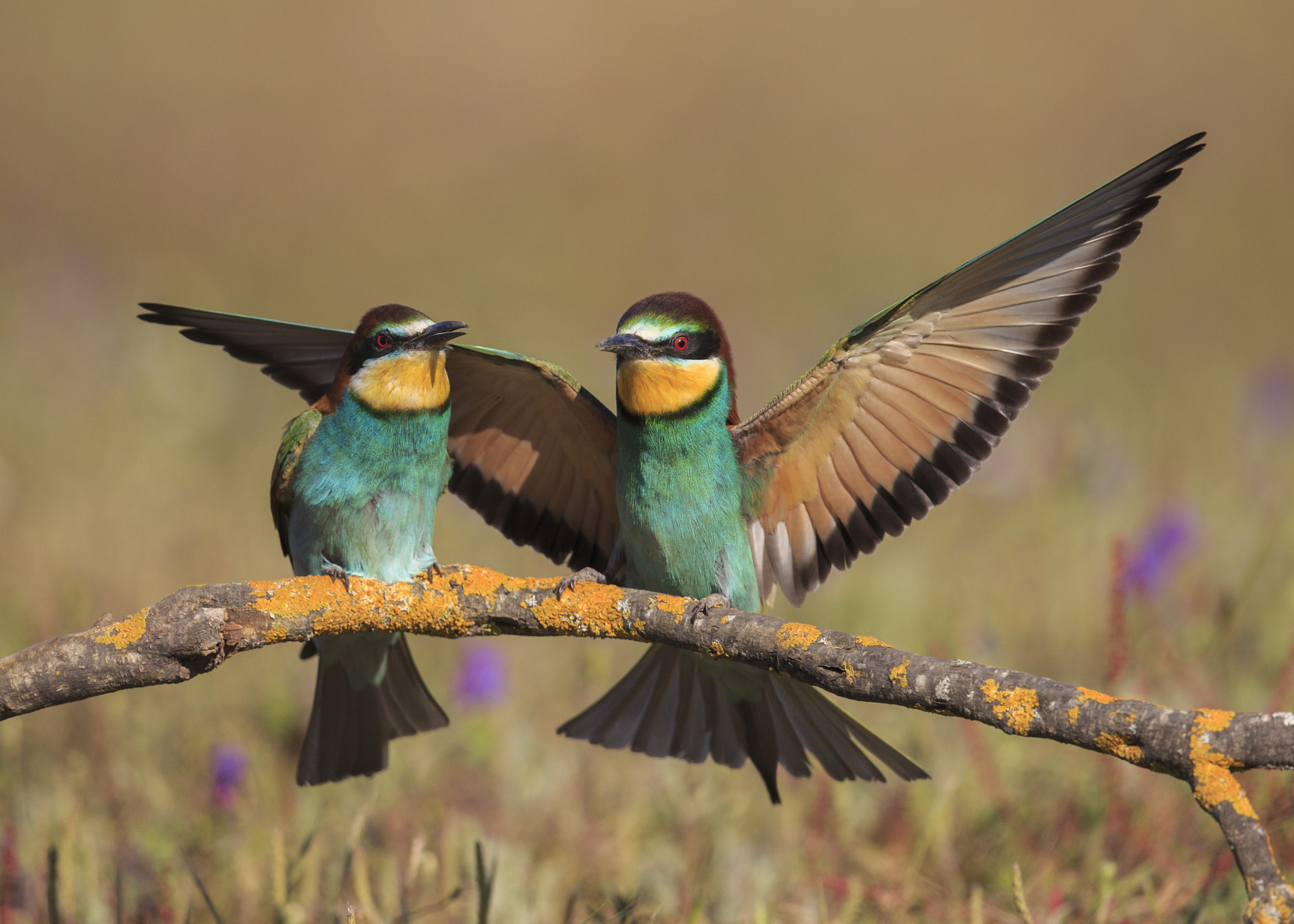
European bee-eaters, Andalusia

== Woodpeckers ==
Order: Piciformes Family: Picidae

Woodpeckers are small to medium-sized birds with chisel-like beaks, short legs, stiff tails and long tongues used for capturing insects. Most species have feet with two toes pointing forward and two backward, while a few species have only three toes. Many woodpeckers have the habit of tapping noisily on tree trunks with their beaks.

- Eurasian wryneck (torcecuello euroasiático), Jynx torquilla
- Middle spotted woodpecker (pico mediano), Dendrocoptes medius
- Lesser spotted woodpecker (pico menor), Dryobates minor
- Great spotted woodpecker (pico picapinos), Dendrocopos major
- White-backed woodpecker (pico dorsiblanco), Dendrocopos leucotos
- Black woodpecker (picamaderos negro), Dryocopus martius
- Iberian green woodpecker (pito real ibérico), Picus sharpei
- Levaillant's woodpecker (pito real bereber), Picus vaillantii (North African enclaves only)
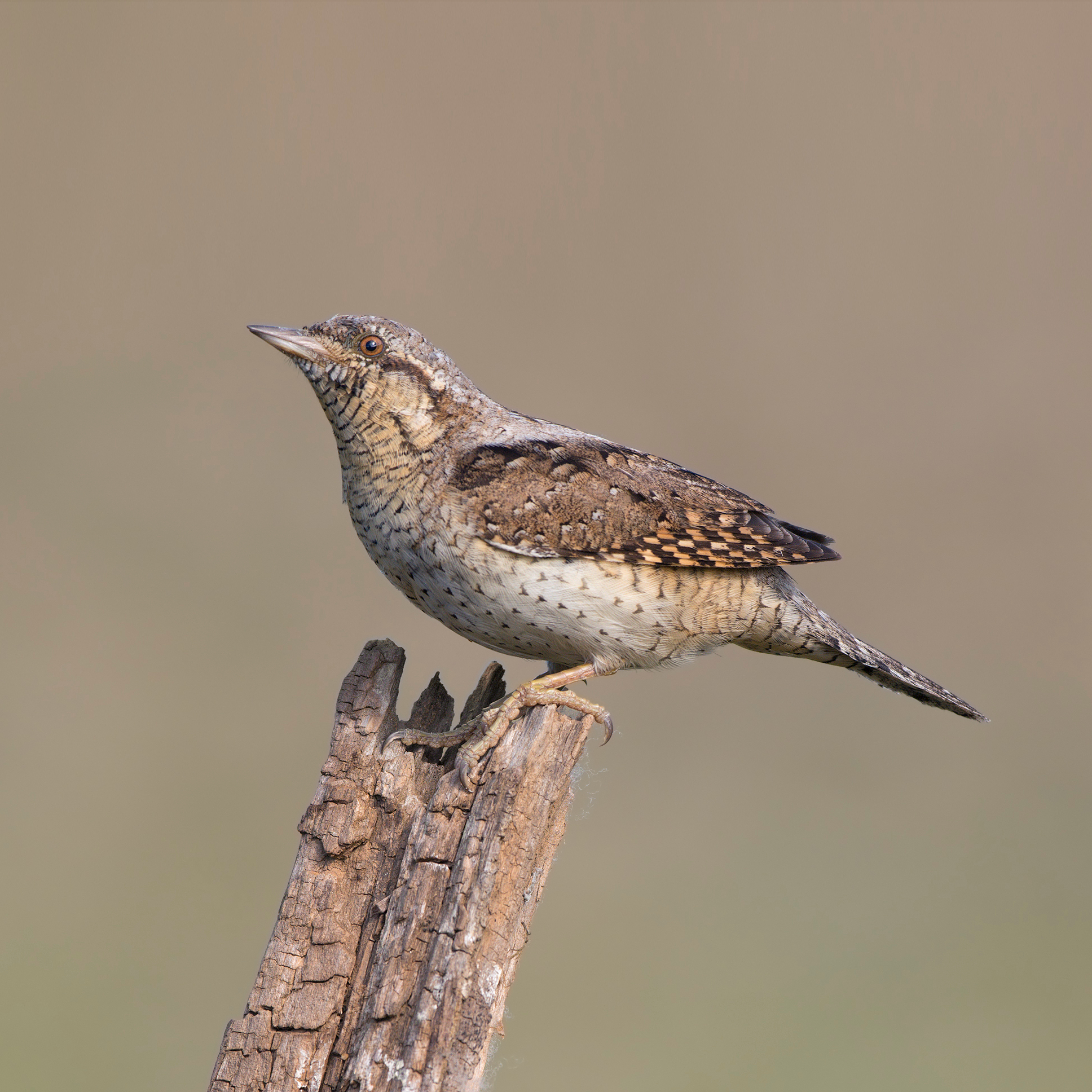
Eurasian wryneck, Córdoba

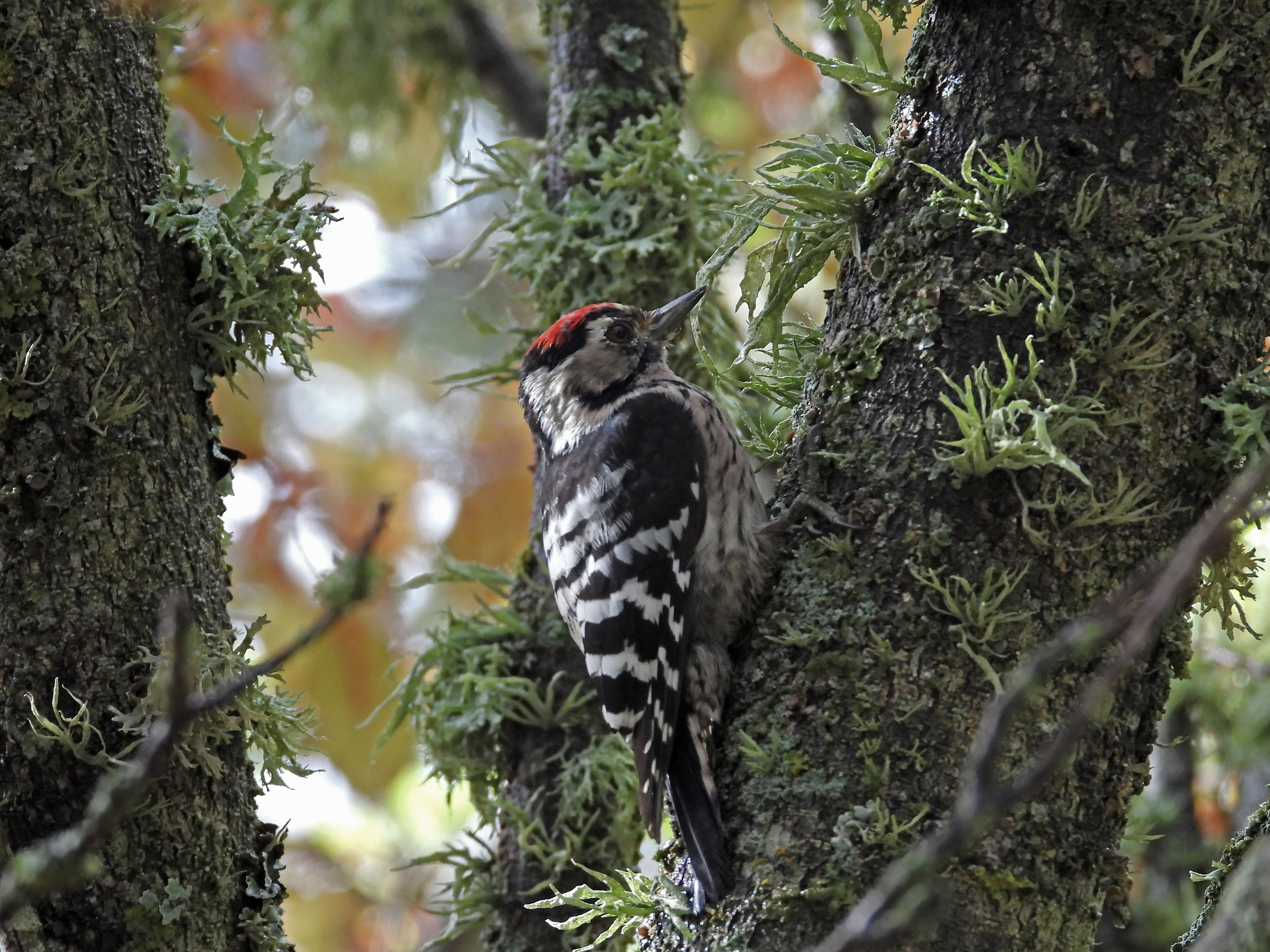
Lesser spotted woodpecker, Ávila

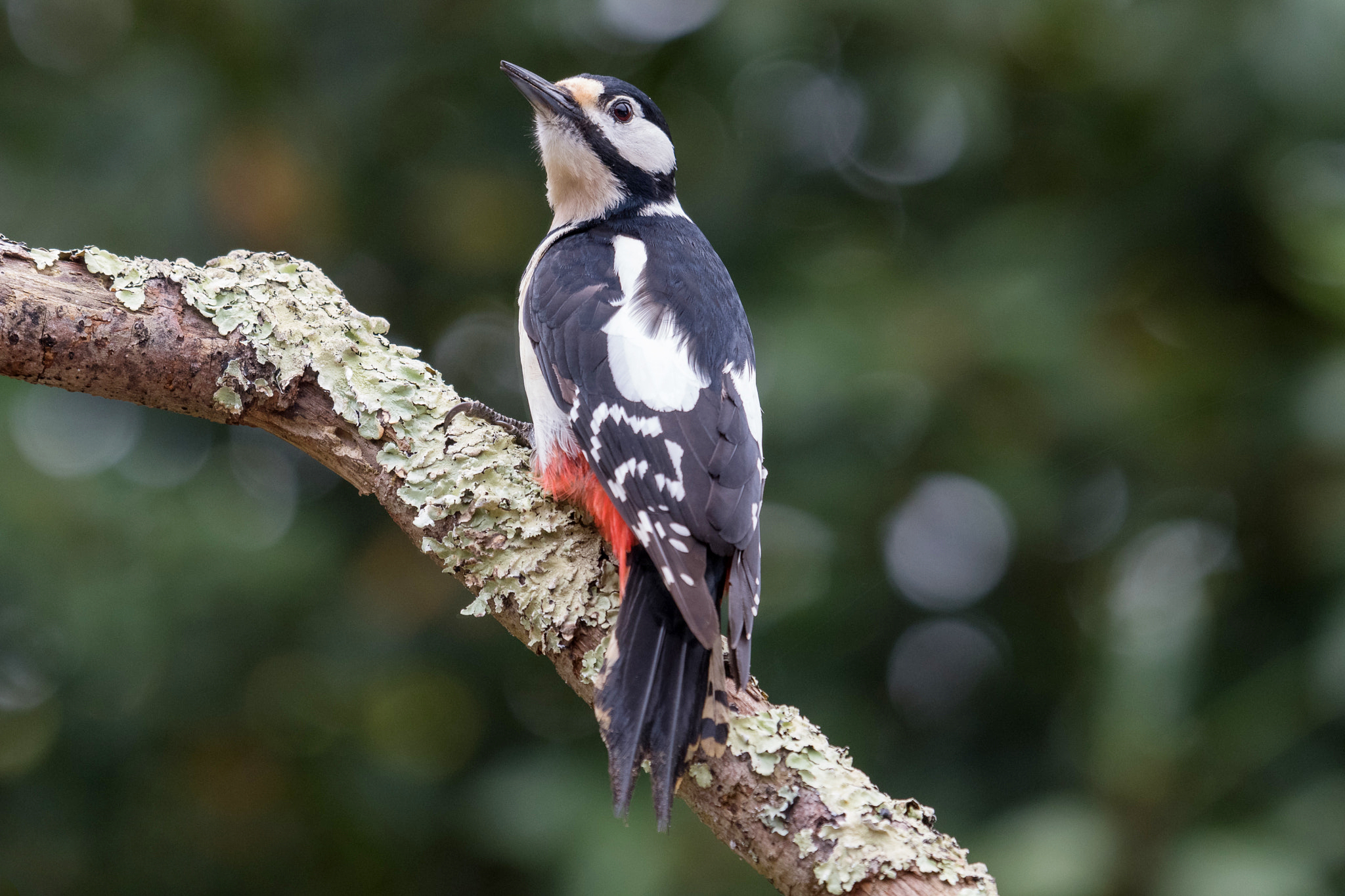
Great spotted woodpecker, Villaviciosa

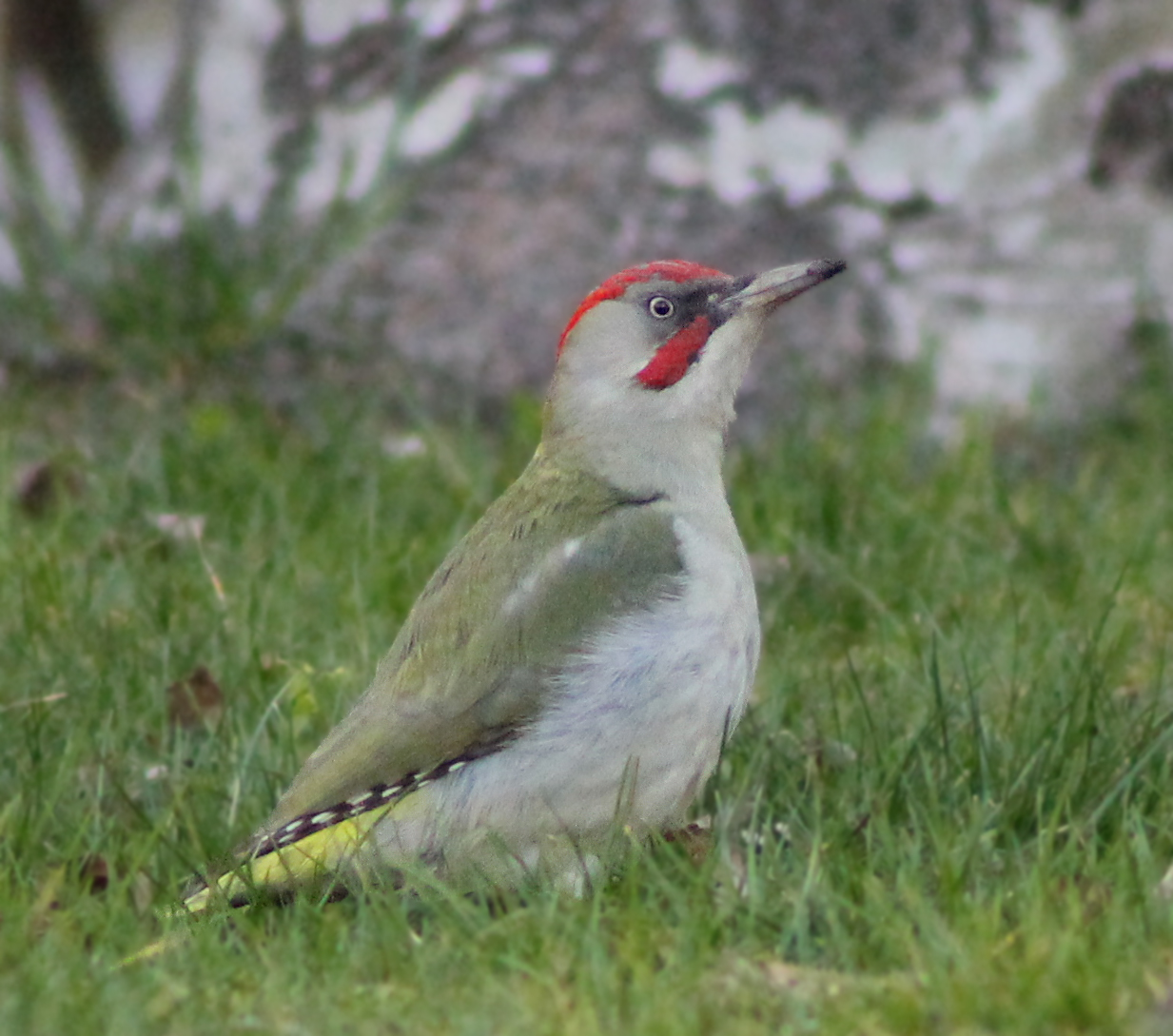
Iberian green woodpecker, Madrid

== Falcons and caracaras ==
Order: Falconiformes Family: Falconidae

Falconidae is a family of diurnal birds of prey. They differ from hawks, eagles and kites in their bills having a tomial 'tooth'.

- Lesser kestrel (cernícalo primilla), Falco naumanni
- Common kestrel (cernícalo vulgar), Falco tinnunculus
- Red-footed falcon (cernícalo patirrojo), Falco vespertinus
- Amur falcon (cernícalo del Amur), Falco amurensis (R)
- Eleonora's falcon (halcón de Eleonora), Falco eleonorae
- Merlin (Esmerejón), Falco columbarius
- Eurasian hobby (alcotán europeo), Falco subbuteo
- Lanner falcon (halcón borní), Falco biarmicus (R except for North African enclaves)
- Saker falcon (halcón sacre), Falco cherrug (R)
- Gyrfalcon (halcón gerifalte), Falco rusticolus (R)
- Peregrine falcon (halcón peregrino), Falco peregrinus
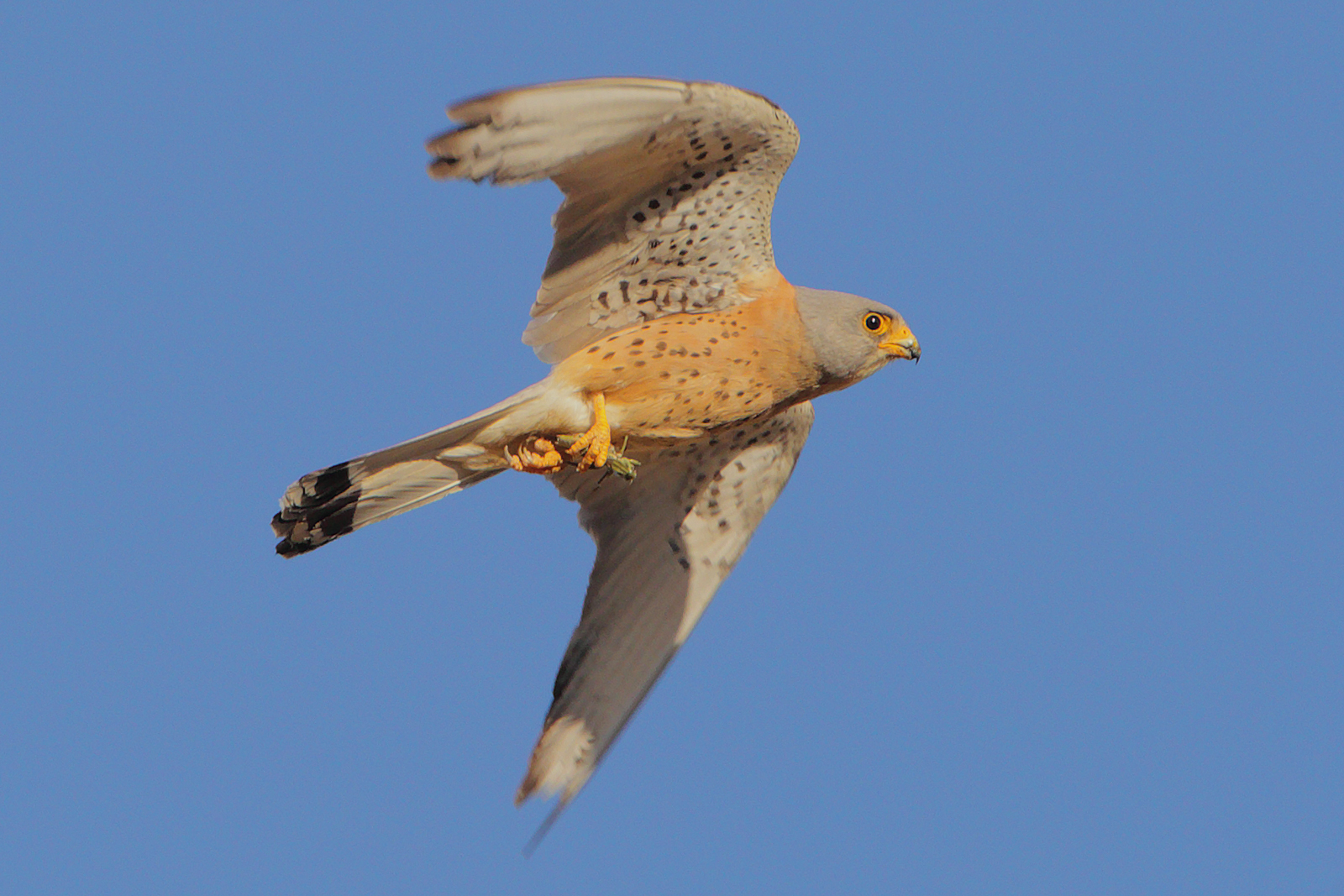
Lesser kestrel, La Cañada, Ávila

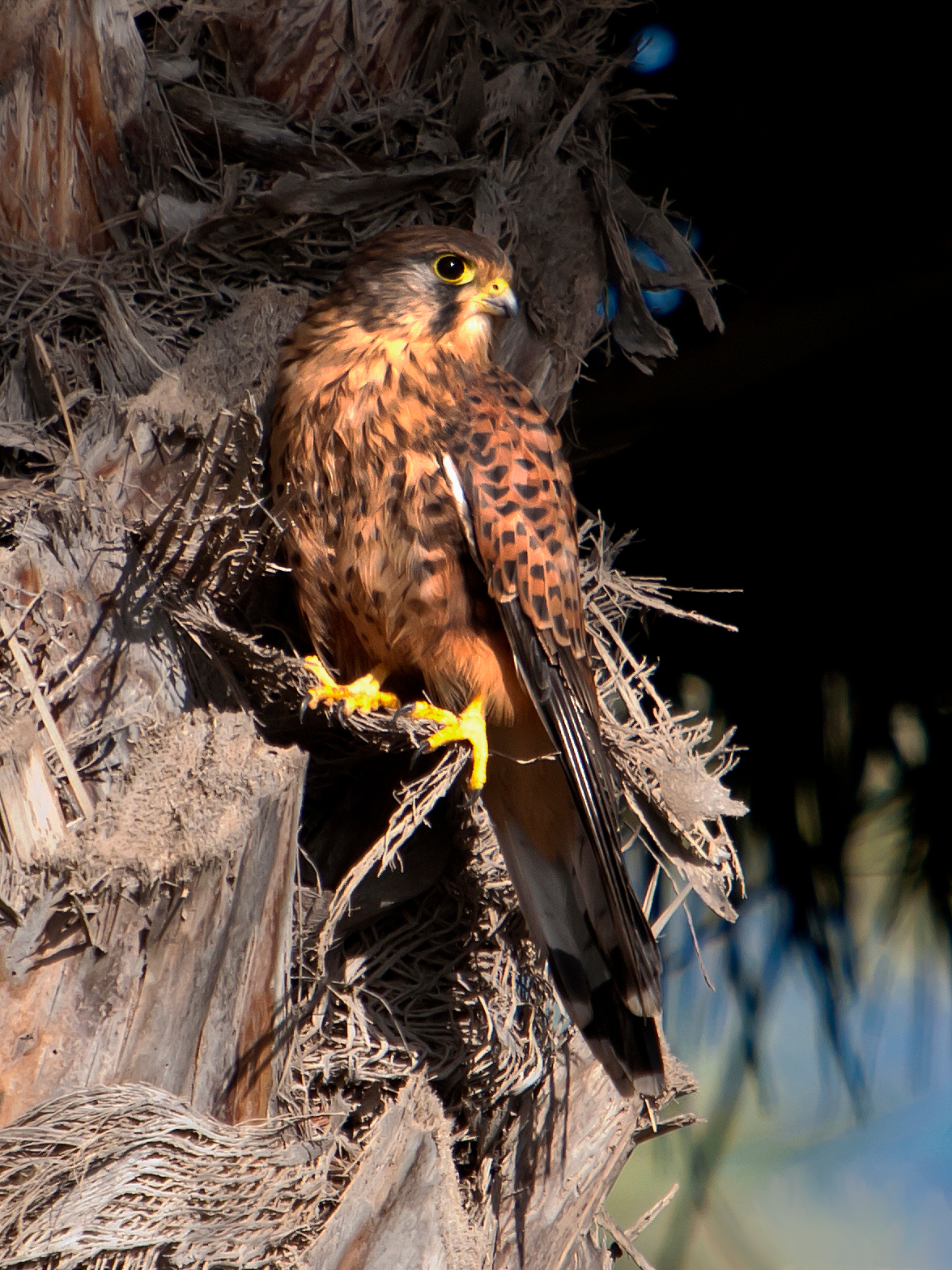
Eurasian kestrel (F. t. canariensis), Gran Canaria

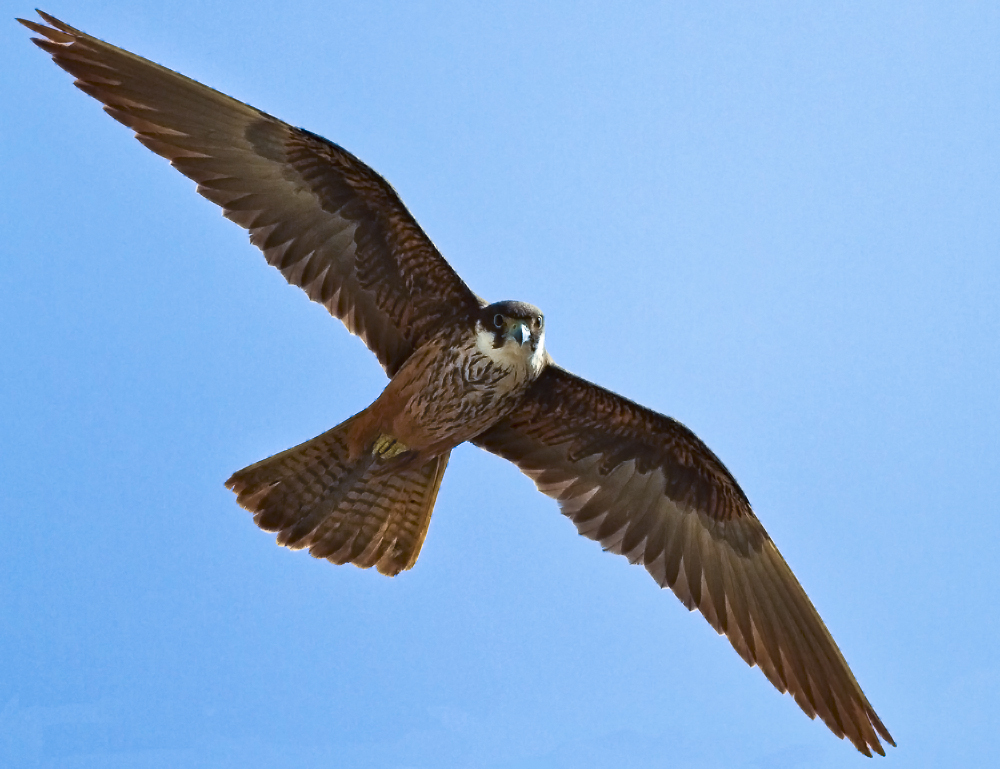
Eleonora's falcon, Cap Formentor, Mallorca

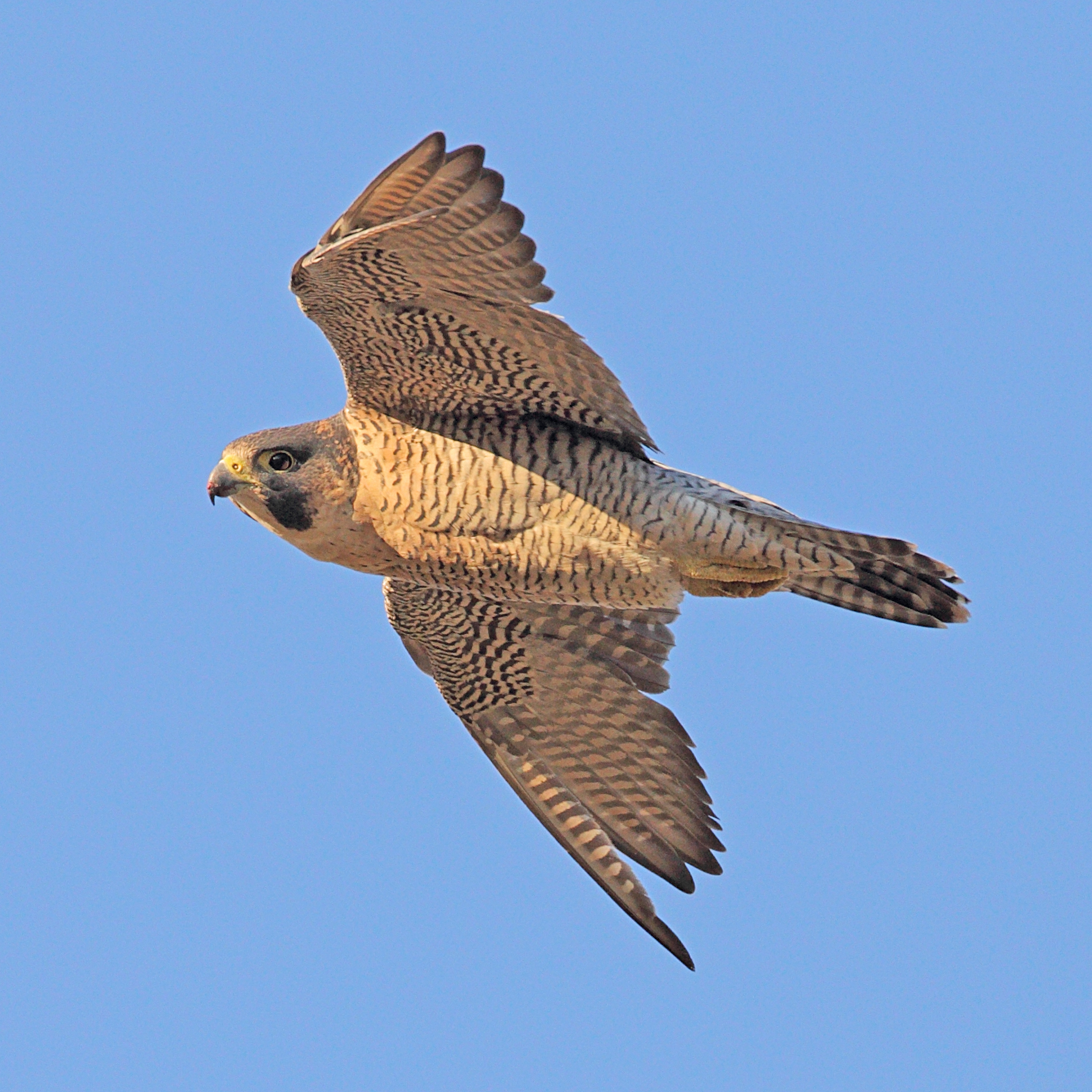
Peregrine falcon, La Cañada, Ávila

== African and New World parrots ==
Order: Psittaciformes Family: Psittacidae

Characteristic features of parrots include a strong curved bill, an upright stance, strong legs, and clawed zygodactyl feet. Many parrots are vividly coloured, and some are multi-coloured. In size they range from 8 cm (3.1 in) to 1 m (3.3 ft) in length. Most of the more than 150 species in the family are found in the New World. They are popular as cagebirds and some have established feral populations away from their native ranges.

- Monk parakeet (cotorra argentina), Myiopsitta monachus (C)
- Mitred parakeet (aratinga mitrada), Psittacara mitratus (C)
- Red-masked parakeet (aratinga de Guayaquil), Psittacara erythrogenys (C)
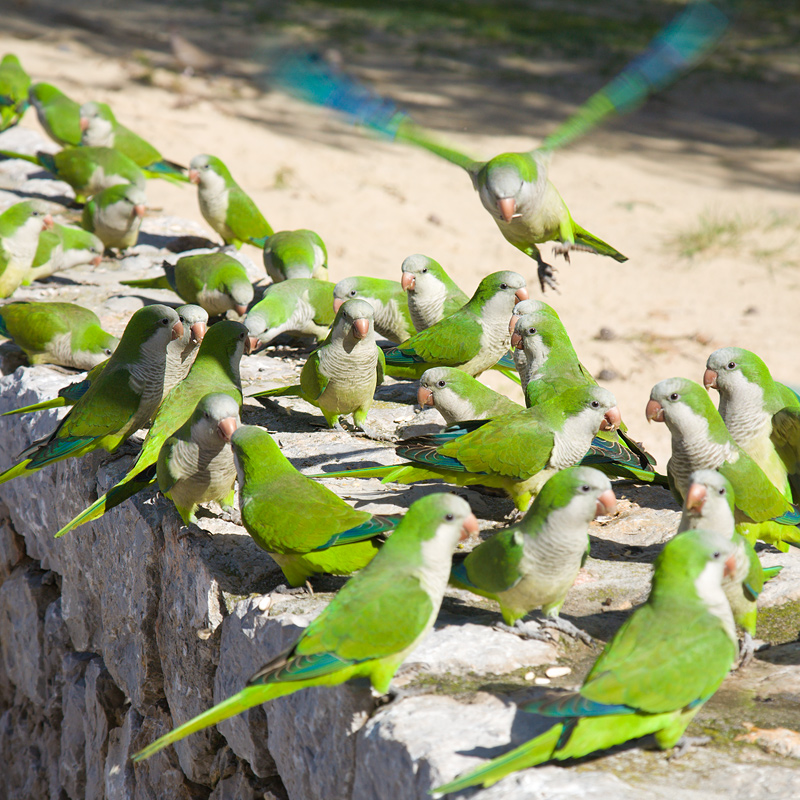
Monk parakeets, Santa Ponsa

== Old World parrots ==
Order: Psittaciformes Family: Psittaculidae

Characteristic features of parrots include a strong curved bill, an upright stance, strong legs, and clawed zygodactyl feet. Many parrots are vividly coloured, and some are multi-coloured. In size they range from 8 cm (3.1 in) to 1 m (3.3 ft) in length. Old World parrots are found from Africa east across south and southeast Asia and Oceania to Australia and New Zealand. They are popular as cagebirds and some have established feral populations away from their native ranges.

- Rose-ringed parakeet (cotorra de Kramer), Psittacula krameri (C)

== Bushshrikes and allies ==
Order: Passeriformes Family: Malaconotidae

Bushshrikes are similar in habits to shrikes, hunting insects and other small prey from a perch on a bush. Although similar in build to the shrikes, these tend to be either colourful species or largely black; some species are quite secretive.

- Black-crowned tchagra (chagra del Senegal), Tchagra senegalus (R except for North African enclaves)

== Shrikes ==
Order: Passeriformes Family: Laniidae

Shrikes are passerine birds known for their habit of catching other birds and small animals and impaling the uneaten portions of their bodies on thorns. A shrike's beak is hooked, like that of a typical bird of prey.

- Brown shrike (alcaudón pardo), Lanius cristatus (R)
- Red-backed shrike (alcaudón dorsirrojo), Lanius collurio
- Isabelline shrike (alcaudón isabel), Lanius isabellinus (R)
- Lesser grey shrike (alcaudón chico), Lanius minor
- Great grey shrike (alcaudón norteño), Lanius excubitor (R except for North African enclaves)
- Iberian grey shrike (alcaudón real), Lanius meridionalis
- Woodchat shrike (alcaudón común), Lanius senator
- Masked shrike (alcaudón núbico), Lanius nubicus (R)
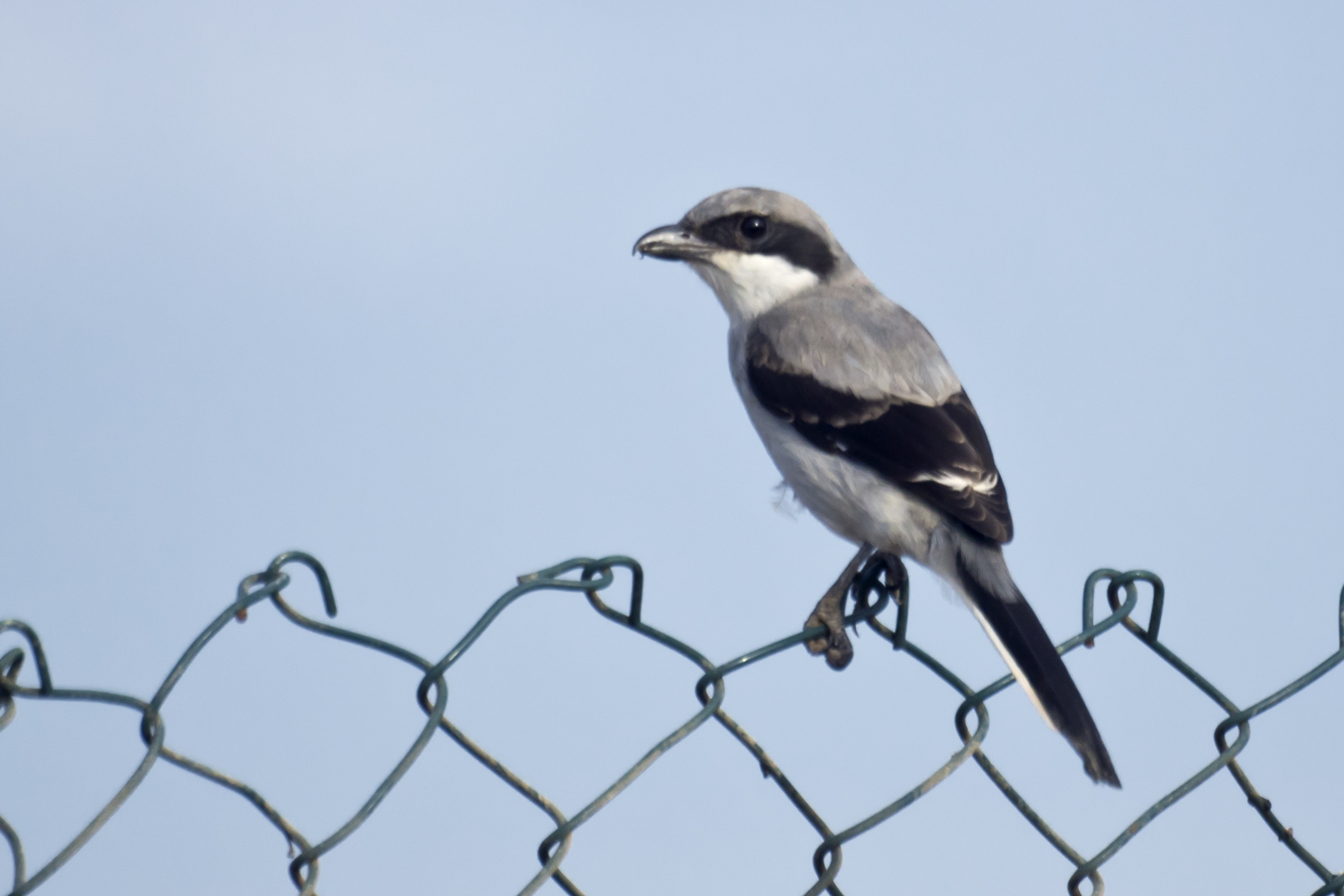
Iberian grey shrike, Las Palmas, Gran Canaria

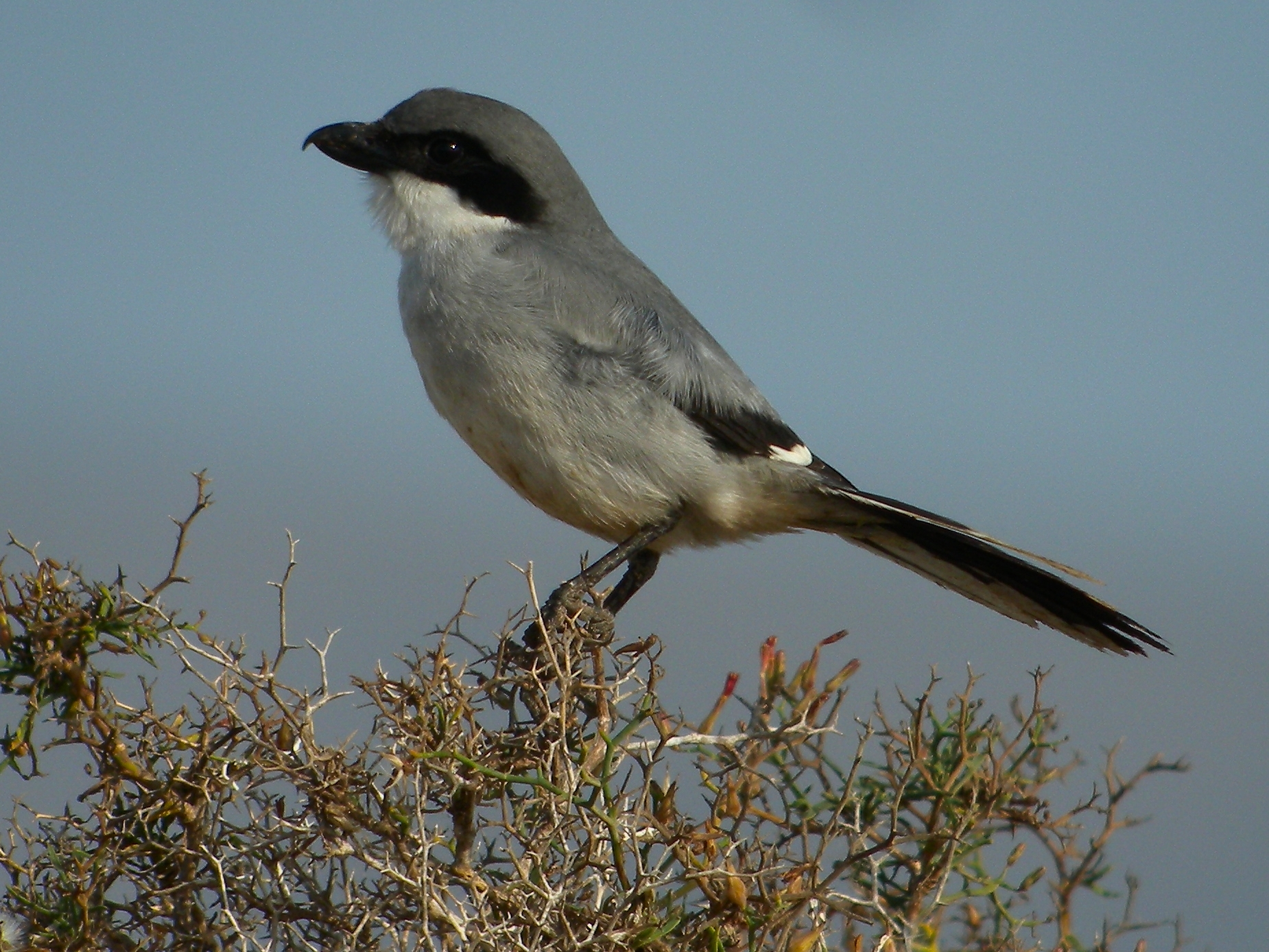
Great grey shrike, Lanzarote, Canary Islands

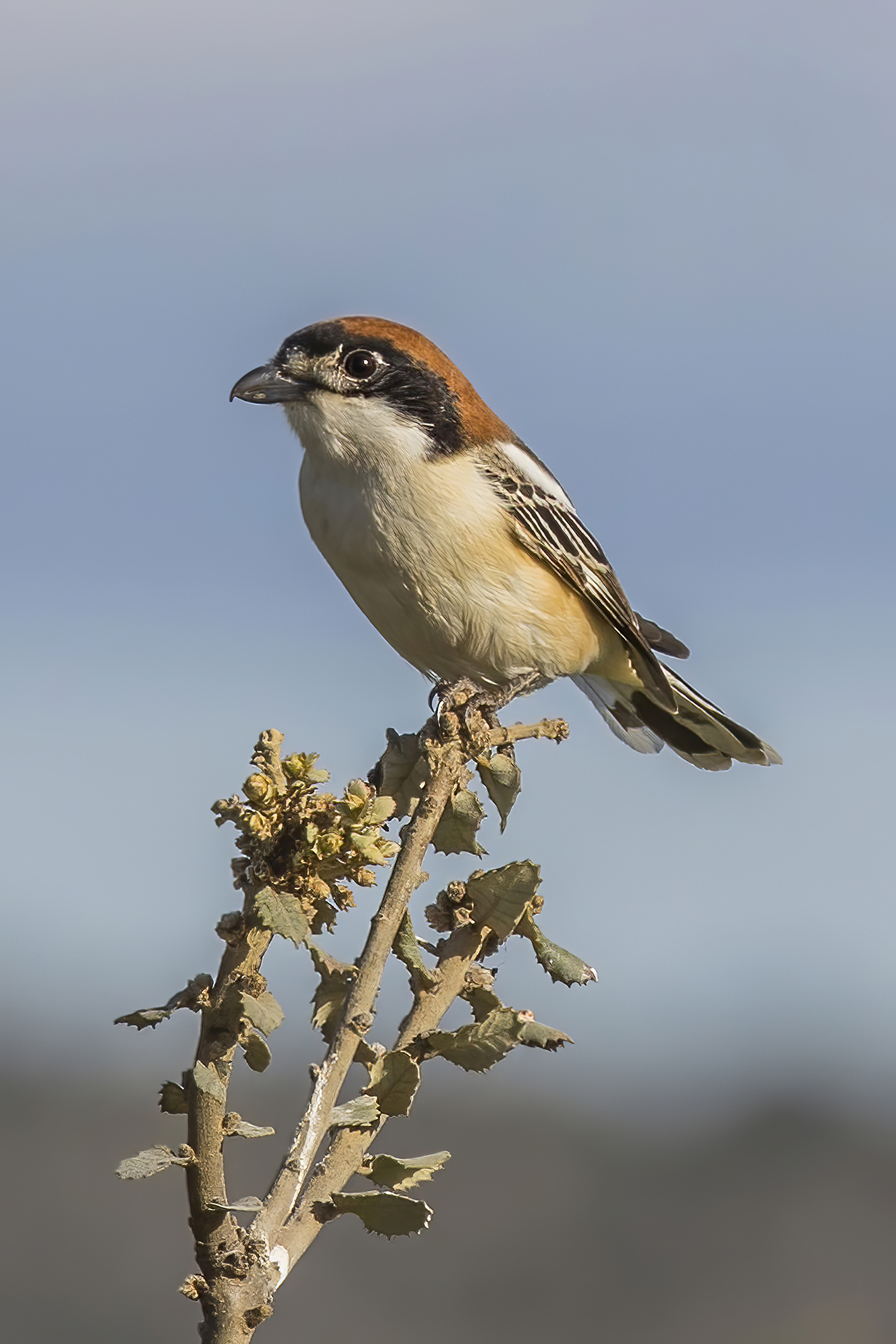
Woodchat shrike, Huelva

== Vireos and allies ==
Order: Passeriformes Family: Vireonidae

The vireos are a group of small to medium-sized passerine birds restricted to the New World and Southeast Asia; a few species are recorded as transatlantic vagrants to western Europe.

- Red-eyed vireo (vireo ojirrojo), Vireo olivaceus (R)

== Old World orioles ==
Order: Passeriformes Family: Oriolidae

The Old World orioles are colourful passerine birds. They are not related to the New World orioles.

- Eurasian golden oriole (oropéndola europea), Oriolus oriolus
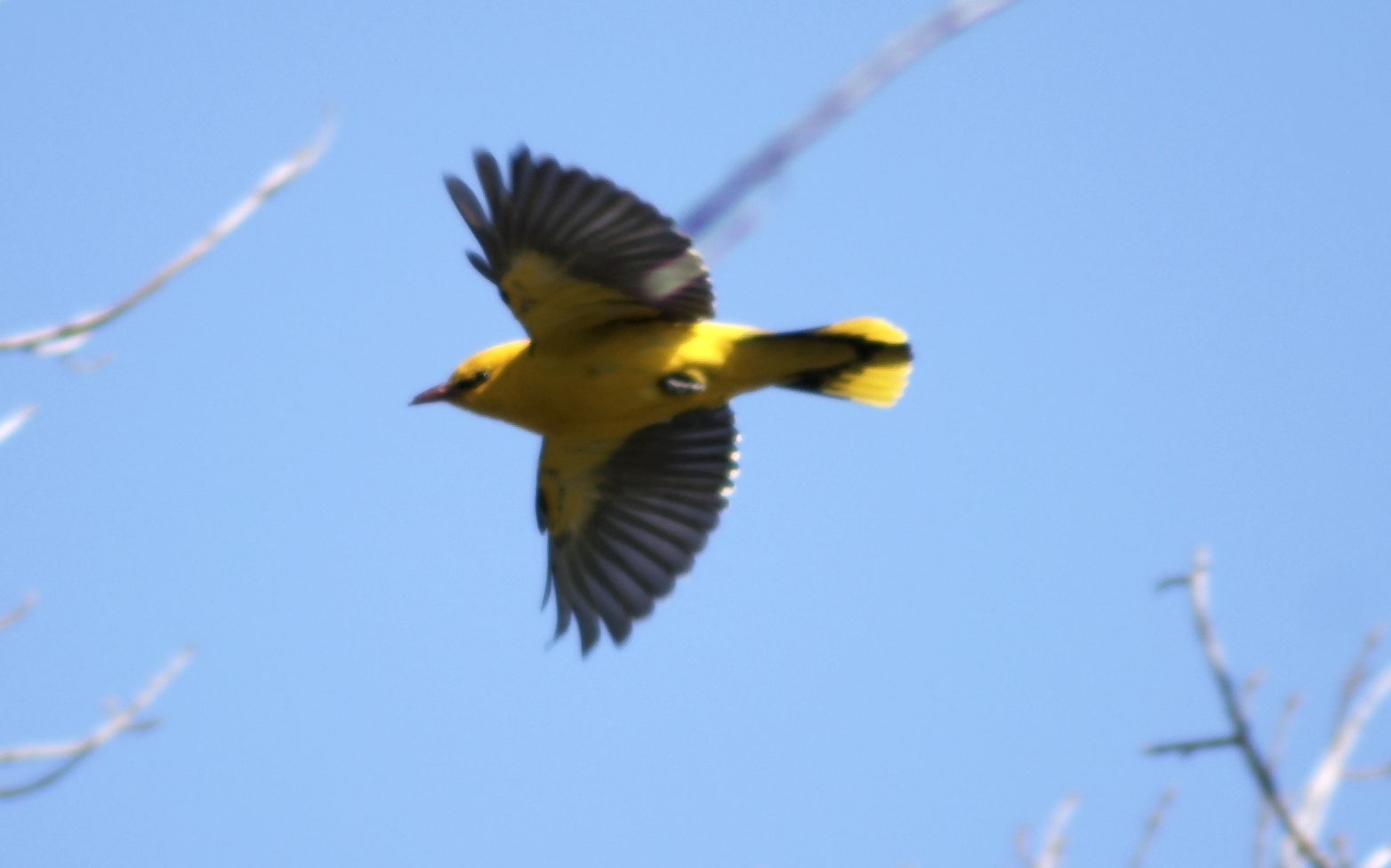
Eurasian golden oriole, Barcelona

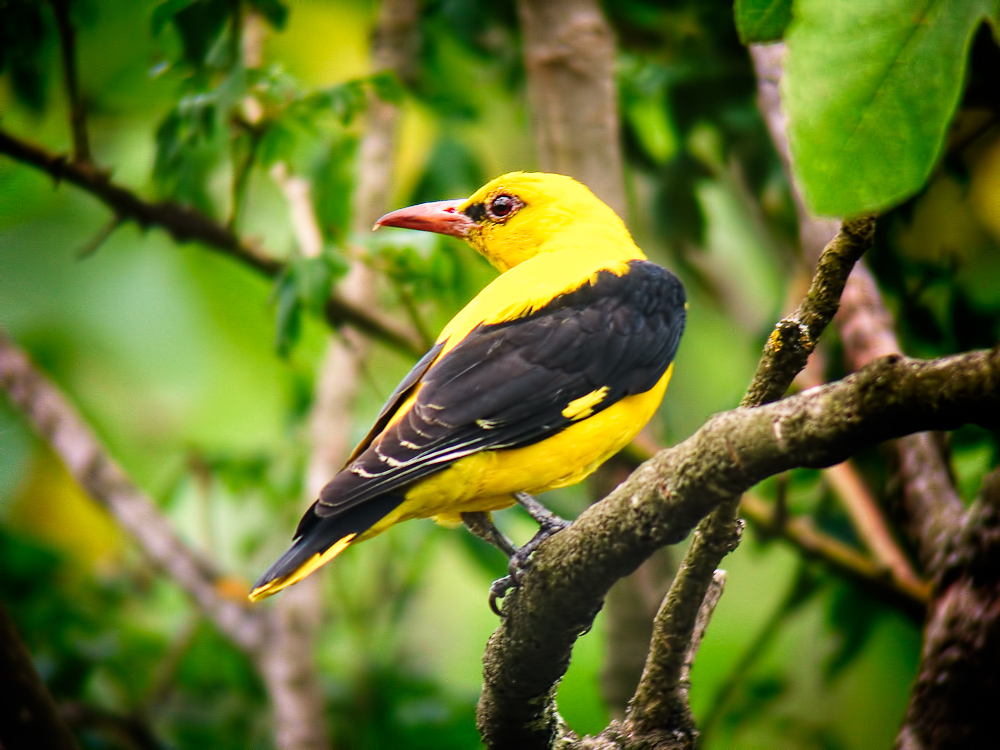
Eurasian golden oriole, Ayódar, Valencia

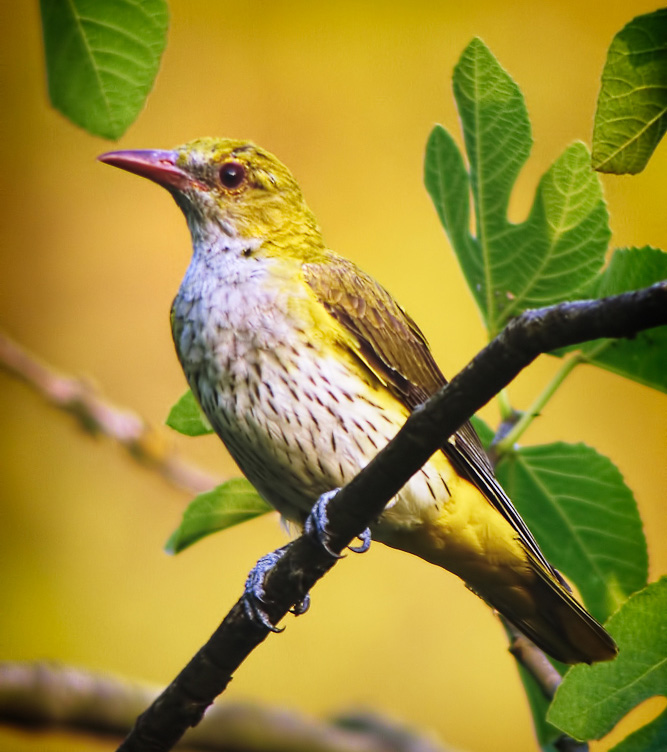
Eurasian golden oriole, Ayódar, Valencia

== Crows, jays, and magpies ==
Order: Passeriformes Family: Corvidae

The family Corvidae includes crows, ravens, jays, choughs, magpies, treepies, nutcrackers and ground jays. Corvids are above average in size among the Passeriformes, and some of the larger species show high levels of intelligence.

- Eurasian jay (arrendajo euroasiático), Garrulus glandarius
- Iberian magpie (rabilargo ibérico), Cyanopica cooki
- Eurasian magpie (urraca común), Pica pica
- Maghreb magpie (urraca magrebí), Pica mauritanica (R except for North African enclaves)
- Eurasian nutcracker (cascanueces norteño), Nucifraga caryocatactes (R)
- Red-billed chough (chova piquirroja), Pyrrhocorax pyrrhocorax
- Yellow-billed chough (chova piquigualda), Pyrrhocorax graculus
- Eurasian jackdaw (grajilla occidental), Coloeus monedula
- Rook (graja), Corvus frugilegus
- Carrion crow (corneja negra), Corvus corone
- Hooded crow (corneja cenicienta), Corvus cornix (R)
- Brown-necked raven (cuervo desertícola), Corvus ruficollis (R)
- Common raven (cuervo grande), Corvus corax
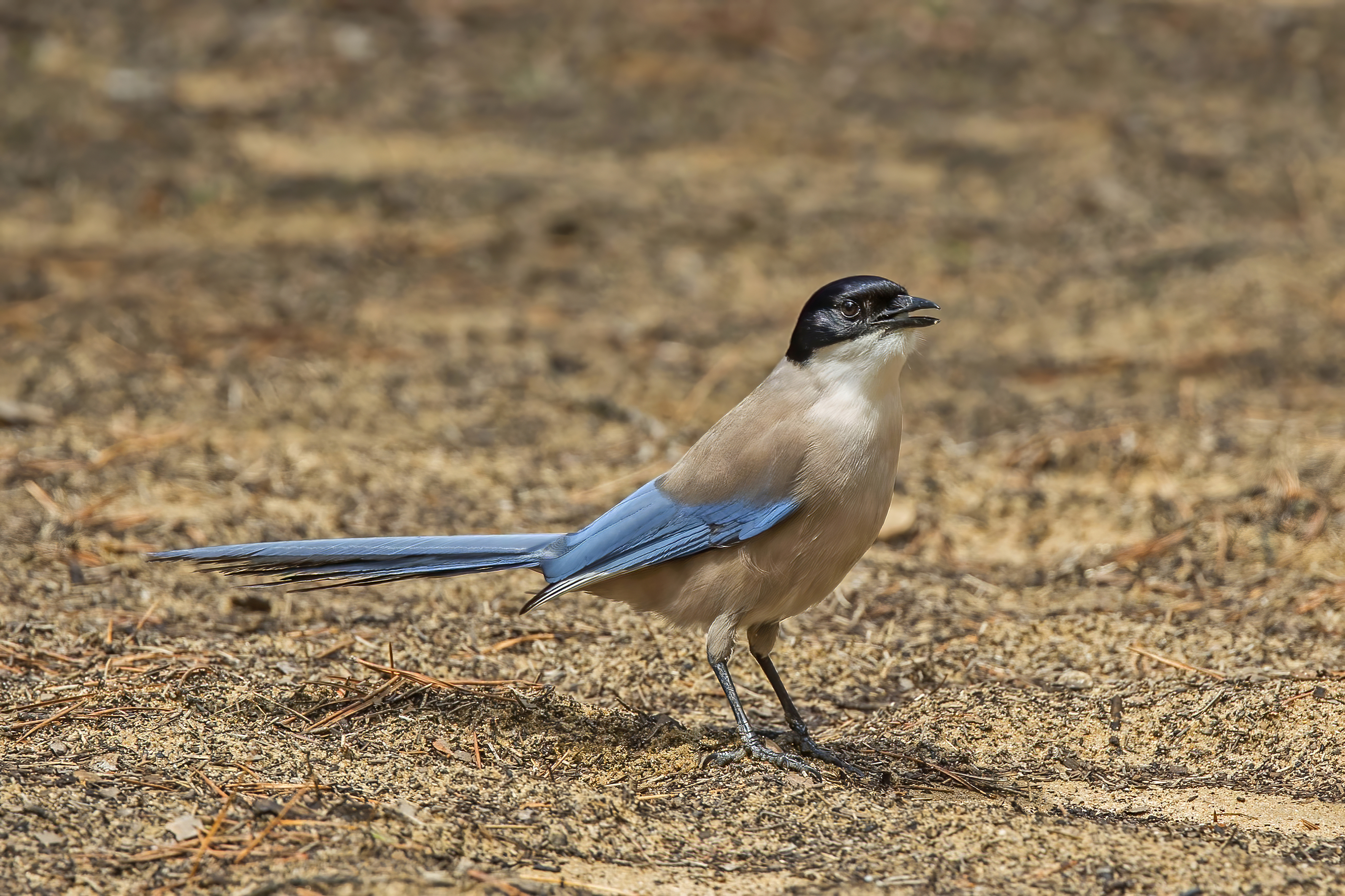
Iberian magpie, Almonte

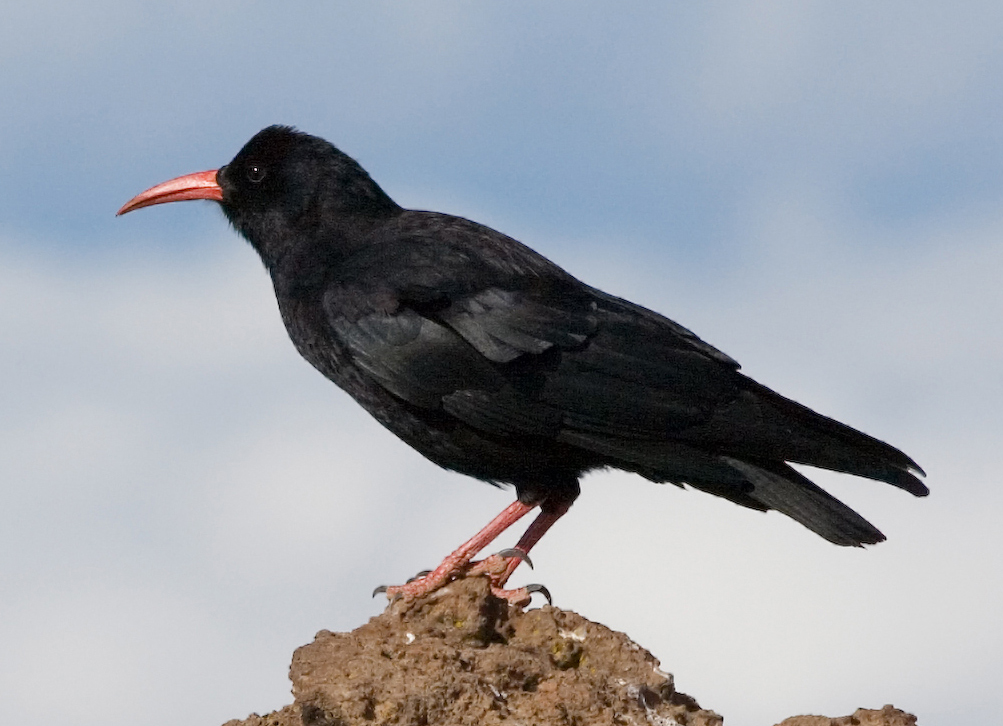
Red-billed chough, La Palma, Canary Islands

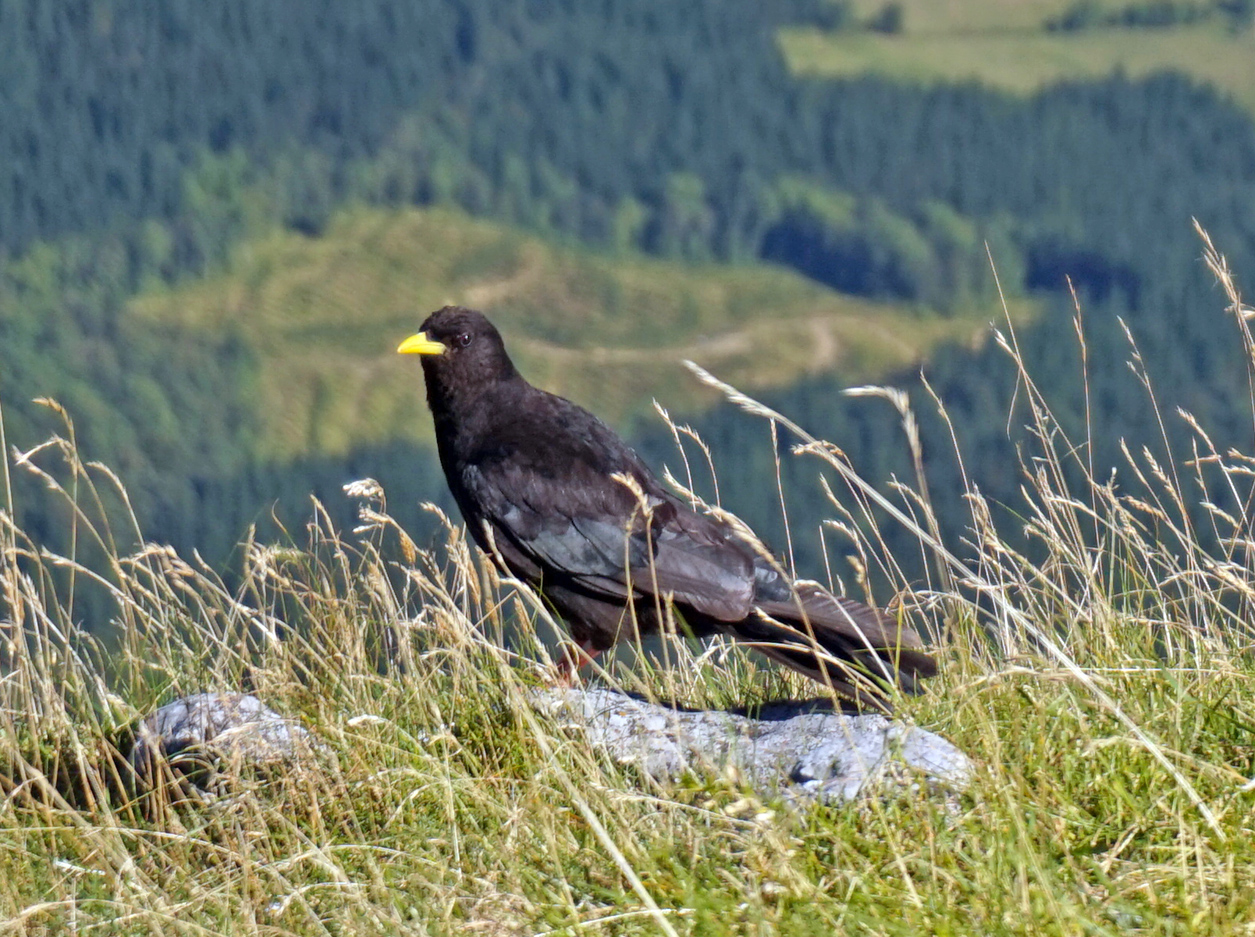
Yellow-billed chough, Urkiola Natural Park, Basque Country

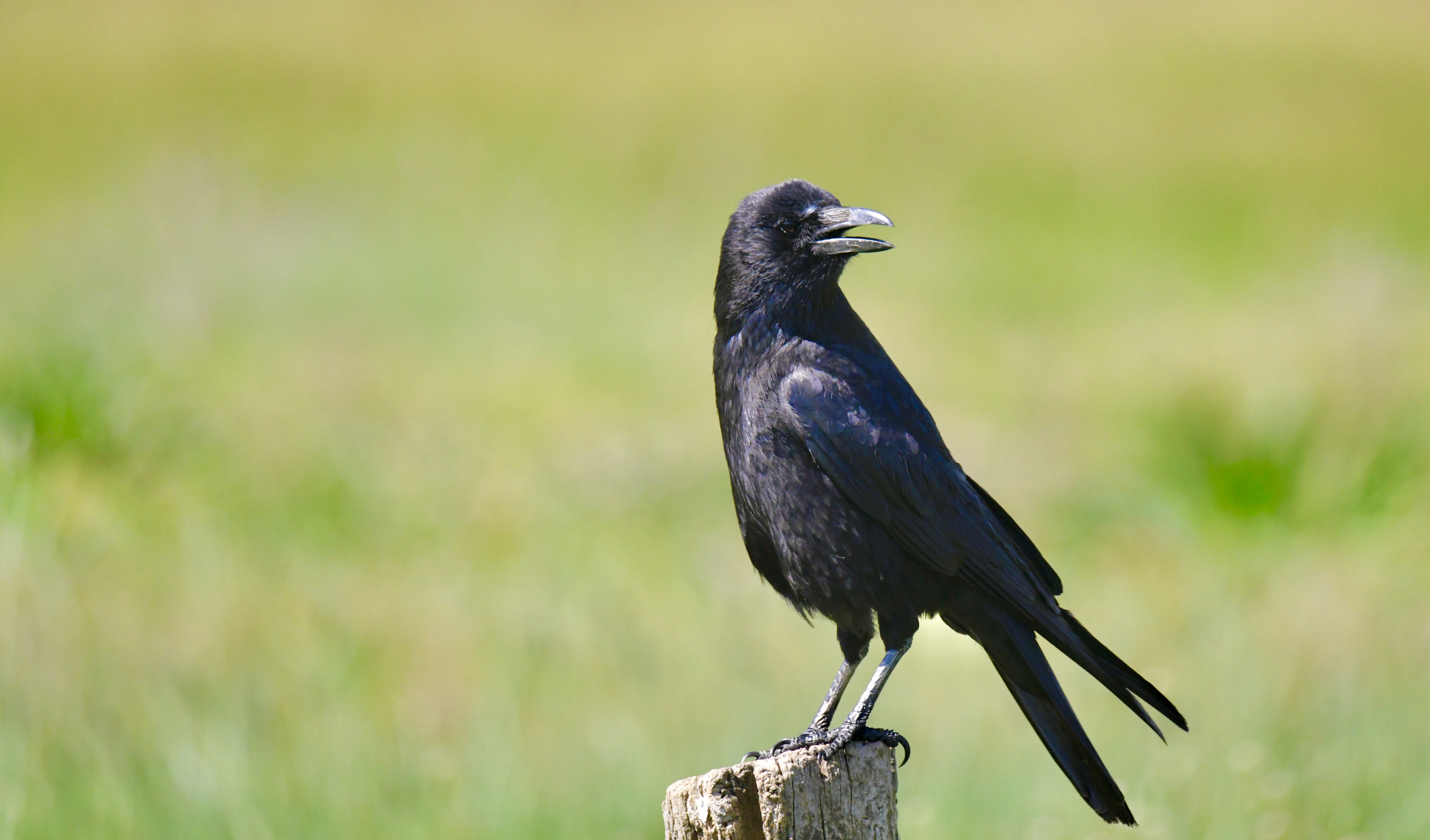
Carrion crow, Villafáfila, Zamora, Castile and León

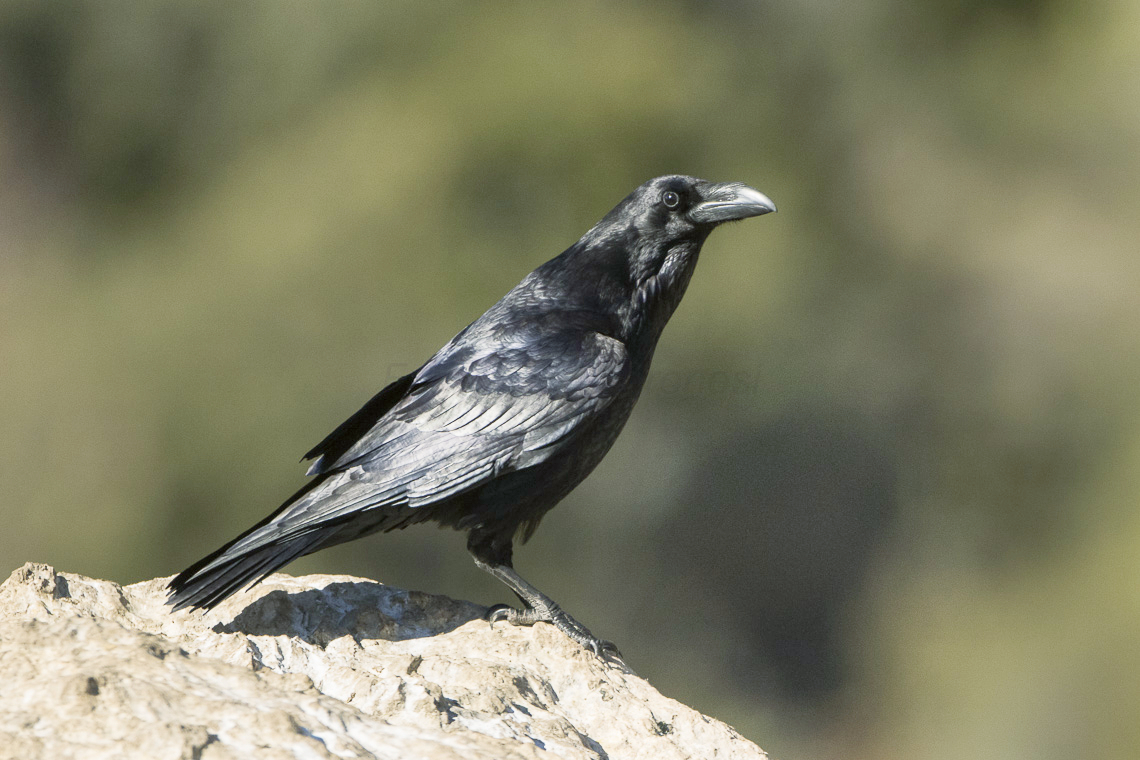
Common raven, Pyrenees, Catalonia

== Waxwings ==
Order: Passeriformes Family: Bombycillidae

The waxwings are a group of birds with soft silky plumage and unique red tips to some of the wing feathers. In the Bohemian and cedar waxwings, these tips look like sealing wax and give the group its name. These are arboreal birds of northern forests. They live on insects in summer and berries in winter.

- Bohemian waxwing (ampelis europeo), Bombycilla garrulus (R)

== Tits, chickadees, and titmice ==
Order: Passeriformes Family: Paridae

The Paridae are mainly small stocky woodland species with short stout bills. Some have crests. They are adaptable birds, with a mixed diet including seeds and insects.

- Coal tit (carbonero garrapinos), Periparus ater
- Crested tit (herrerillo capuchino), Lophophanes cristatus
- Marsh tit (carbonero palustre), Poecile palustris
- African blue tit (herrerillo canario), Cyanistes teneriffae
- Eurasian blue tit (herrerillo común), Cyanistes caeruleus
- Great tit (carbonero común), Parus major
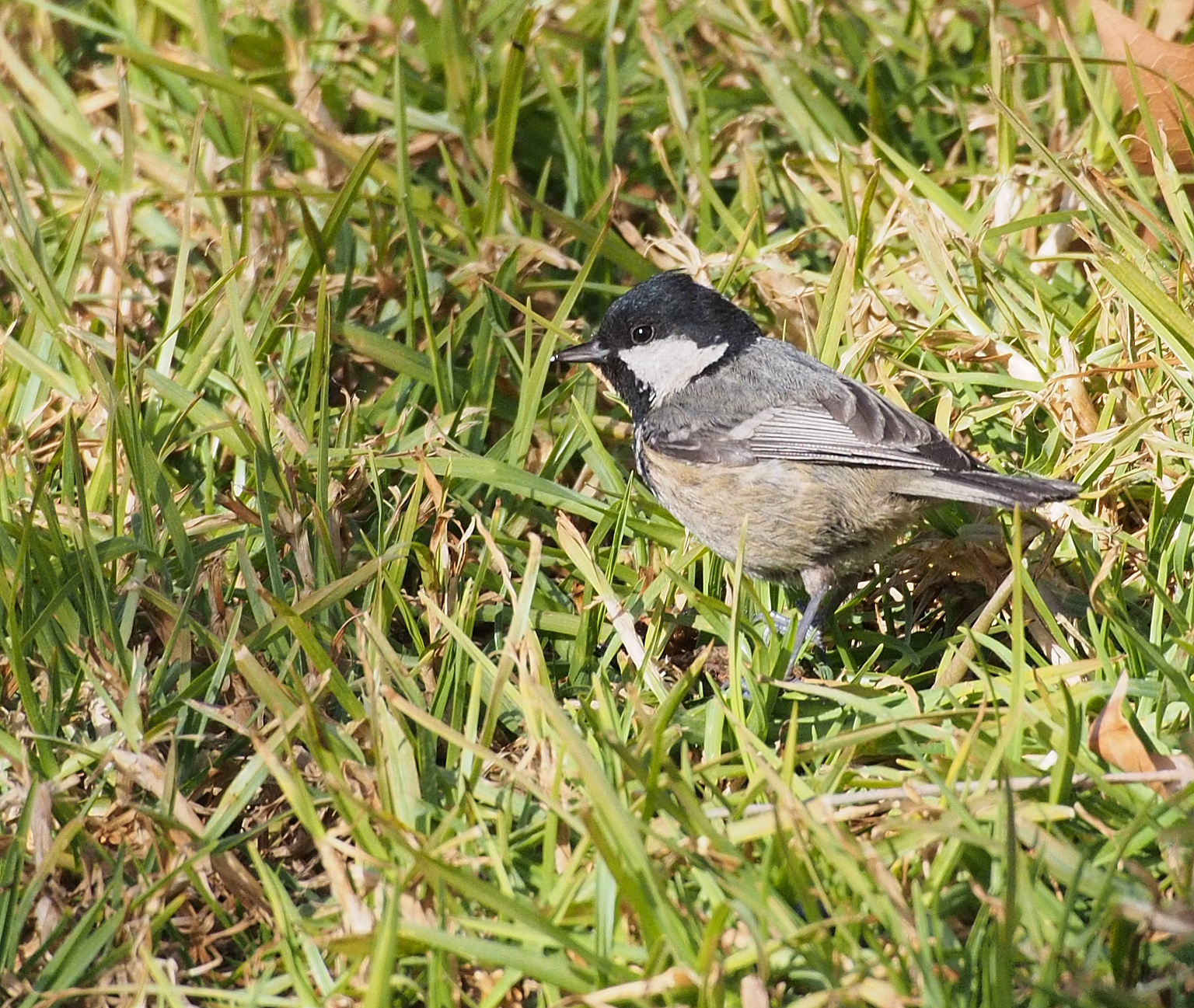
Coal tit, Madrid

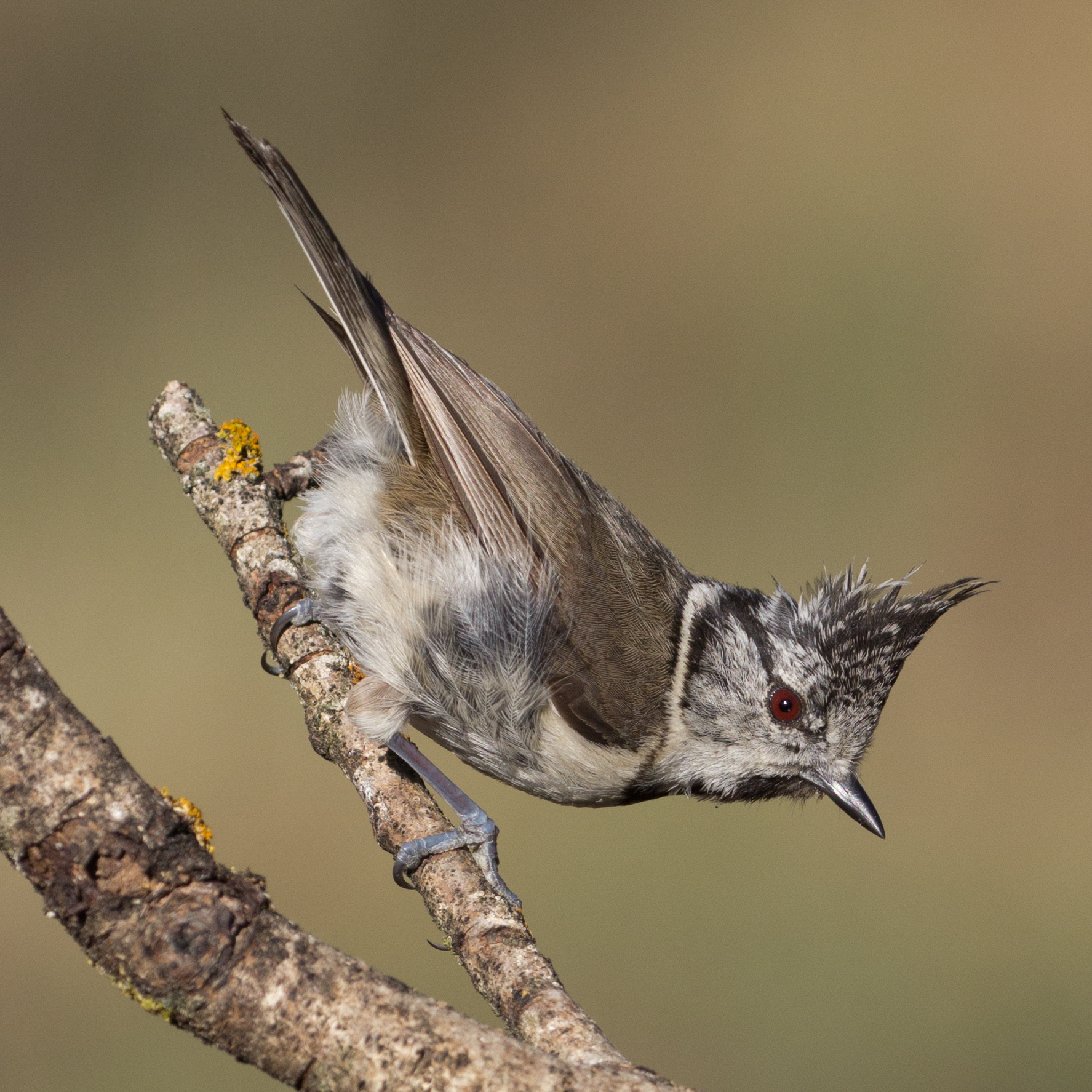
Crested tit, Cantalejo, Castile and León

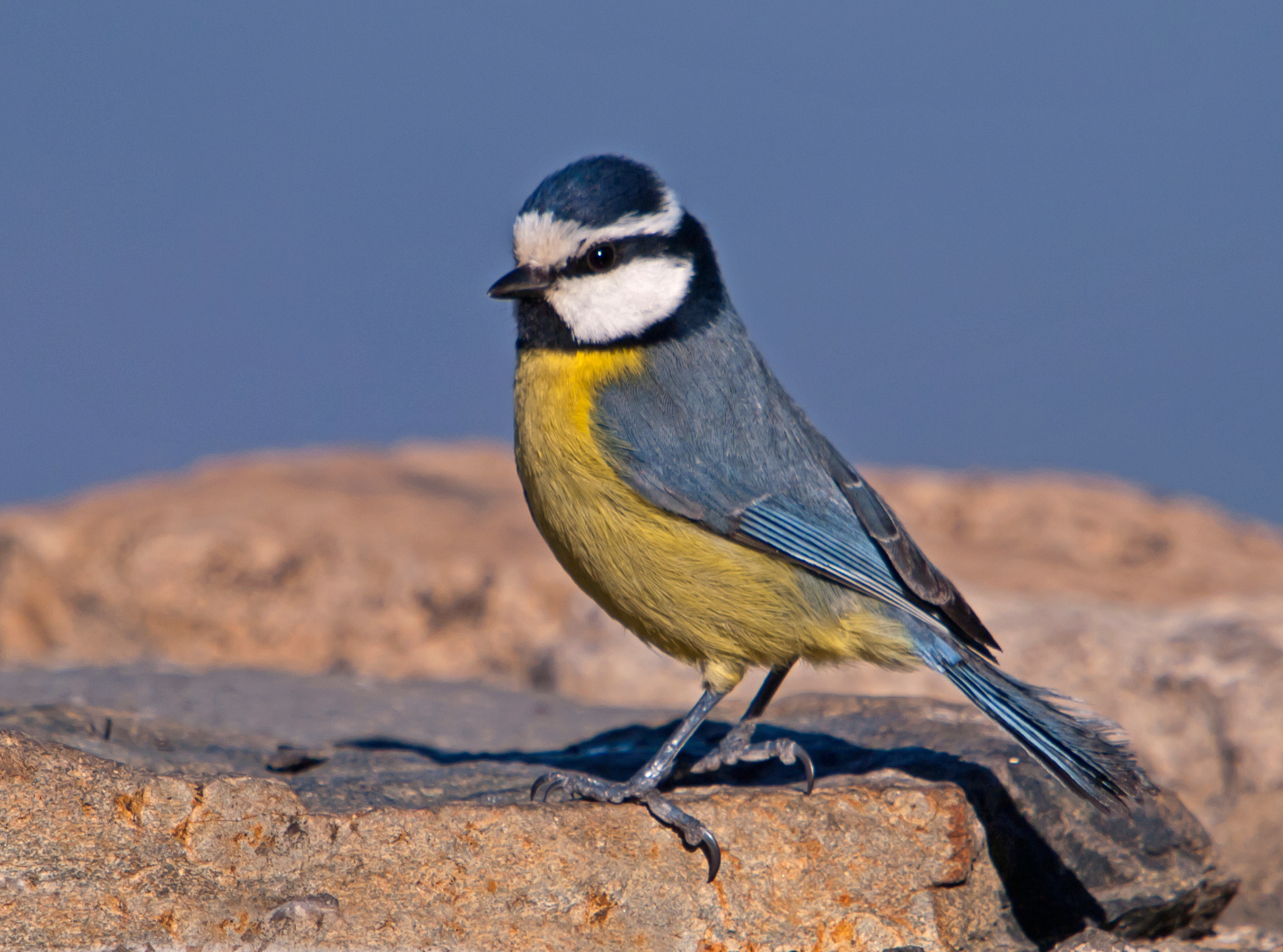
African blue tit, Gran Canaria

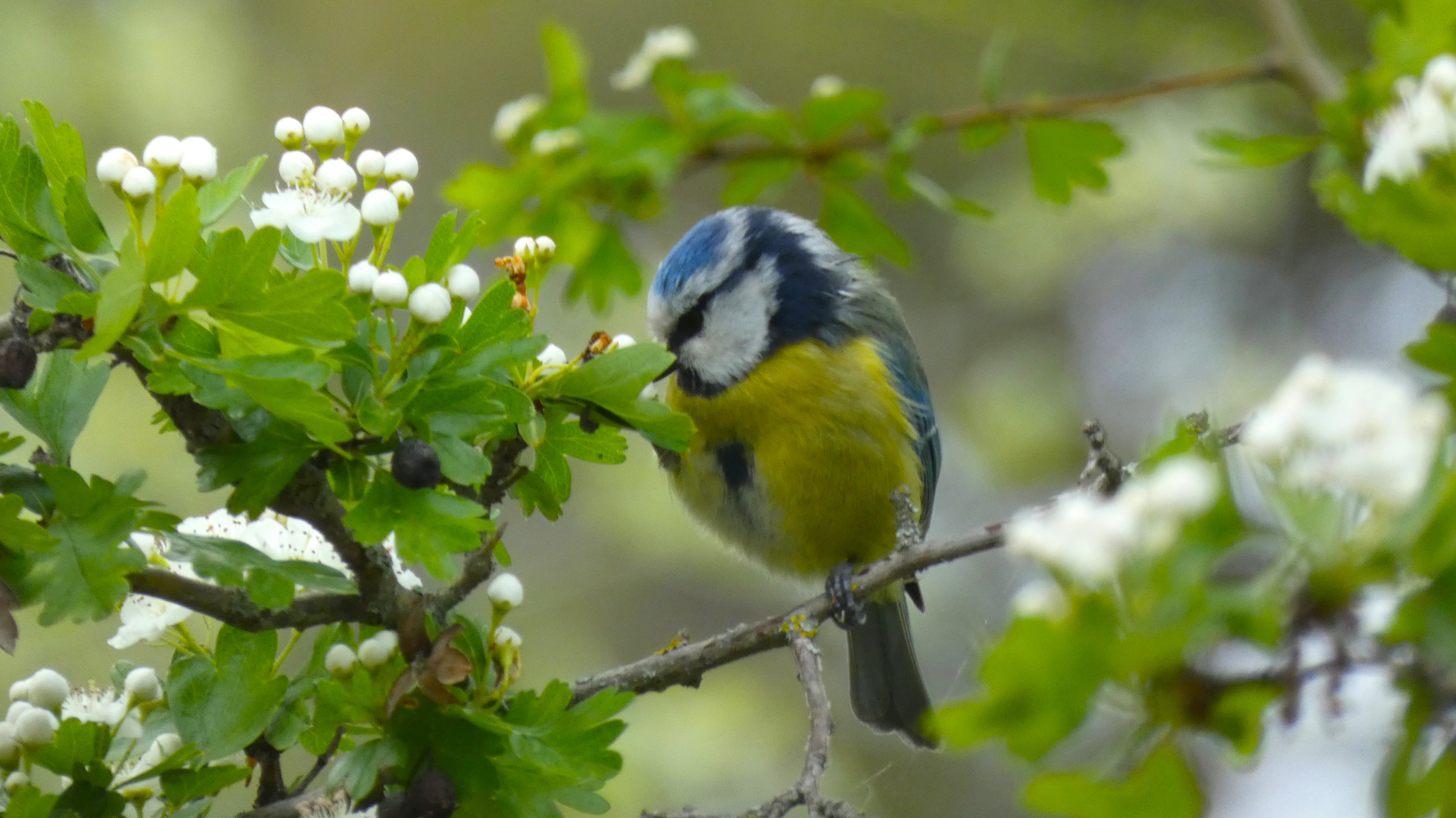
Eurasian blue tit, Logroño, La Rioja

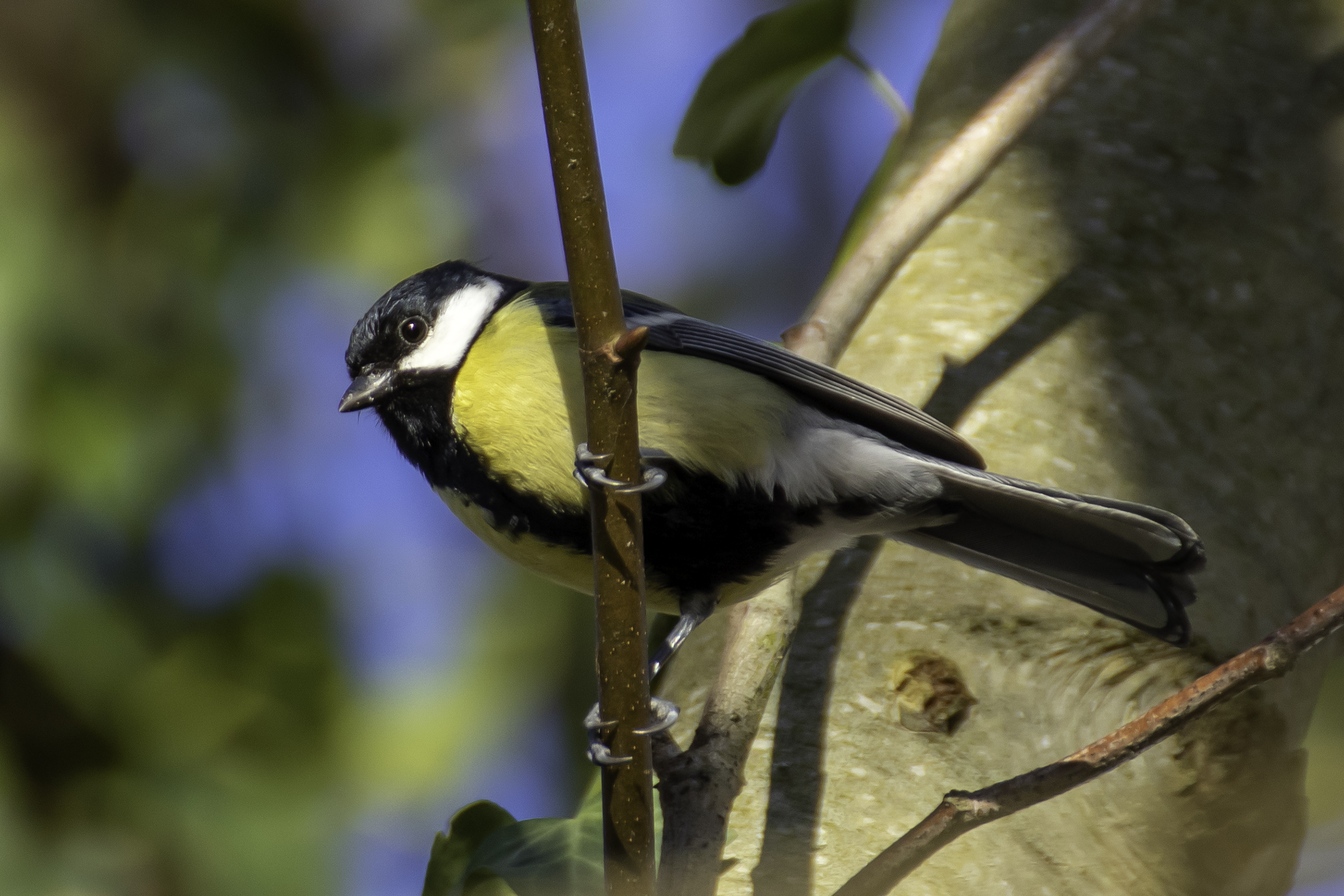
Great tit, Marín, Galicia

== Penduline tits ==
Order: Passeriformes Family: Remizidae

The penduline tits are a group of small passerine birds related to the true tits. They are insectivores.

- Eurasian penduline tit (pájaro moscón europeo), Remiz pendulinus

== Bearded reedling ==
Order: Passeriformes Family: Panuridae

This species, the only one in its family, is found in reed beds throughout temperate Europe and Asia.

- Bearded reedling (bigotudo), Panurus biarmicus

== Larks ==
Order: Passeriformes Family: Alaudidae

Larks are small terrestrial birds with often extravagant songs and display flights. Most larks are fairly dull in appearance. Their food is insects and seeds.

- Greater hoopoe-lark (alondra ibis), Alaemon alaudipes (R)
- Bar-tailed lark (terrera colinegra), Ammomanes cinctura (R)
- Wood lark (alondra totovía), Lullula arborea
- Eurasian skylark (alondra común), Alauda arvensis
- Thekla's lark (cogujada montesina), Galerida theklae
- Crested lark (cogujada común), Galerida cristata
- Shore lark (alondra cornuda), Eremophila alpestris (R)
- Greater short-toed lark (terrera común), Calandrella brachydactyla
- Bimaculated lark (calandria bimaculada), Melanocorypha bimaculata (R)
- Calandra lark (calandria común), Melanocorypha calandra
- Dupont's lark (alondra ricotí), Chersophilus duponti near-threatened
- Mediterranean short-toed lark (terrera marismeña), Alaudala rufescens
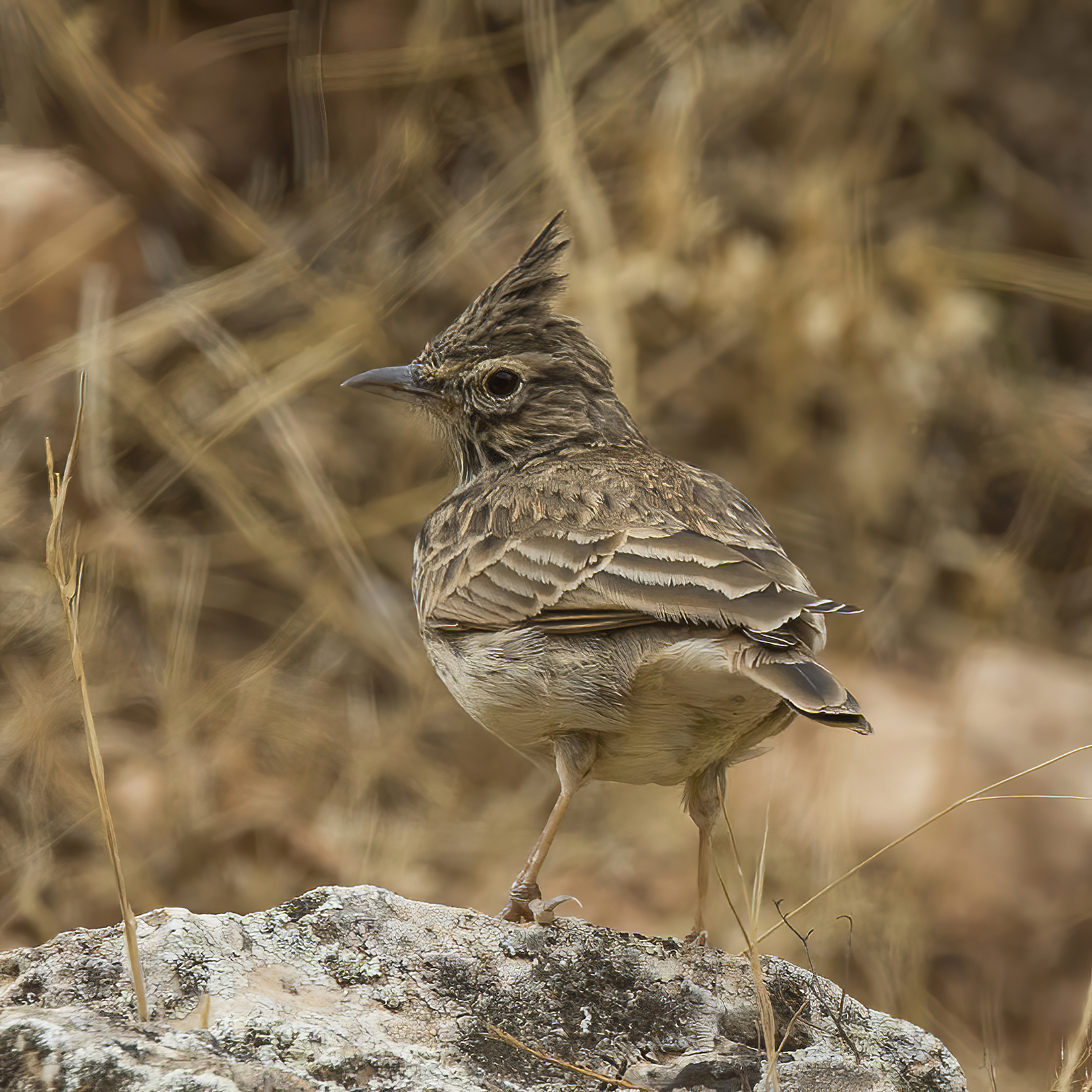
Thekla's lark, Loja, Granada

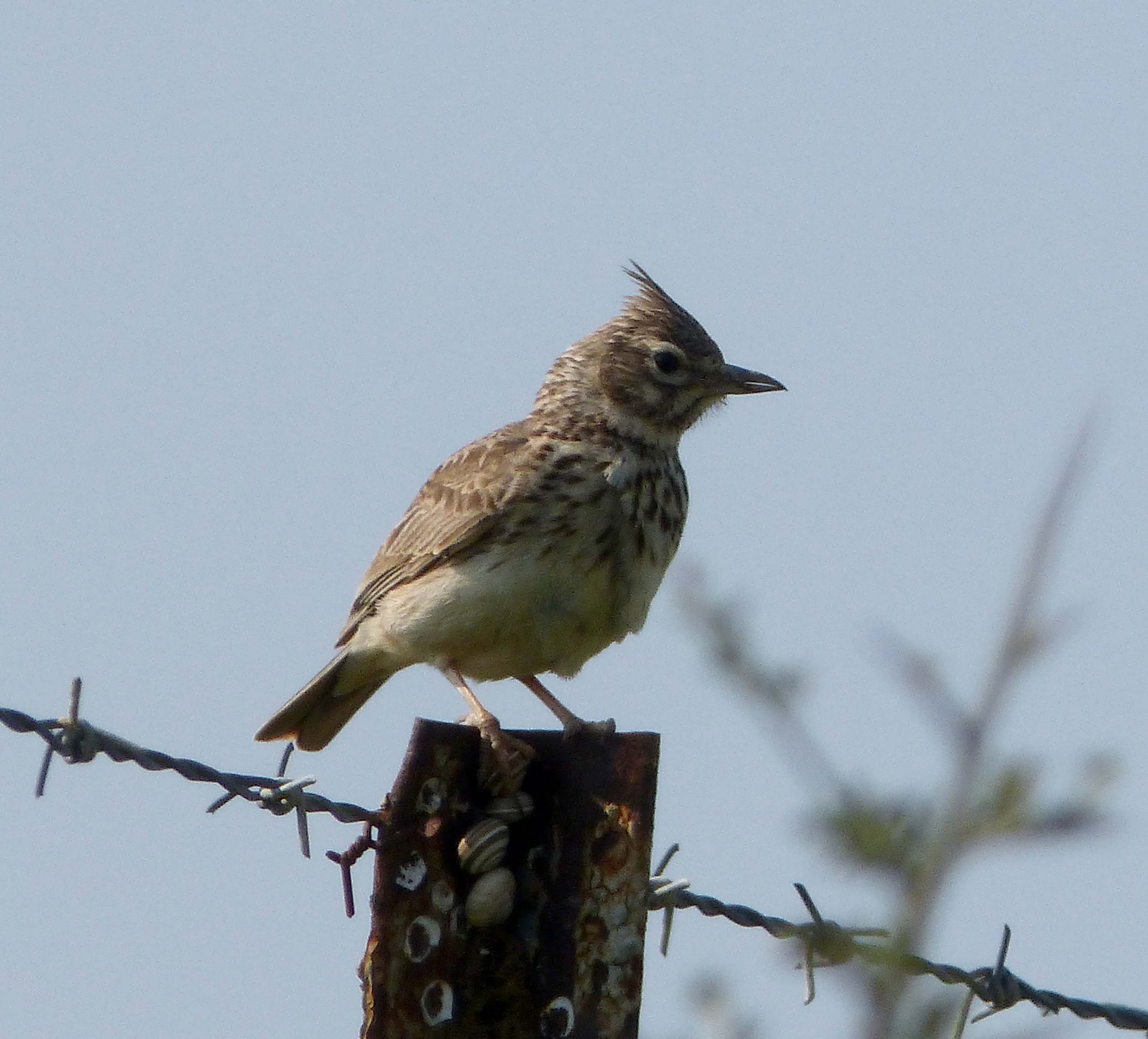
Crested lark, Andalusia

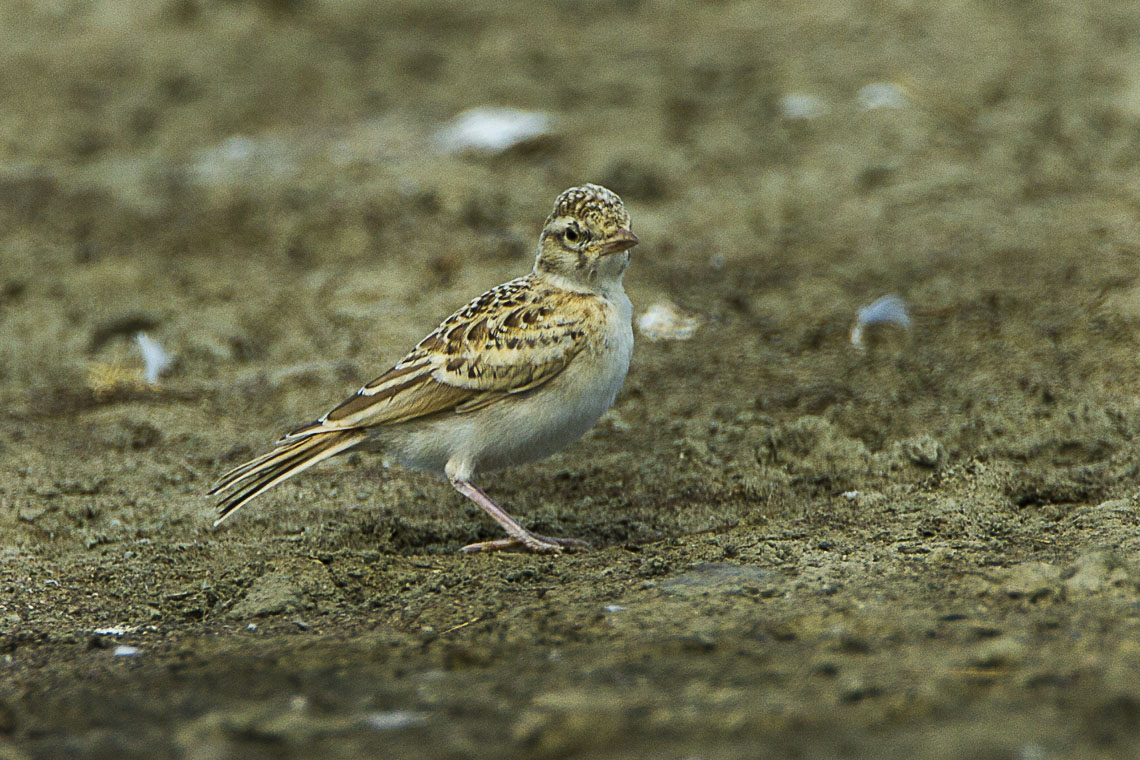
Greater short-toed lark, Spain

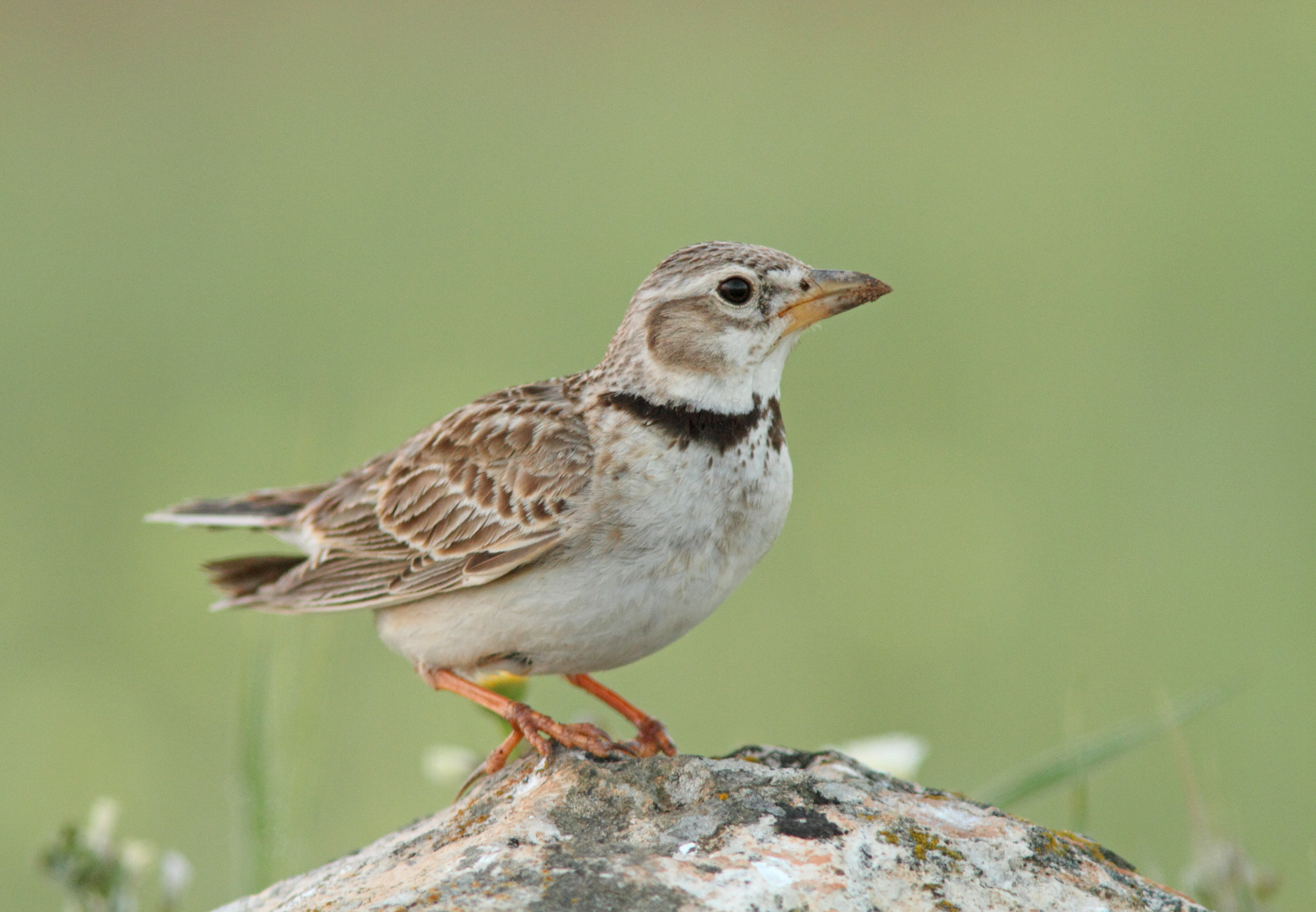
Calandra lark, Extremadura

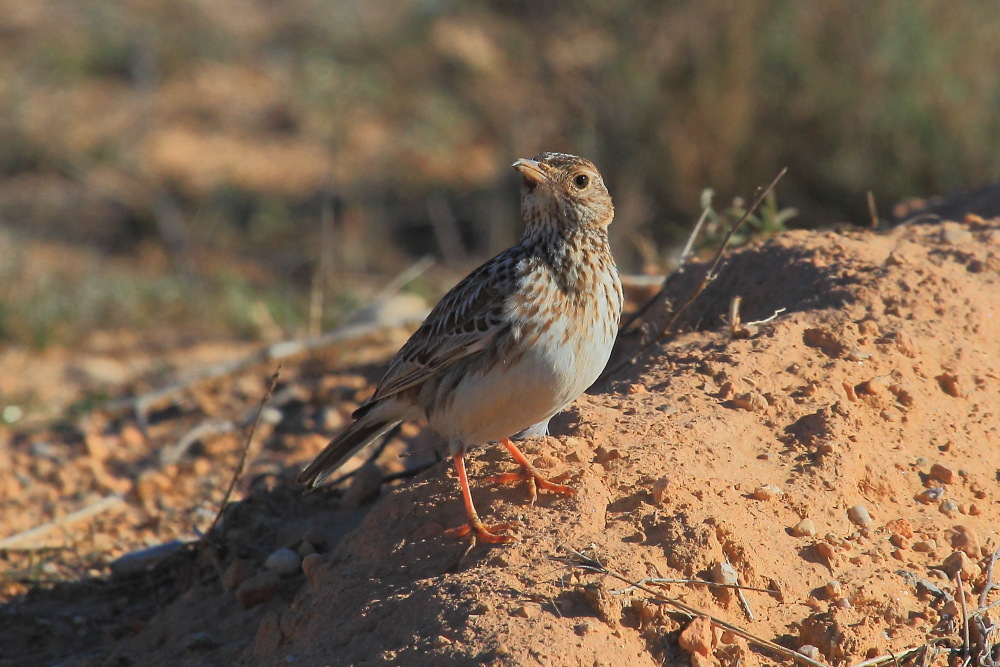
Dupont's lark, Lleida

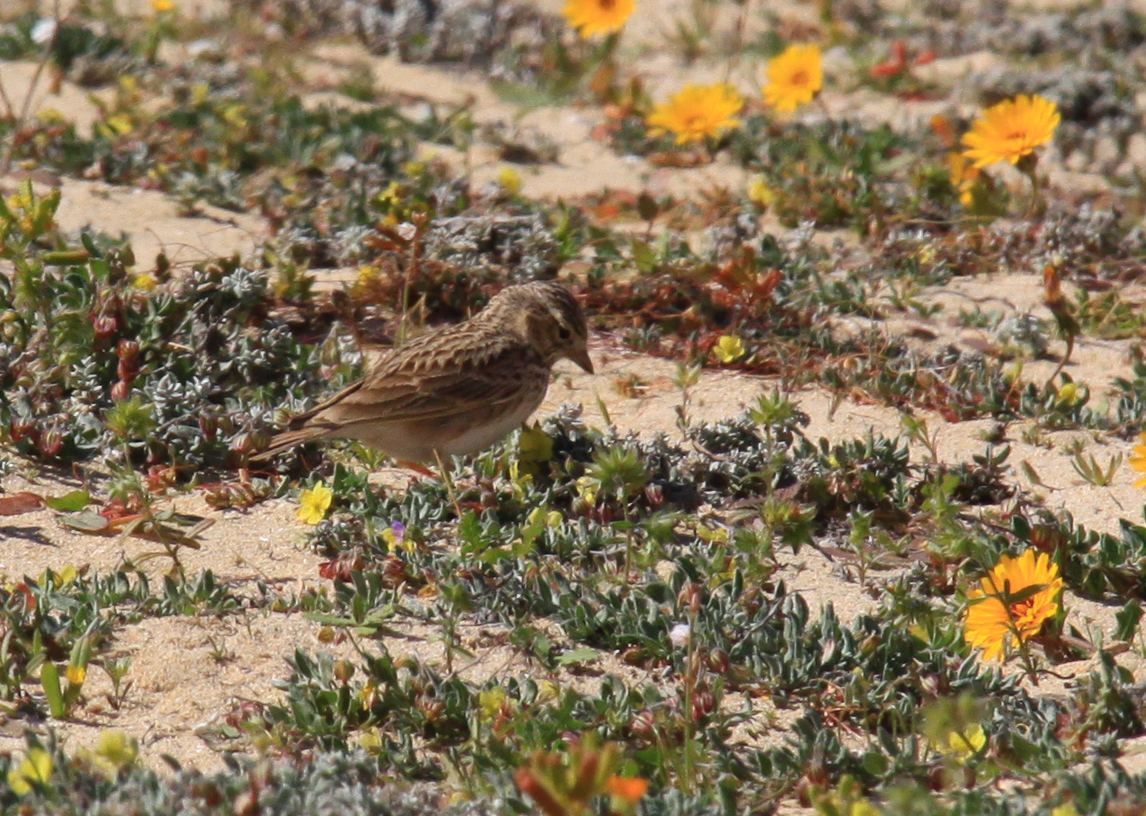
Mediterranean short-toed lark, Fuerteventura, Canary Islands

== Bulbuls ==
Order: Passeriformes Family: Pycnonotidae

Bulbuls are medium-sized songbirds. Some are colourful with yellow, red or orange vents, cheeks, throats or supercilia, but most are drab, with uniform olive-brown to black plumage. Some species have distinct crests.

- Red-whiskered bulbul (bulbul orfeo), Pycnonotus jocosus (C)
- Common bulbul (bulbul naranjero), Pycnonotus barbatus (R except for North African enclaves)

== Swallows ==
Order: Passeriformes Family: Hirundinidae

The family Hirundinidae is adapted to aerial feeding. They have a slender streamlined body, long pointed wings and a short bill with a wide gape. The feet are adapted to perching rather than walking, and the front toes are partially joined at the base.

- Sand martin (avión zapador), Riparia riparia
- Eurasian crag martin (avión roquero), Ptyonoprogne rupestris
- Barn swallow (golondrina común), Hirundo rustica
- Common house martin (avión común occidental), Delichon urbicum
- European red-rumped swallow (golondrina dáurica), Cecropis rufula
- American cliff swallow (golondrina risquera), Petrochelidon pyrrhonota (R)
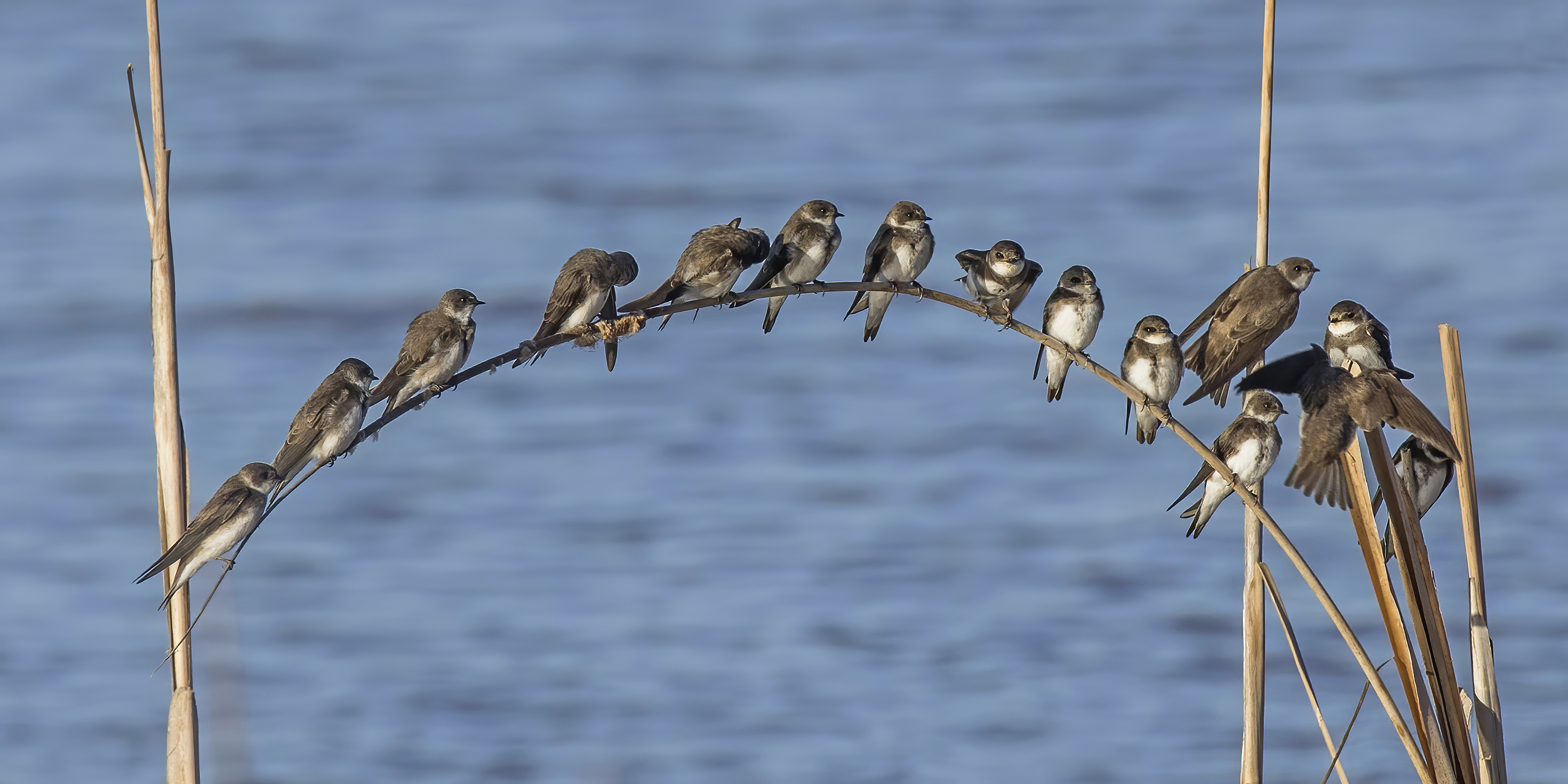
Sand martin, El Rocio

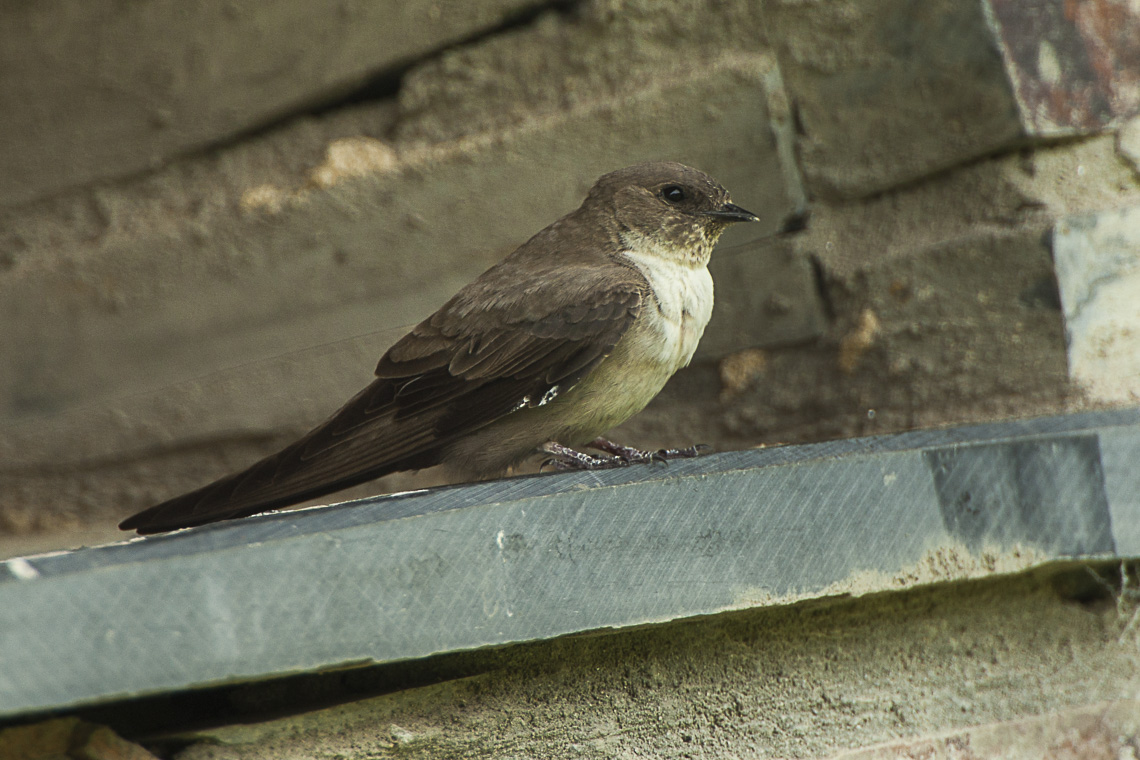
Eurasian crag martin, Extremadura

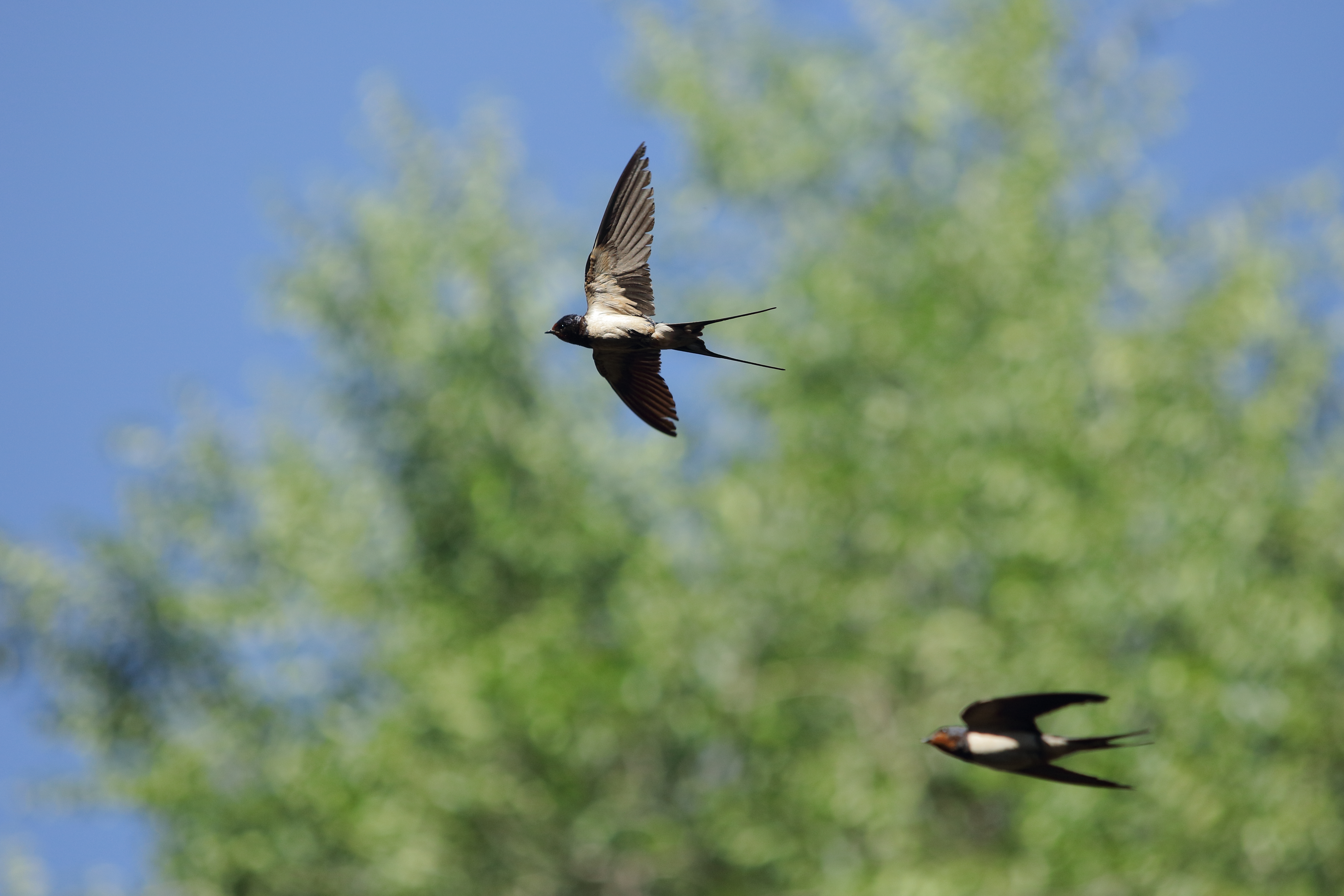
Barn swallows, Manzanares Linear Park, Madrid

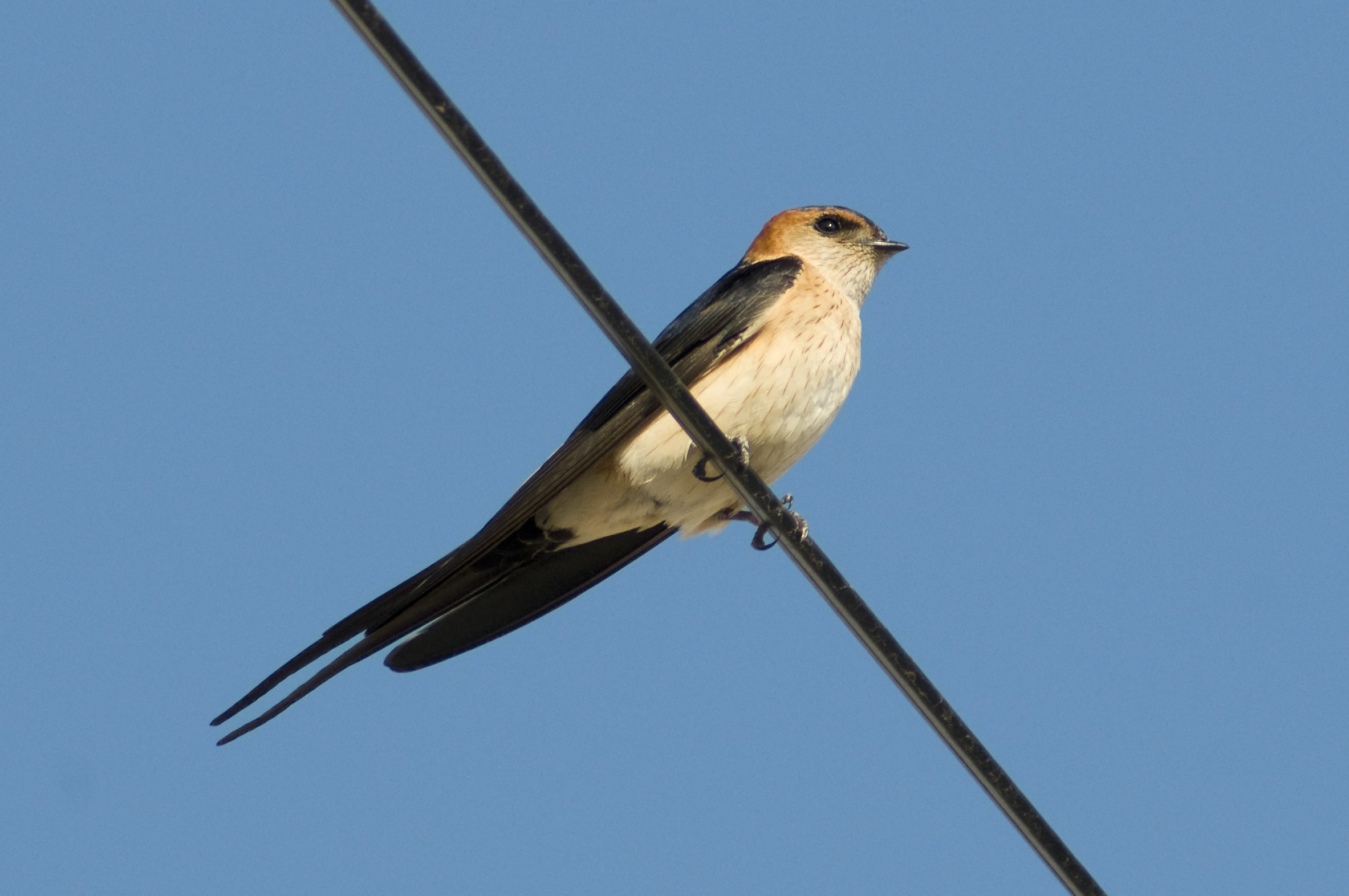
European red-rumped swallow, Calpe

== Bush warblers and allies ==
Order: Passeriformes Family: Cettiidae

The members of this family are found across southern and western Europe, Africa, Asia, and Polynesia.

- Cetti's warbler (cetia ruiseñor), Cettia cetti
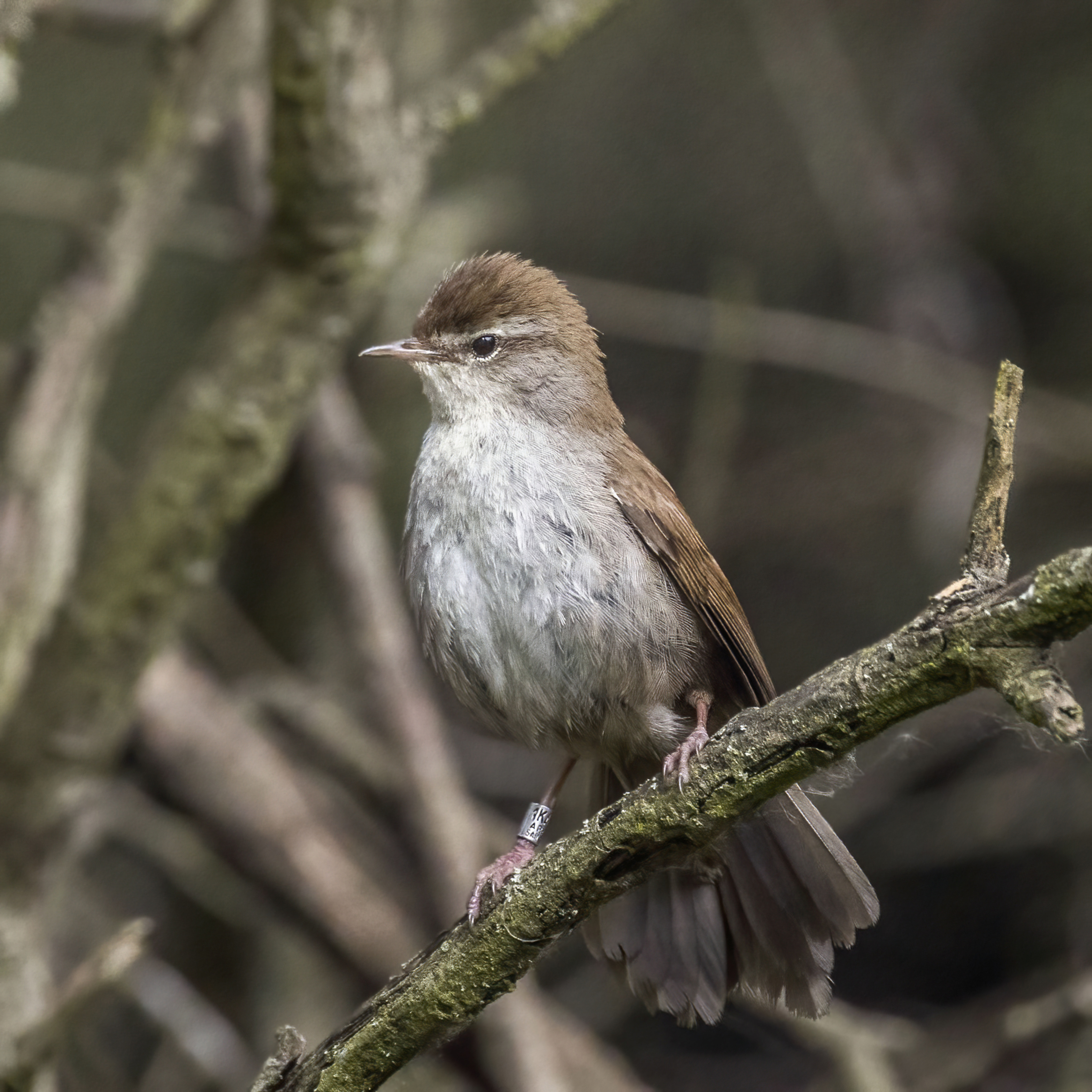
Cetti's warbler, Huelva

== Long-tailed tits ==
Order: Passeriformes Family: Aegithalidae

Long-tailed tits are a group of small passerine birds with medium to long tails. They make woven bag nests in trees. Most eat a mixed diet which includes insects.

- Long-tailed tit (mito común), Aegithalos caudatus
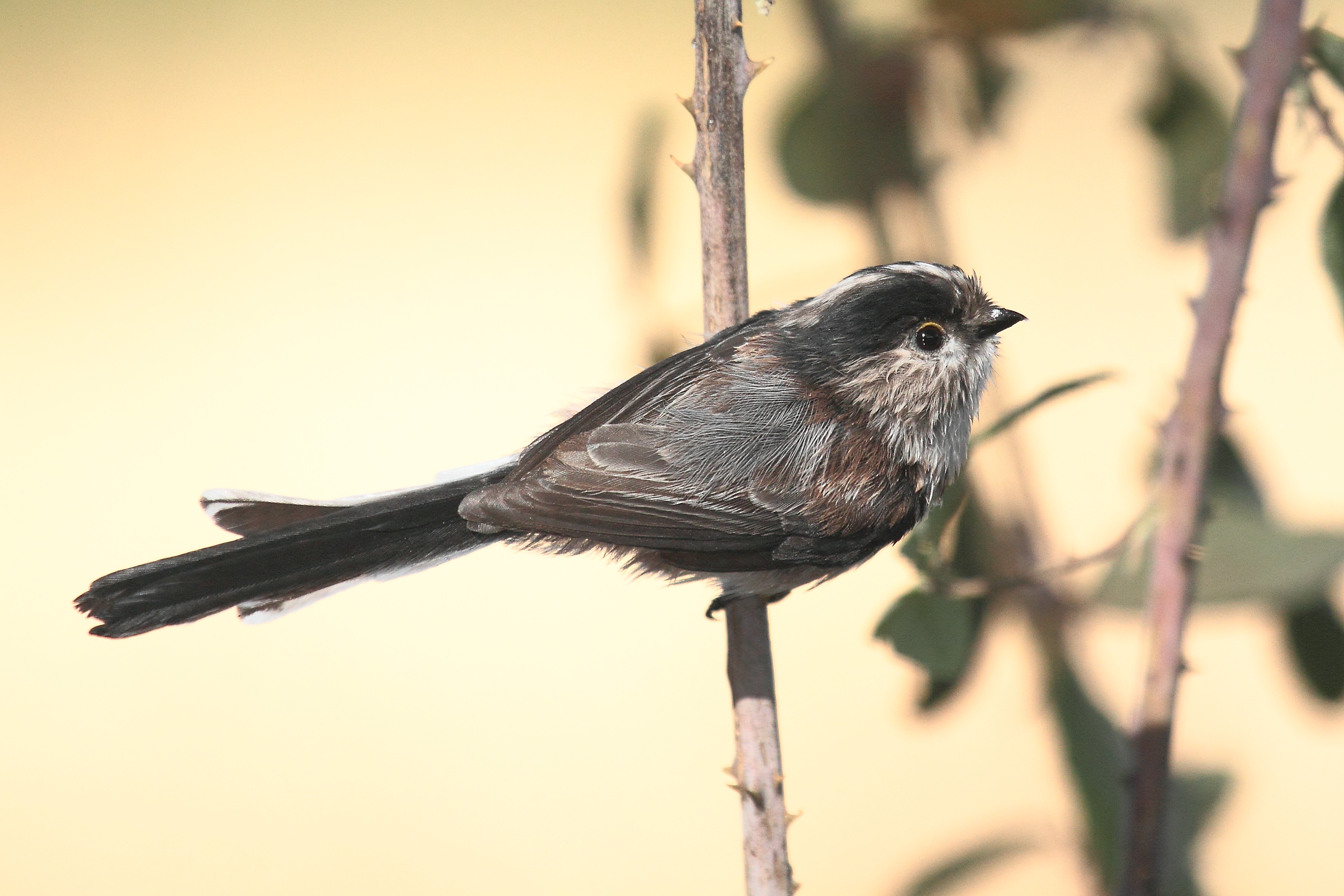
Long-tailed tit A. c. irbii, Jerez de Los Caballeros, Extremadura

== Leaf warblers ==
Order: Passeriformes Family: Phylloscopidae

Leaf warblers are a family of small insectivorous birds found mostly in Eurasia and ranging into Wallacea and Africa. The species are of various sizes, often green-plumaged above and yellow below, or more subdued with greyish-green to greyish-brown colours.

- Wood warbler (mosquitero silbador), Phylloscopus sibilatrix
- Western Bonelli's warbler (mosquitero papialbo), Phylloscopus bonelli
- Hume's warbler (mosquitero de Hume), Phylloscopus humei (R)
- Yellow-browed warbler (mosquitero bilistado), Phylloscopus inornatus
- Pallas's leaf warbler (mosquitero de Pallas), Phylloscopus proregulus (R)
- Radde's warbler (mosquitero de Schwarz), Phylloscopus schwarzi (R)
- Dusky warbler (mosquitero sombrío), Phylloscopus fuscatus (R)
- Willow warbler (mosquitero musical), Phylloscopus trochilus
- Canary Islands chiffchaff (mosquitero canario), Phylloscopus canariensis (E – Canary Islands)
- Common chiffchaff (mosquitero común), Phylloscopus collybita
- Iberian chiffchaff (mosquitero ibérico), Phylloscopus brehmii
- Greenish warbler (mosquitero verdoso), Phylloscopus trochiloides (R)
- Arctic warbler (mosquitero boreal), Phylloscopus borealis (R)
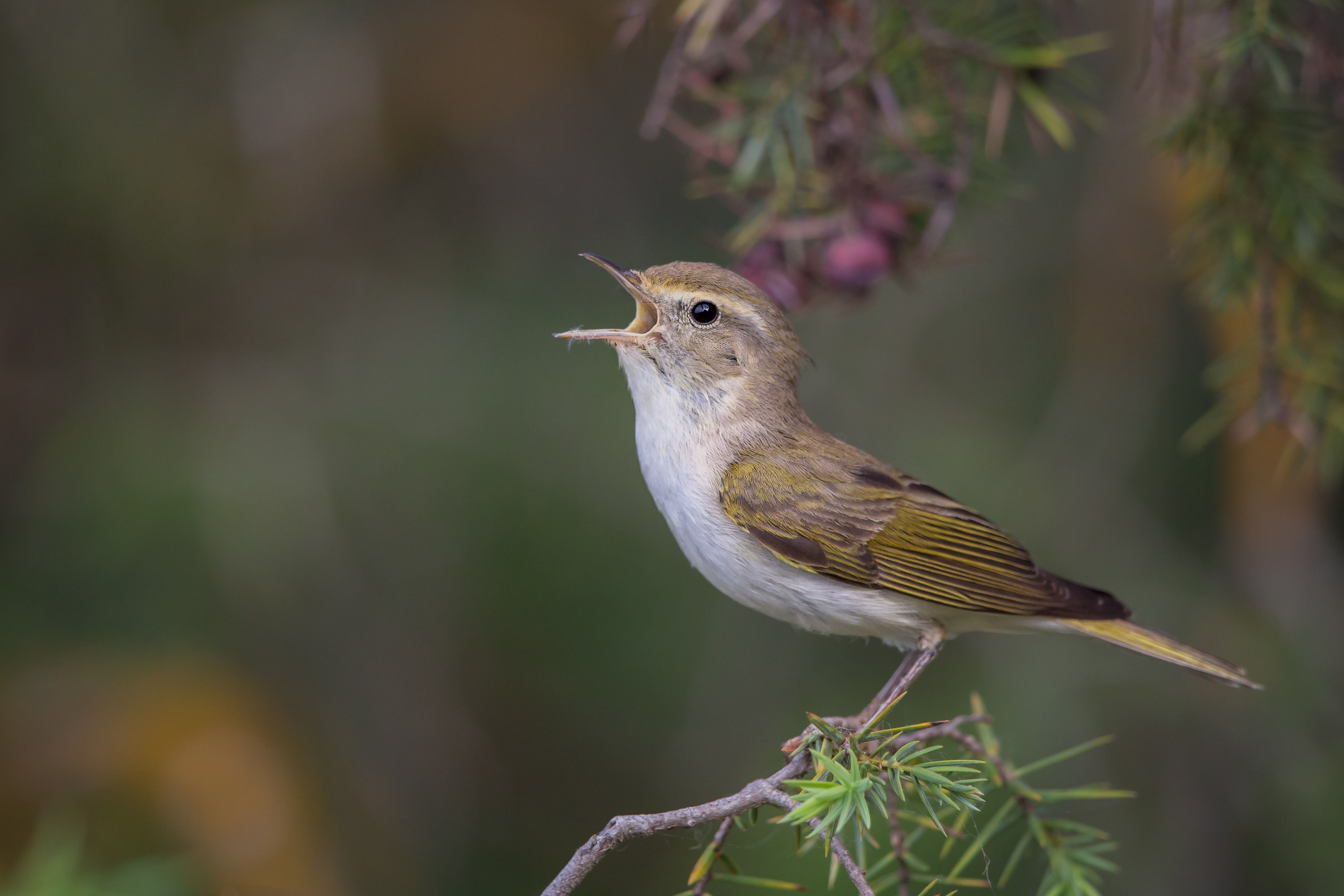
Western Bonelli's warbler, Aragon

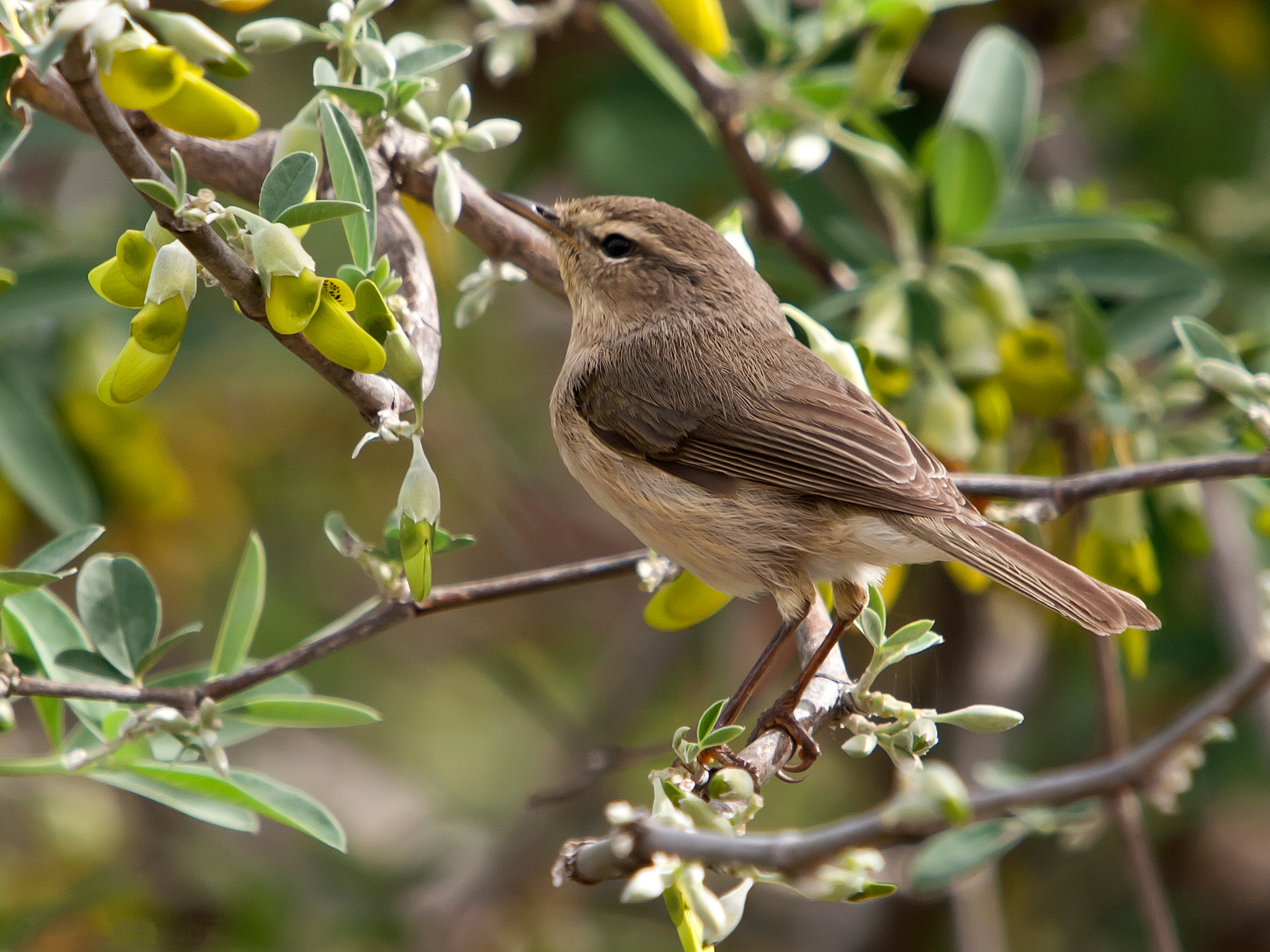
Canary Islands chiffchaff, Dragonal, Gran Canaria

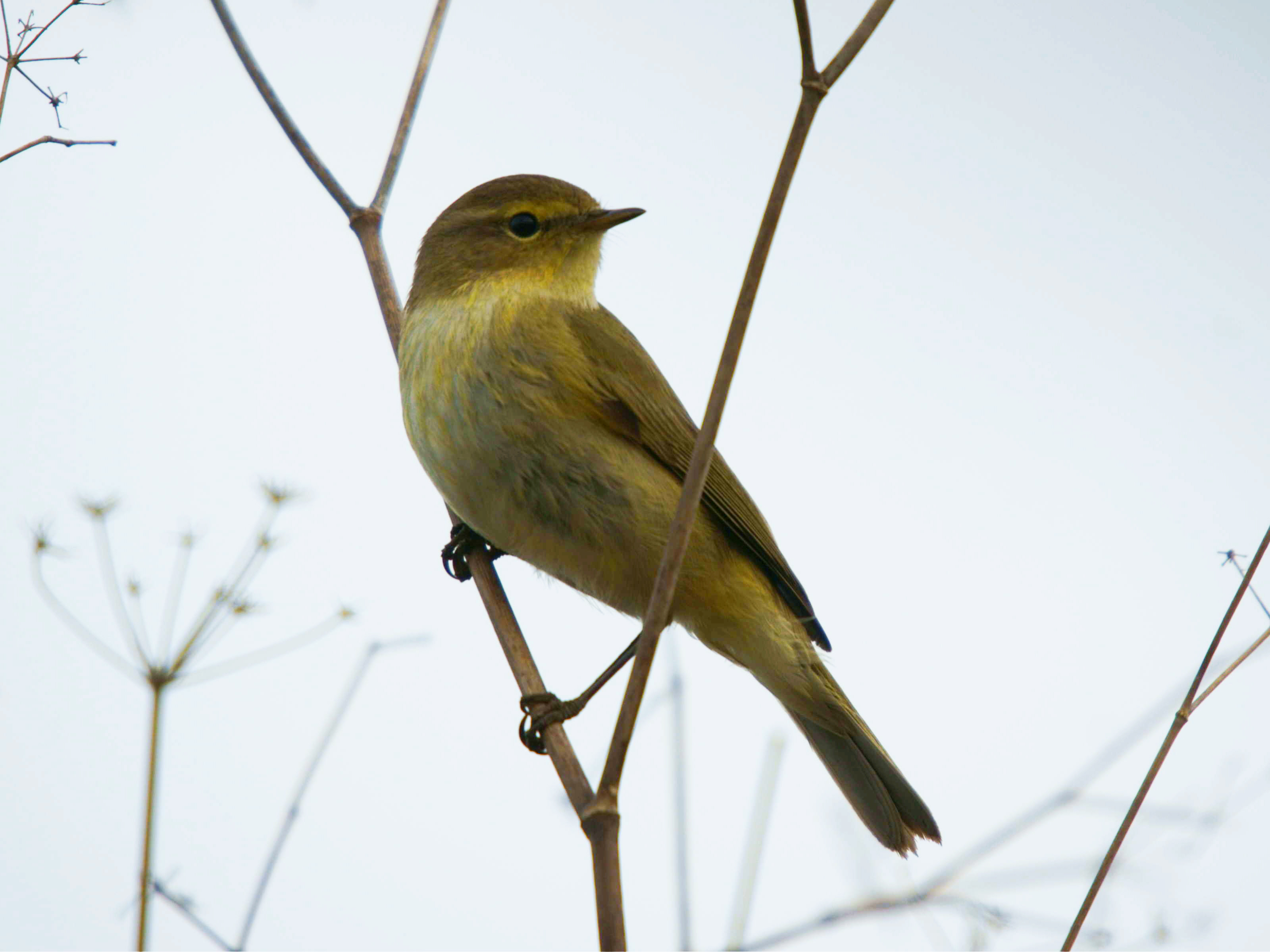
Iberian chiffchaff, Viladecans, Catalonia

== Reed warblers and allies ==
Order: Passeriformes Family: Acrocephalidae

The members of this family are rather plain olivaceous brown above with much yellow to beige below. They are usually found in open woodland, reedbeds, or tall grass. The family occurs mostly in southern to western Eurasia and surroundings, but it also ranges far into the Pacific, with some species in Africa.

- Great reed warbler (carricero tordal), Acrocephalus arundinaceus
- Moustached warbler (carricerín real), Acrocephalus melanopogon
- Aquatic warbler (carricerín cejudo), Acrocephalus paludicola
- Sedge warbler (carricerín común), Acrocephalus schoenobaenus
- Paddyfield warbler (carricero agrícola), Acrocephalus agricola (R)
- Blyth's reed warbler (carricero de Blyth), Acrocephalus dumetorum (R)
- Common reed warbler (carricero común), Acrocephalus scirpaceus
- Marsh warbler (carricero políglota), Acrocephalus palustris (R)
- Booted warbler (zarcero escita), Iduna caligata (R)
- Eastern olivaceous warbler (zarcero pálido), Iduna pallida (R)
- Western olivaceous warbler (zarcero bereber), Iduna opaca
- Melodious warbler (zarcero políglota), Hippolais polyglotta
- Icterine warbler (zarcero icterino), Hippolais icterina
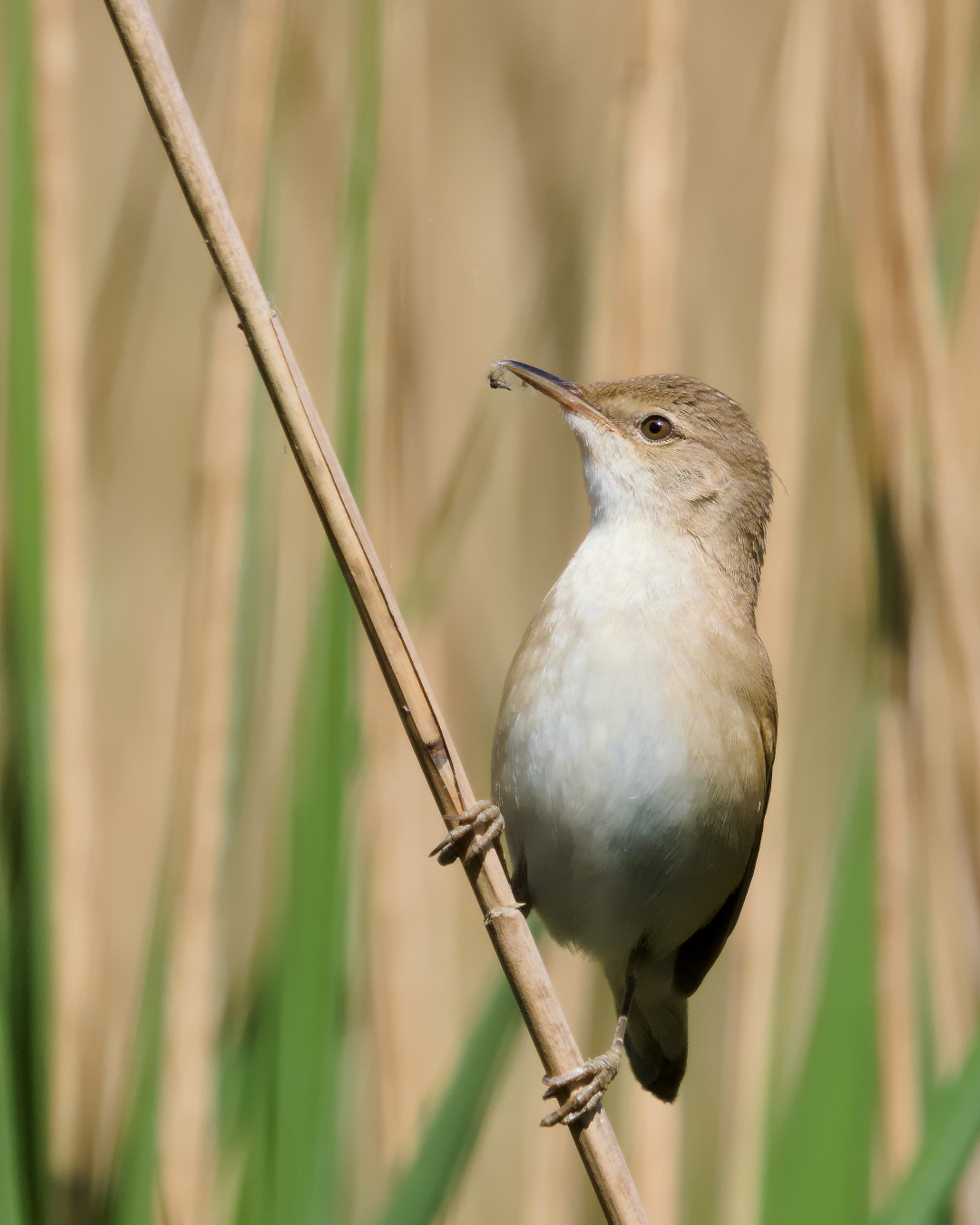
Common reed warbler, Spain

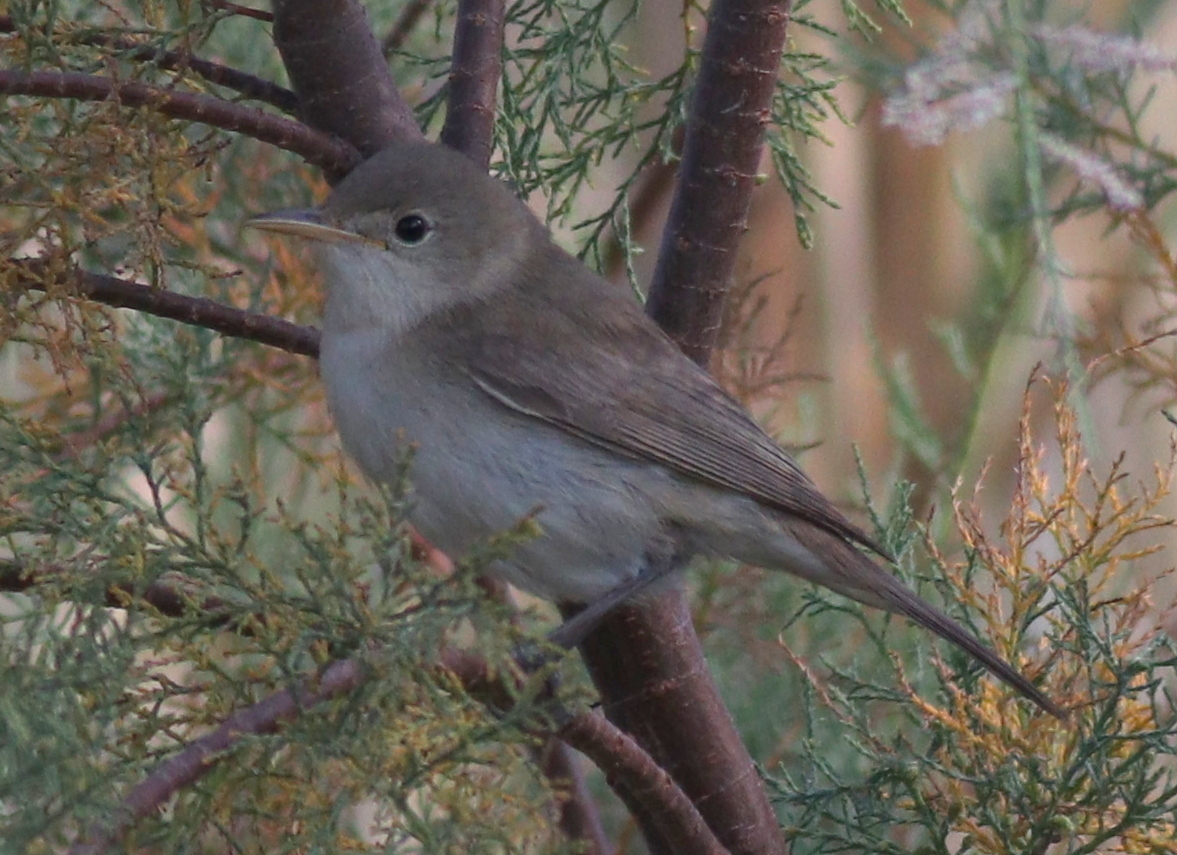
Western olivaceous warbler, Almería

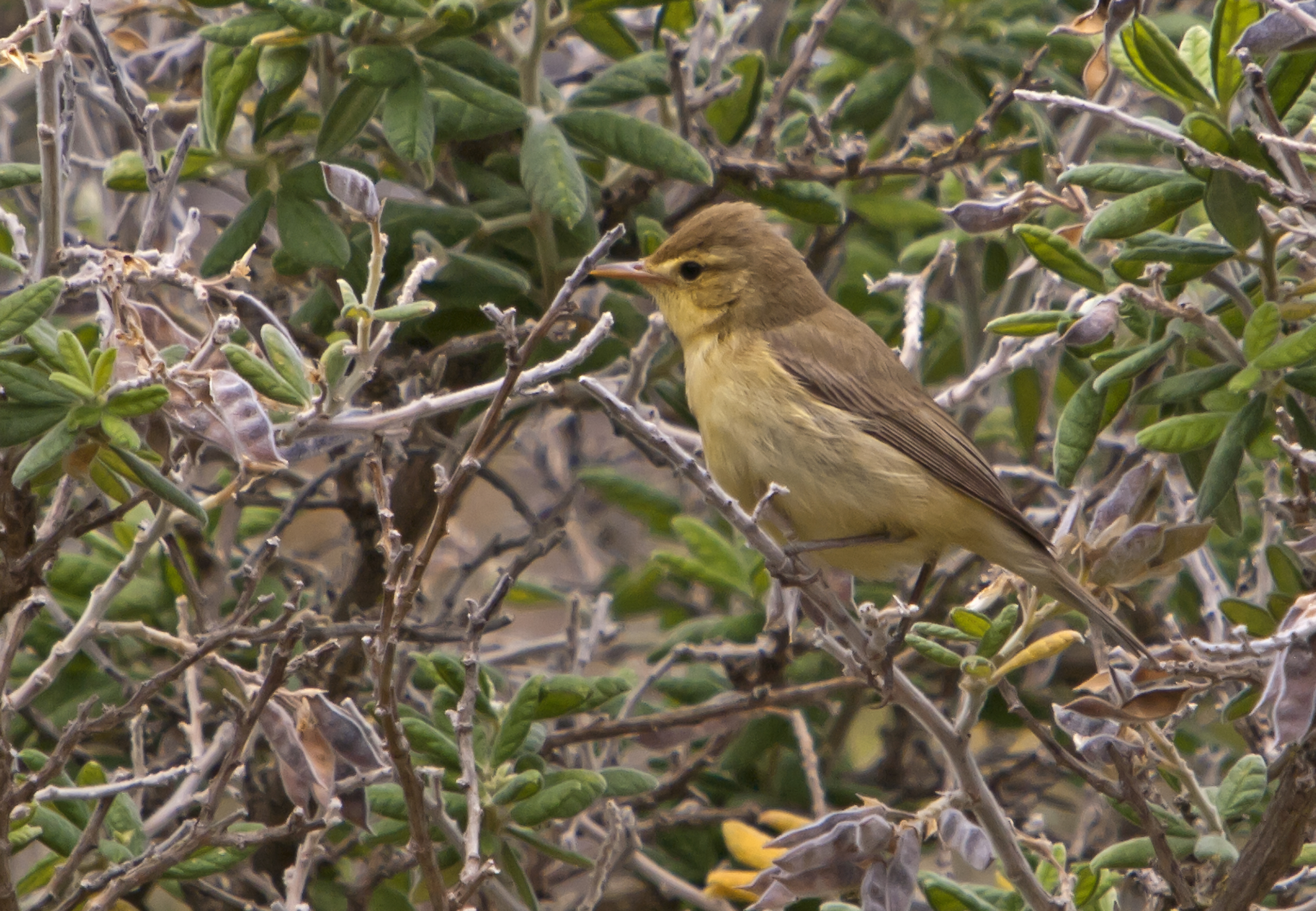
Melodious warbler, Las Palmas, Gran Canaria

== Grassbirds and allies ==
Order: Passeriformes Family: Locustellidae

Locustellidae are a family of small insectivorous songbirds found mainly in Eurasia, Africa, and the Australian region. They are smallish birds with tails that are usually long and pointed, and tend to be drab brownish or buffy all over.

- Savi's warbler (buscarla unicolor), Locustella luscinioides
- Common grasshopper warbler (buscarla pintoja), Locustella naevia

== Cisticolas and allies ==
Order: Passeriformes Family: Cisticolidae

The Cisticolidae are warblers found mainly in warmer regions of the Old World. They are generally very small birds of drab brown or grey appearance found in open country such as grassland or scrub

- Zitting cisticola (cistícola buitrón), Cisticola juncidis
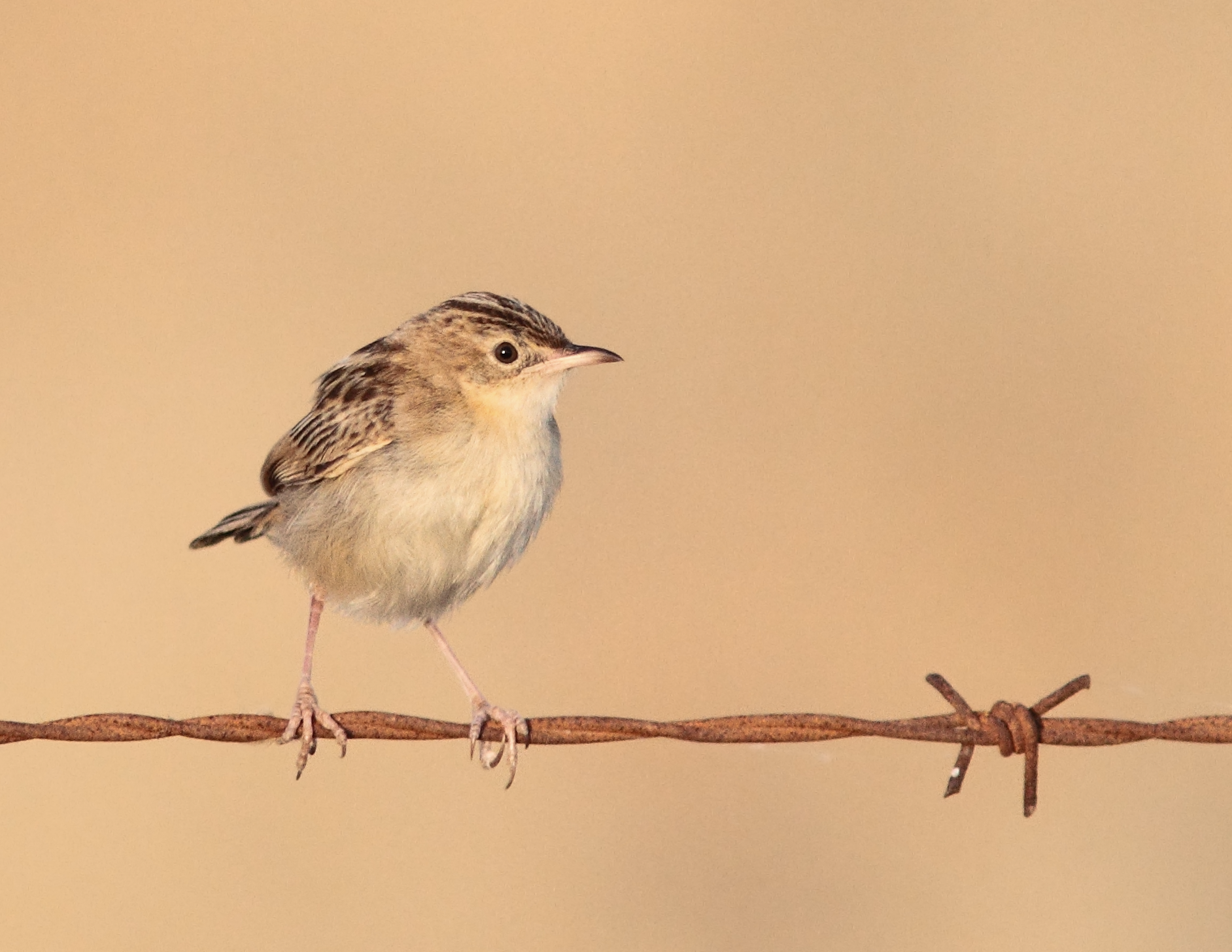
Zitting cisticola, Extremadura

== Sylviid warblers and allies ==
Order: Passeriformes Family: Sylviidae

The family Sylviidae is a group of small insectivorous passerine birds. They mainly occur as breeding species in Europe, Asia and Africa. Some are of generally undistinguished appearance, but many have distinctive head patterns, and musical songs.

- Eurasian blackcap (curruca capirotada), Sylvia atricapilla
- Garden warbler (curruca mosquitera), Sylvia borin
- Barred warbler (curruca gavilana), Curruca nisoria (R)
- Lesser whitethroat (curruca zarcerilla), Curruca curruca (R)
- Western Orphean warbler (curruca mirlona occidental), Curruca hortensis
- African desert warbler (curruca sahariana), Curruca nana (R)
- Asian desert warbler (curruca enana), Curruca nana (R)
- Tristram's warbler (curruca del Atlas), Curruca deserticola (R)
- Rüppell's warbler (curruca de Rüppell), Curruca ruppeli (R)
- Sardinian warbler (curruca cabecinegra), Curruca melanocephala
- Western subalpine warbler (curruca carrasqueña occidental), Curruca iberiae
- Moltoni's warbler (curruca subalpina), Curruca subalpina
- Eastern subalpine warbler (curruca carrasqueña oriental), Curruca cantillans (R)
- Common whitethroat (curruca zarcera), Curruca communis
- Spectacled warbler (curruca tomillera), Curruca conspicillata
- Marmora's warbler (curruca sarda), Curruca sarda (R)
- Dartford warbler (curruca rabilarga), Curruca undata near-threatened
- Balearic warbler (curruca balear), Curruca balearica (E – Balearic Islands)
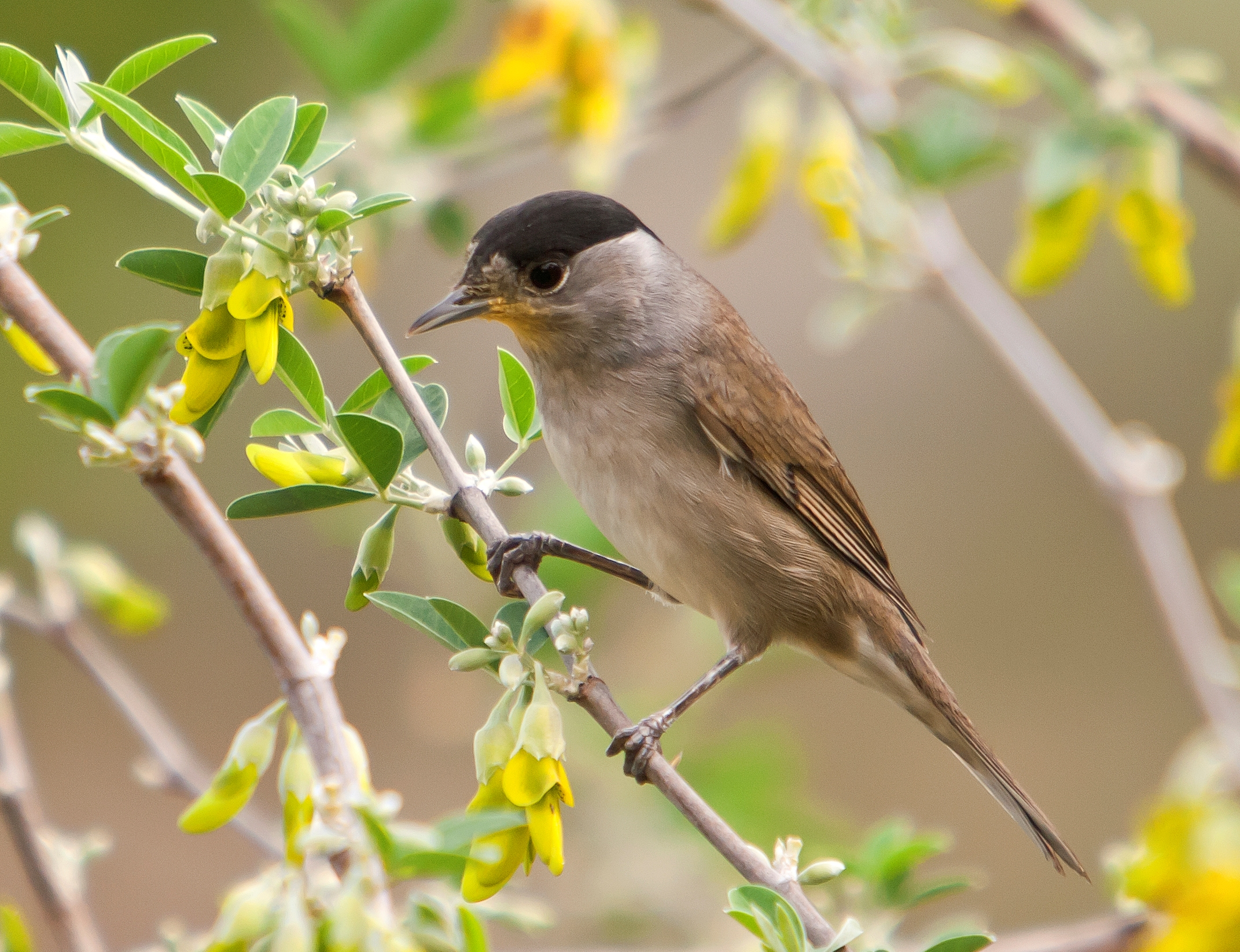
Eurasian blackcap, Canary Islands

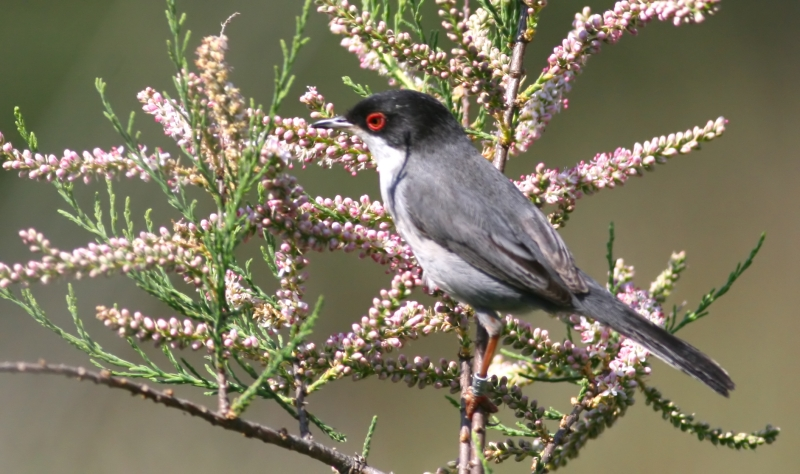
Sardinian warbler, Mallorca

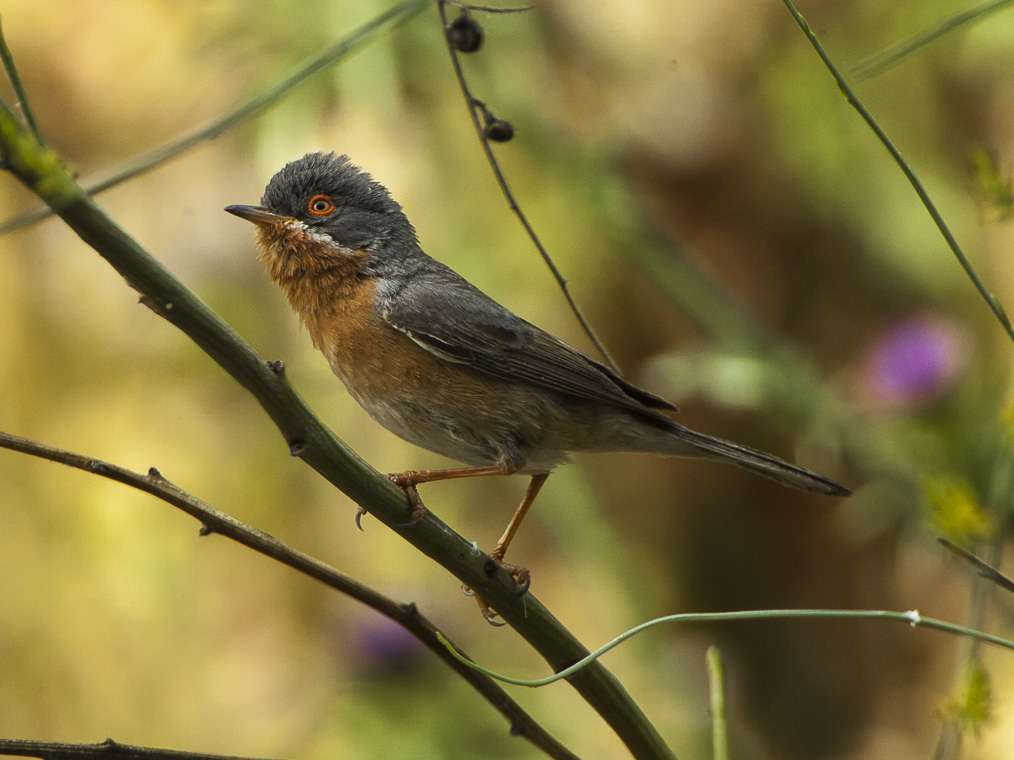
Western subalpine warbler, Monfragüe

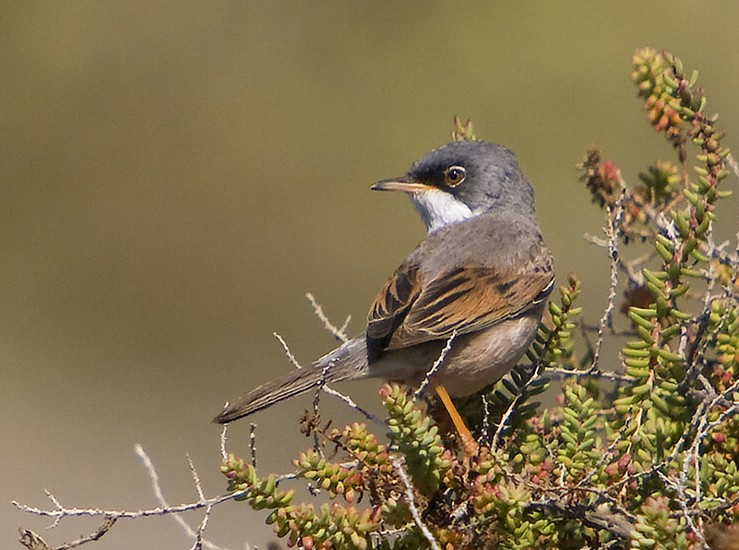
Spectacled warbler, Gran Canaria

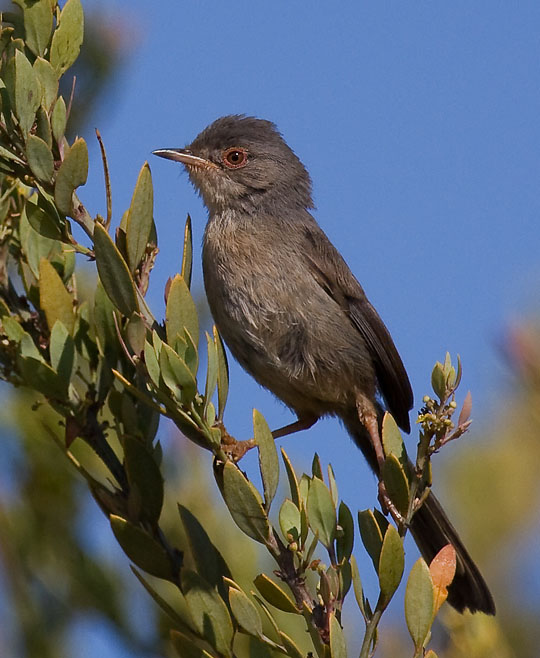
Dartford warbler, Andalusia

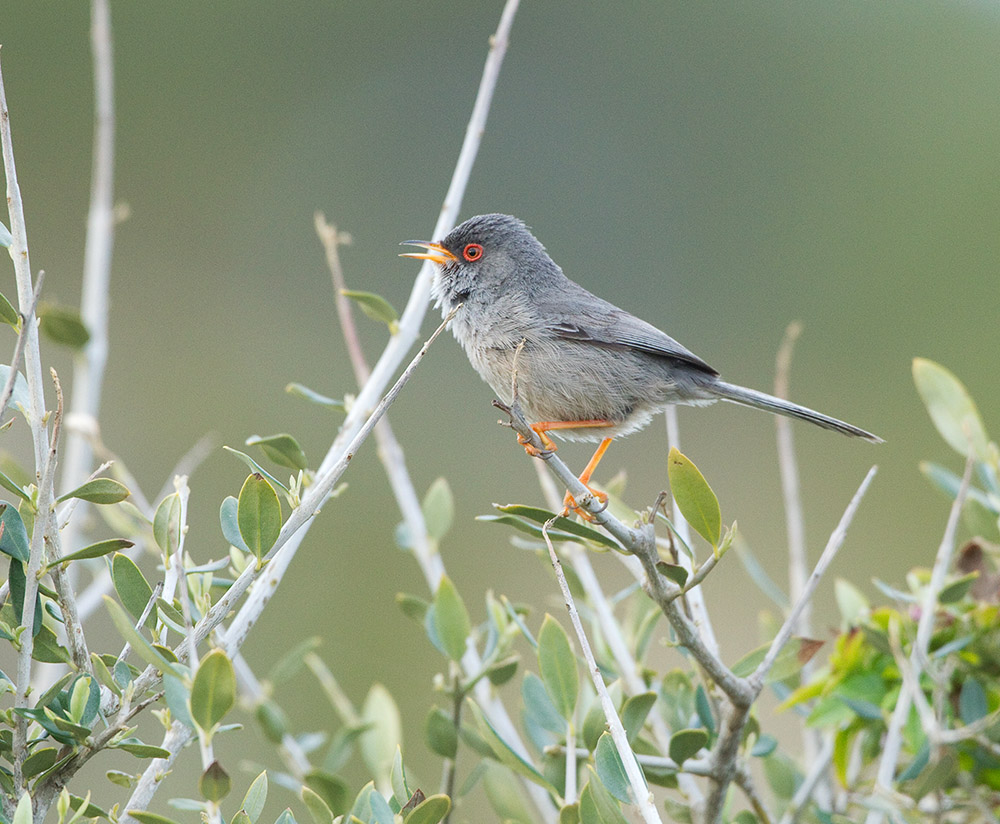
Balearic warbler, Spain

== Laughingthrushes and allies ==
Order: Passeriformes Family: Leiothrichidae

The laughingthrushes are somewhat diverse in size and colour, but are characterised by soft fluffy plumage.

- Red-billed leiothrix (leiótrix piquirrojo), Leiothrix lutea (C)

== Crests and kinglets ==
Order: Passeriformes Family: Regulidae

The crests, also called kinglets in North America, are a small group of birds formerly often included in the Old World warblers, but now given family status because they are genetically distant.

- Common firecrest (reyezuelo listado), Regulus ignicapilla
- Goldcrest (reyezuelo sencillo), Regulus regulus
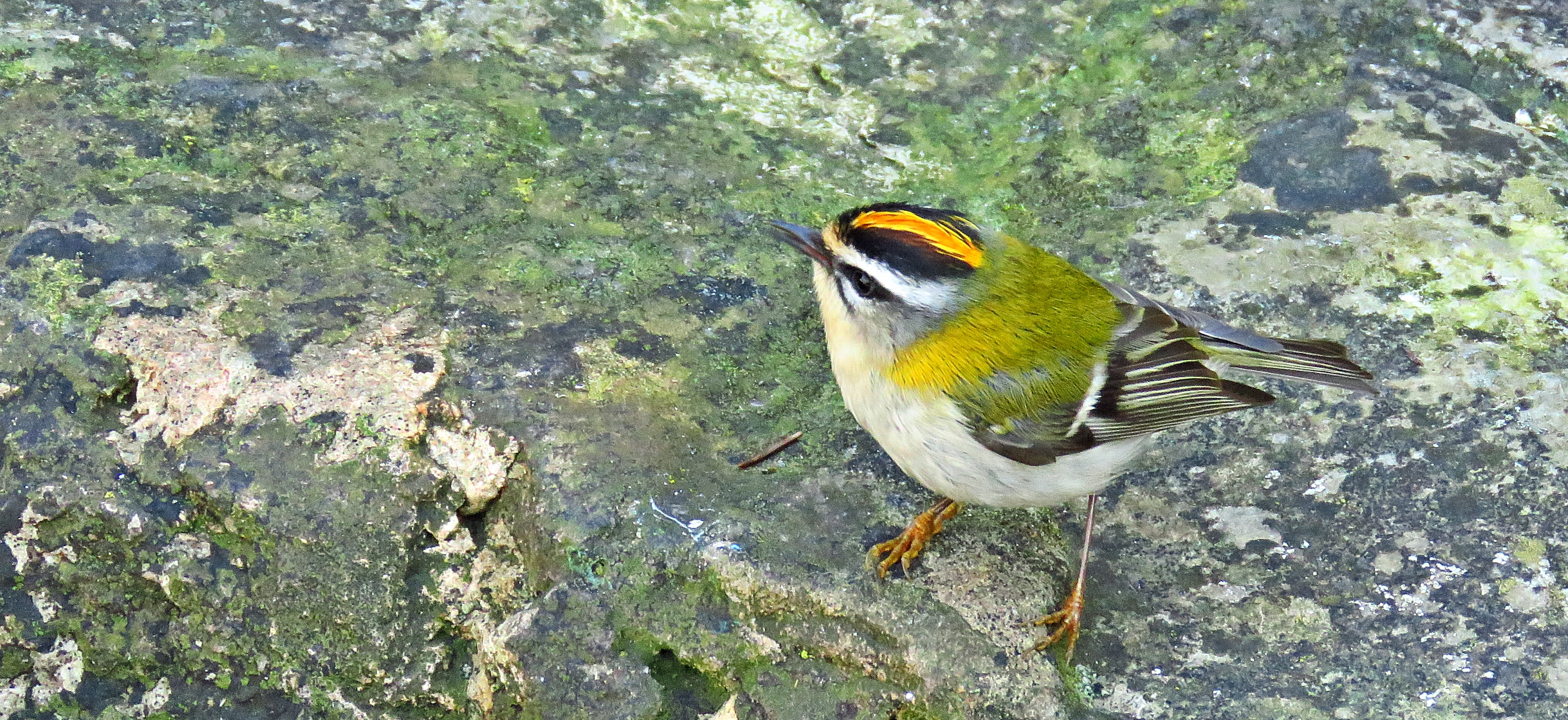
Common firecrest, Spain

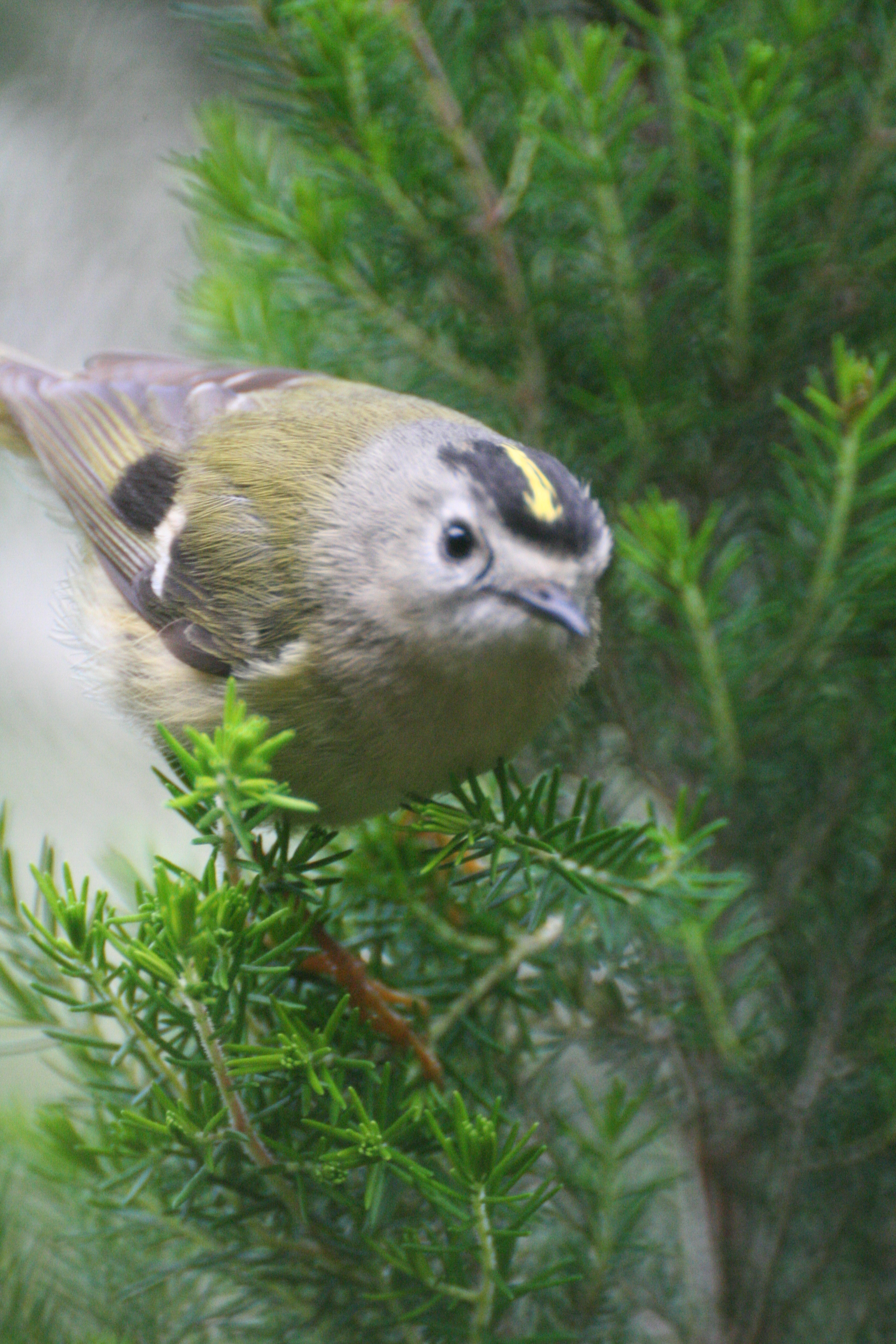
Tenerife goldcrest Regulus regulus teneriffae, Tenerife

== Wrens ==
Order: Passeriformes Family: Troglodytidae

The wrens are mainly small and inconspicuous except for their loud songs. These birds have short wings and thin down-turned bills. Several species often hold their tails upright. All are insectivorous.

- Eurasian wren (chochín paleártico), Troglodytes troglodytes

== Nuthatches ==
Order: Passeriformes Family: Sittidae

Nuthatches are small woodland birds. They have the unusual ability to climb down trees head first, unlike other birds which can only go upwards. Nuthatches have big heads, short tails and powerful bills and feet.

- Eurasian nuthatch (trepador azul), Sitta europaea

== Wallcreeper ==
Order: Passeriformes Family: Tichodromidae

The wallcreeper is a small bird related to the nuthatch family, which has stunning crimson, grey and black plumage.

- Wallcreeper (treparriscos), Tichodroma muraria
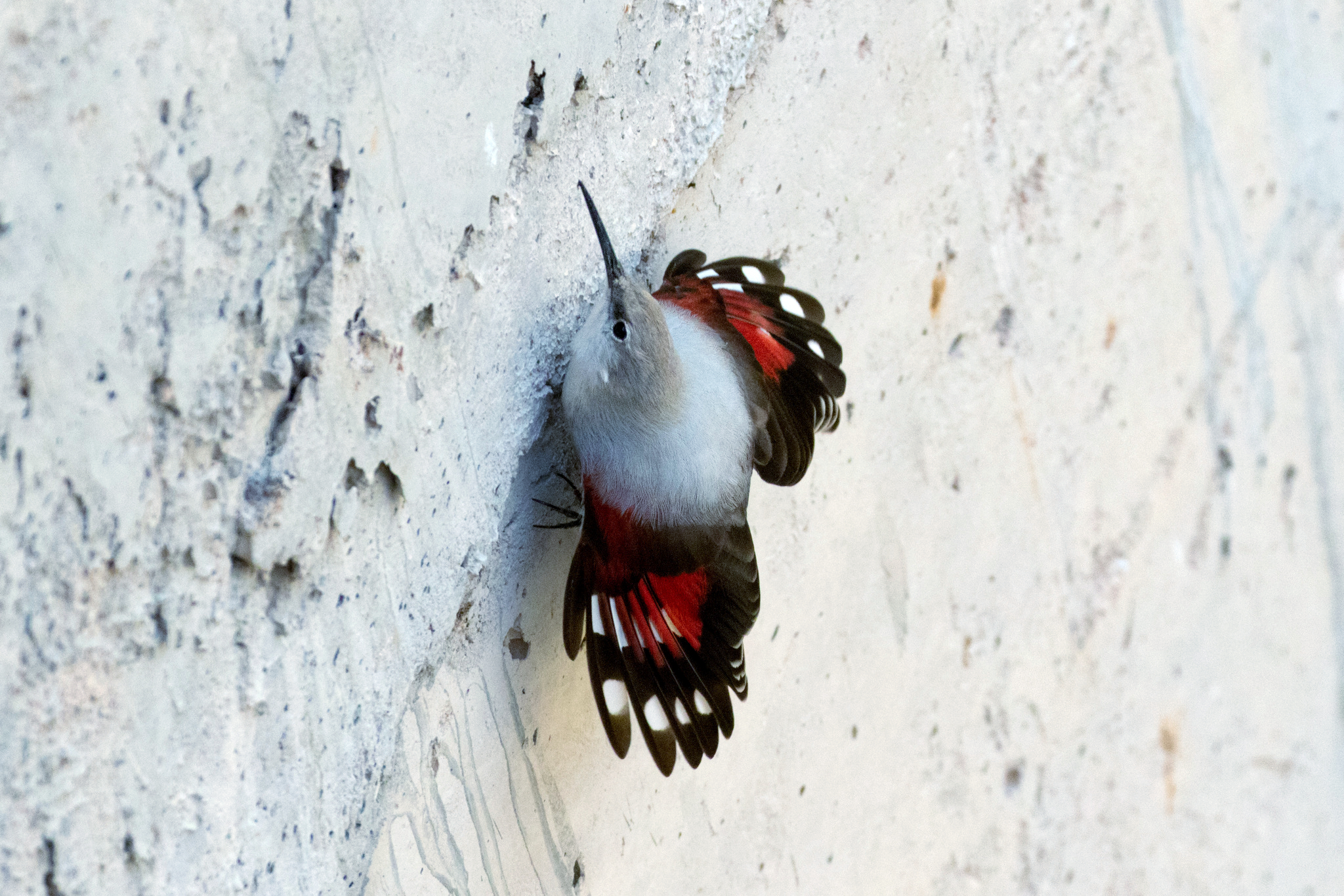
Wallcreeper, Vadiello Reservoir, Huesca

== Treecreepers ==
Order: Passeriformes Family: Certhiidae

Treecreepers are small woodland birds, brown above and white below. They have thin pointed down-curved bills, which they use to extricate insects from bark. They have stiff tail feathers, like woodpeckers, which they use to support themselves on vertical trees.

- Eurasian treecreeper (agateador euroasiático), Certhia familiaris
- Short-toed treecreeper (agateador europeo), Certhia brachydactyla
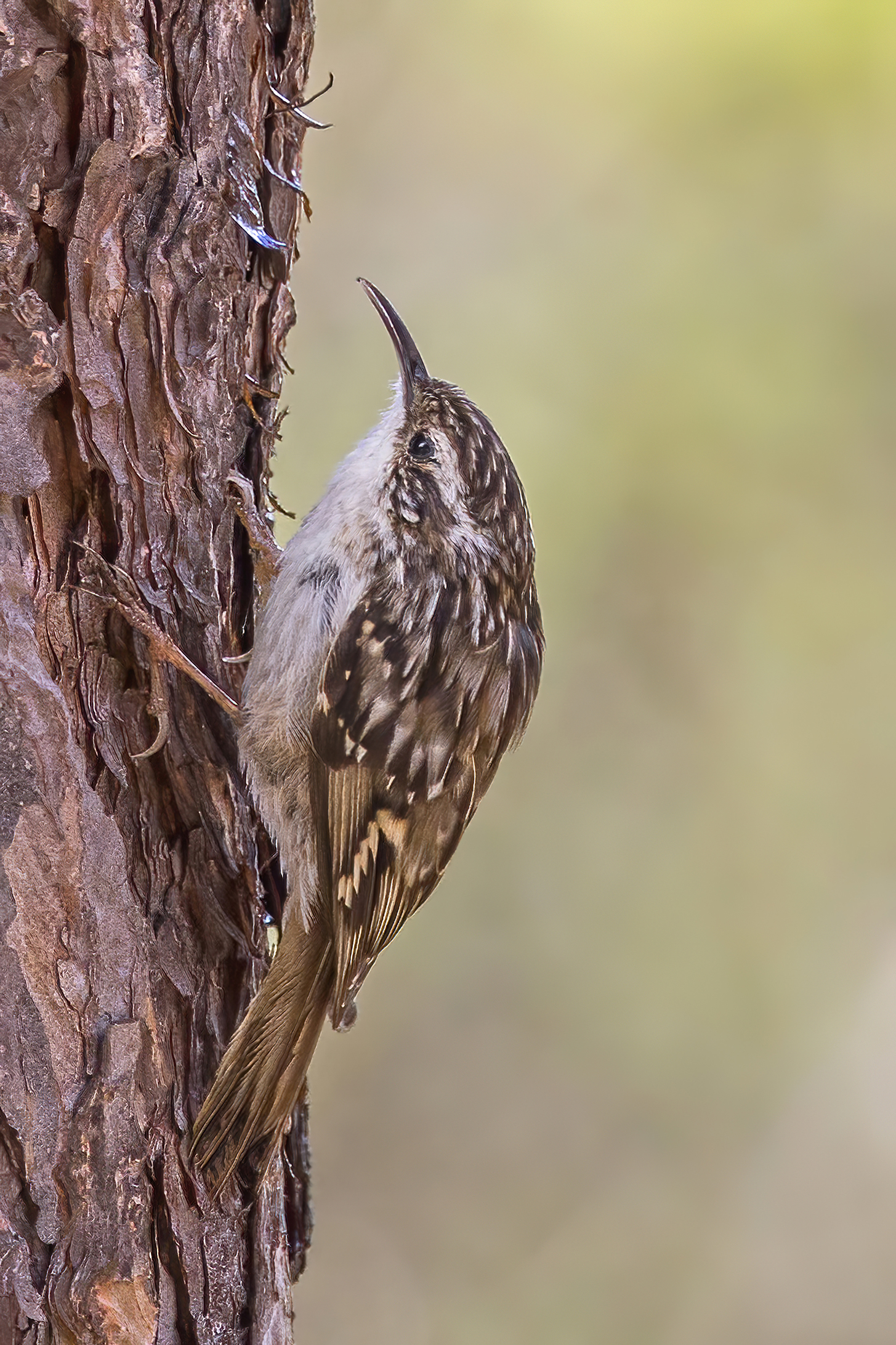
Short-toed treecreeper, Almonte

== Mockingbirds and thrashers ==
Order: Passeriformes Family: Mimidae

The mimids are a family of New World passerine birds related to starlings; a few species have been recorded as transatlantic vagrants in Europe. The species tend towards dull greys and browns in their appearance.

- Grey catbird (pájaro gato gris), Dumetella carolinensis (R)

== Starlings ==
Order: Passeriformes Family: Sturnidae

Starlings are small to medium-sized passerine birds. Their flight is strong and direct and they are very gregarious. Their preferred habitat is fairly open country. They eat insects and fruit. Plumage is typically dark with strong iridescence.

- Rosy starling (estornino rosado), Pastor roseus (R)
- Common starling (estornino pinto), Sturnus vulgaris
- Spotless starling (estornino negro), Sturnus unicolor
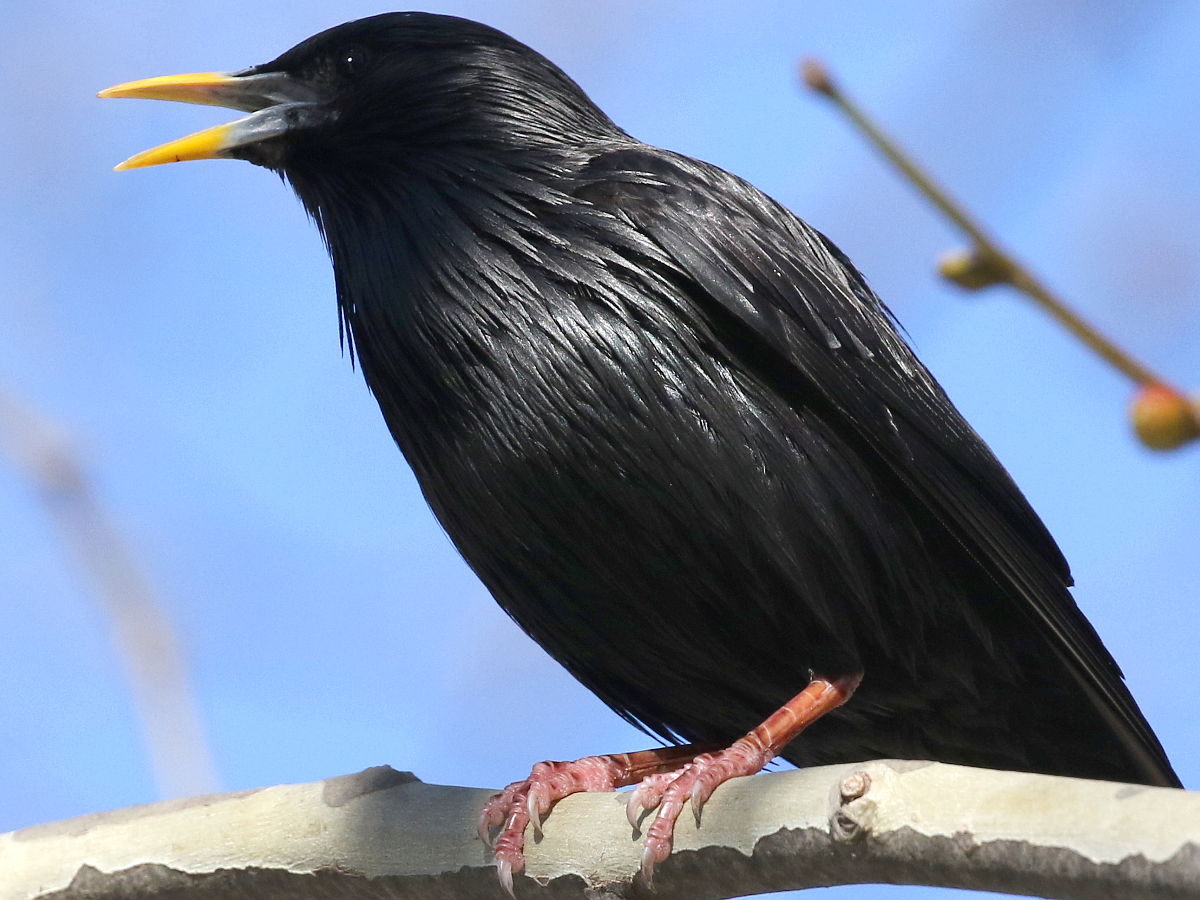
Spotless starling, Seville

== Thrushes and allies ==
Order: Passeriformes Family: Turdidae

The thrushes are a group of passerine birds with a global distribution. They are plump, soft plumaged, medium-sized insectivores and frugivores, often feeding on the ground. Many have attractive songs.

- White's thrush (zorzal dorado de Siberia), Zoothera aurea (R)
- Song thrush (zorzal común), Turdus philomelos
- Mistle thrush (zorzal charlo), Turdus viscivorus
- Redwing (zorzal alirrojo), Turdus iliacus
- Common blackbird (mirlo común), Turdus merula
- Eyebrowed thrush (zorzal rojigrís), Turdus obscurus (R)
- Fieldfare (zorzal real), Turdus pilaris
- Ring ouzel (mirlo capiblanco), Turdus torquatus
- Naumann's thrush (zorzal de Naumann), Turdus naumanni (R)
- American robin (zorzal robín), Turdus migratorius (R)
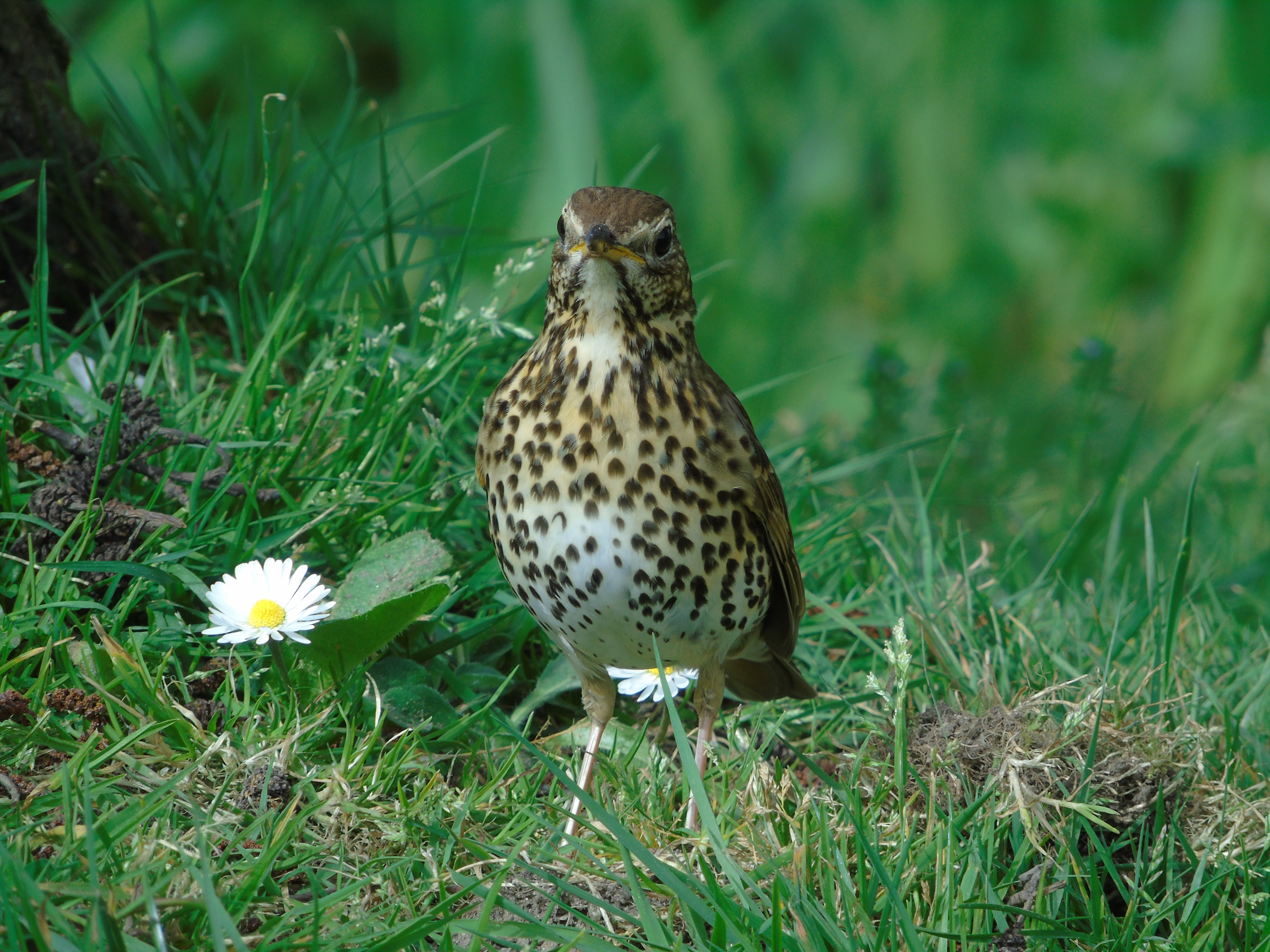
Song thrush, Arteixo, Galicia

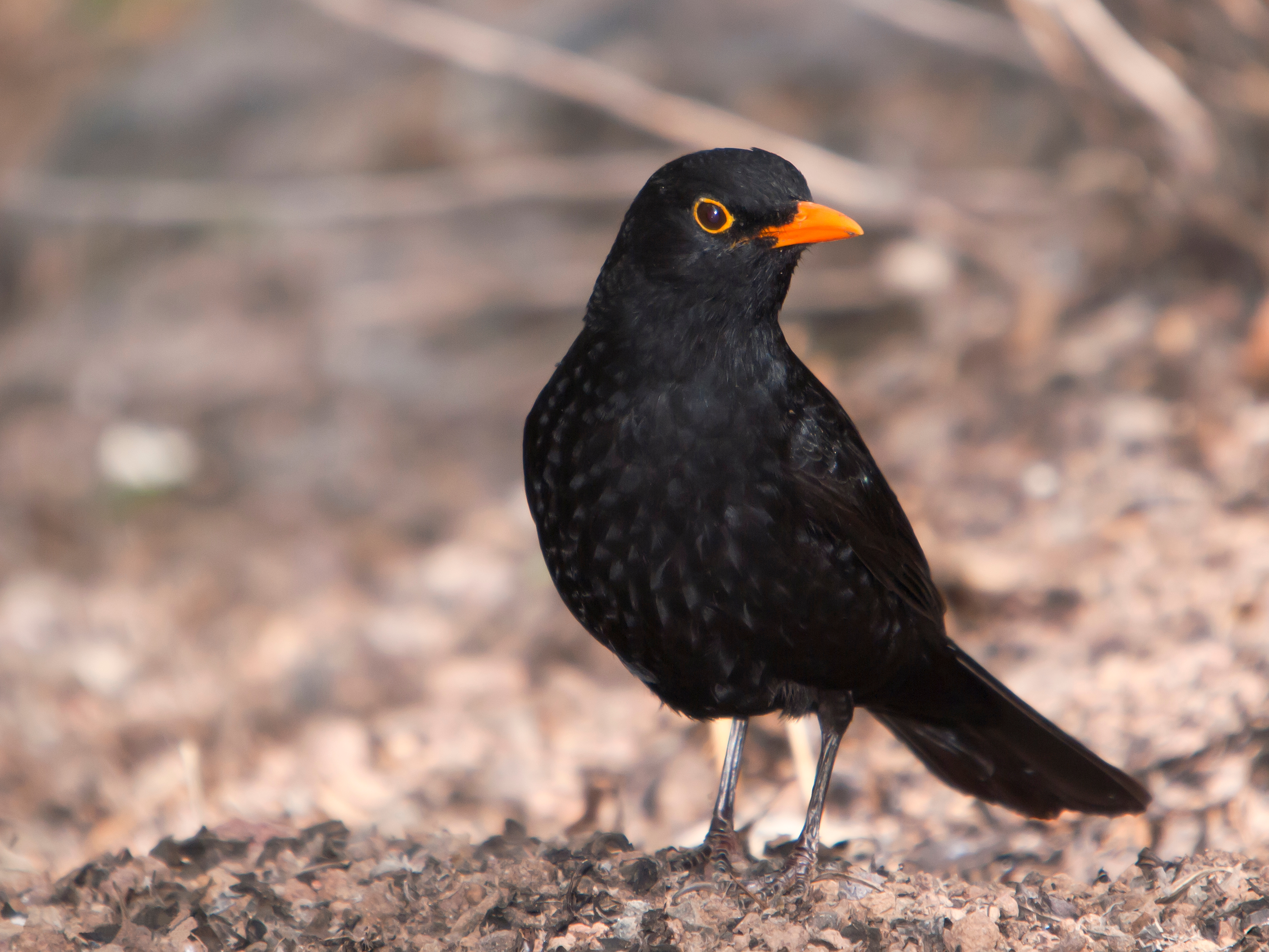
Eurasian blackbird, Gran Canaria

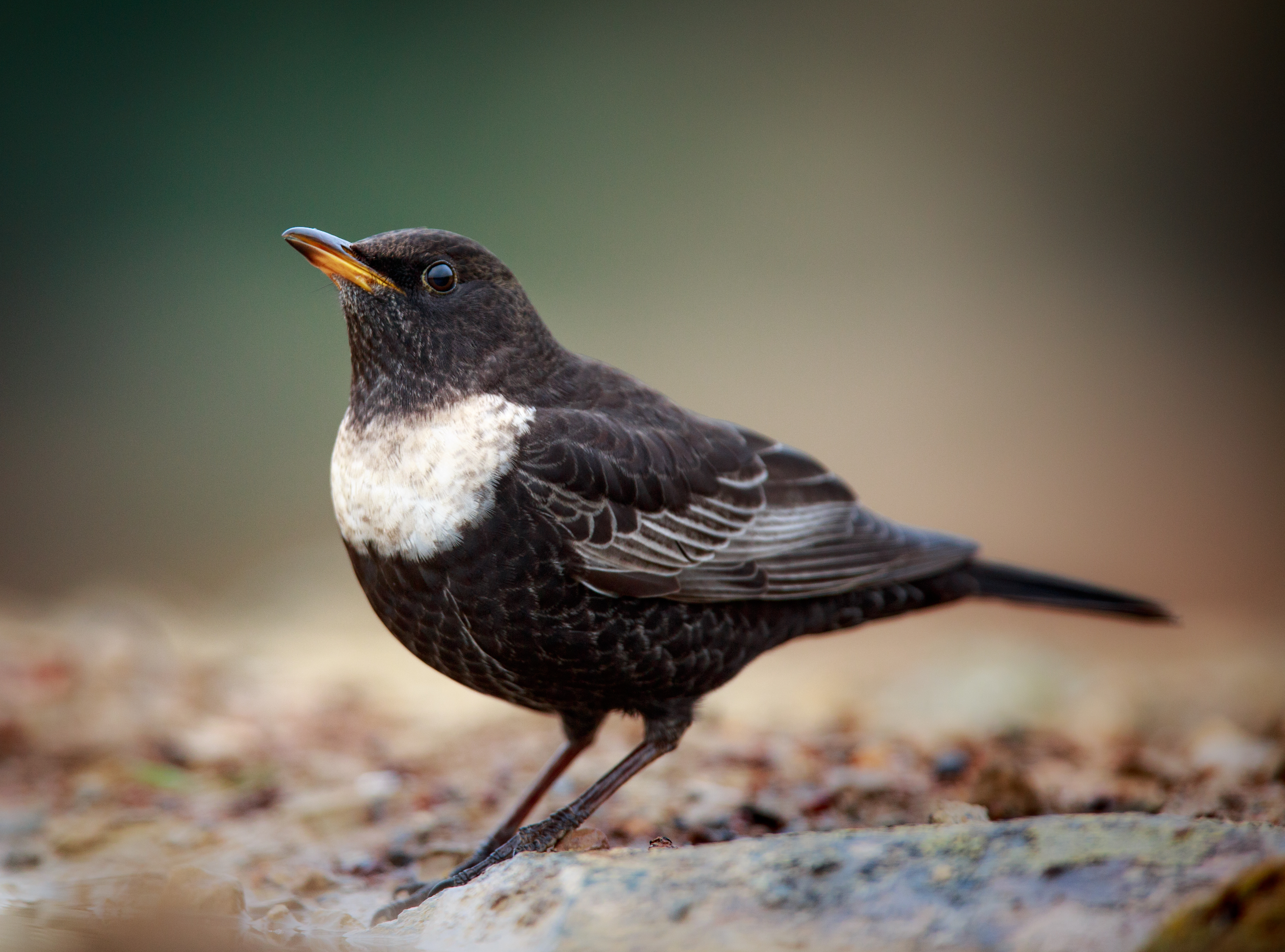
Ring ouzel, Spain

== Old World flycatchers ==
Order: Passeriformes Family: Muscicapidae

Old World flycatchers are a large group of small passerine birds native to the Old World. They are mainly small insectivores. The appearance of these birds is highly varied; some have weak songs but others (notably the nightingales) have among the most complex and varied songs of all birds.

- Rufous-tailed scrub-robin (alzacola rojizo), Cercotrichas galactotes
- Spotted flycatcher (papamoscas gris), Muscicapa striata
- Mediterranean flycatcher (papamoscas mediterráneo), Muscicapa tyrrhenica
- European robin (petirrojo europeo), Erithacus rubecula
- Siberian blue robin (ruiseñor azul), Larvivora cyane (R)
- Bluethroat (ruiseñor pechiazul), Luscinia svecica
- Common nightingale (ruiseñor común), Luscinia megarhynchos
- Red-flanked bluetail (ruiseñor coliazul), Tarsiger cyanurus (R)
- Red-breasted flycatcher (papamoscas papirrojo), Ficedula parva (R)
- Semicollared flycatcher (papamoscas semiacollarado), Ficedula semitorquata (R)
- European pied flycatcher (papamoscas cerrojillo), Ficedula hypoleuca
- Collared flycatcher (papamoscas acollarado), Ficedula albicollis (R)
- Black redstart (colirrojo tizón), Phoenicurus ochruros
- Common redstart (colirrojo real), Phoenicurus phoenicurus
- Moussier's redstart (colirrojo diademado), Phoenicurus moussieri (R except North African enclaves)
- Common rock thrush (roquero rojo), Monticola saxatilis
- Blue rock thrush (roquero solitario), Monticola solitarius
- Whinchat (tarabilla norteña), Saxicola rubetra
- Canary Islands stonechat (tarabilla canaria), Saxicola dacotiae (E – Canary Islands)
- European stonechat (tarabilla europea), Saxicola rubicola
- Siberian stonechat (tarabilla siberiana), Saxicola maurus (R)
- Northern wheatear (collalba gris), Oenanthe oenanthe
- Atlas wheatear (collalba del Atlas), Oenanthe seebohmi (R)
- Isabelline wheatear (collalba isabel), Oenanthe isabellina (R)
- Desert wheatear (collalba desértica), Oenanthe deserti (R)
- Western black-eared wheatear (collalba rubia occidental), Oenanthe hispanica
- Eastern black-eared wheatear (collalba rubia oriental), Oenanthe melanoleuca (R)
- Black wheatear (collalba negra), Oenanthe leucura
- White-crowned wheatear (collalba yebélica), Oenanthe leucopyga (R)
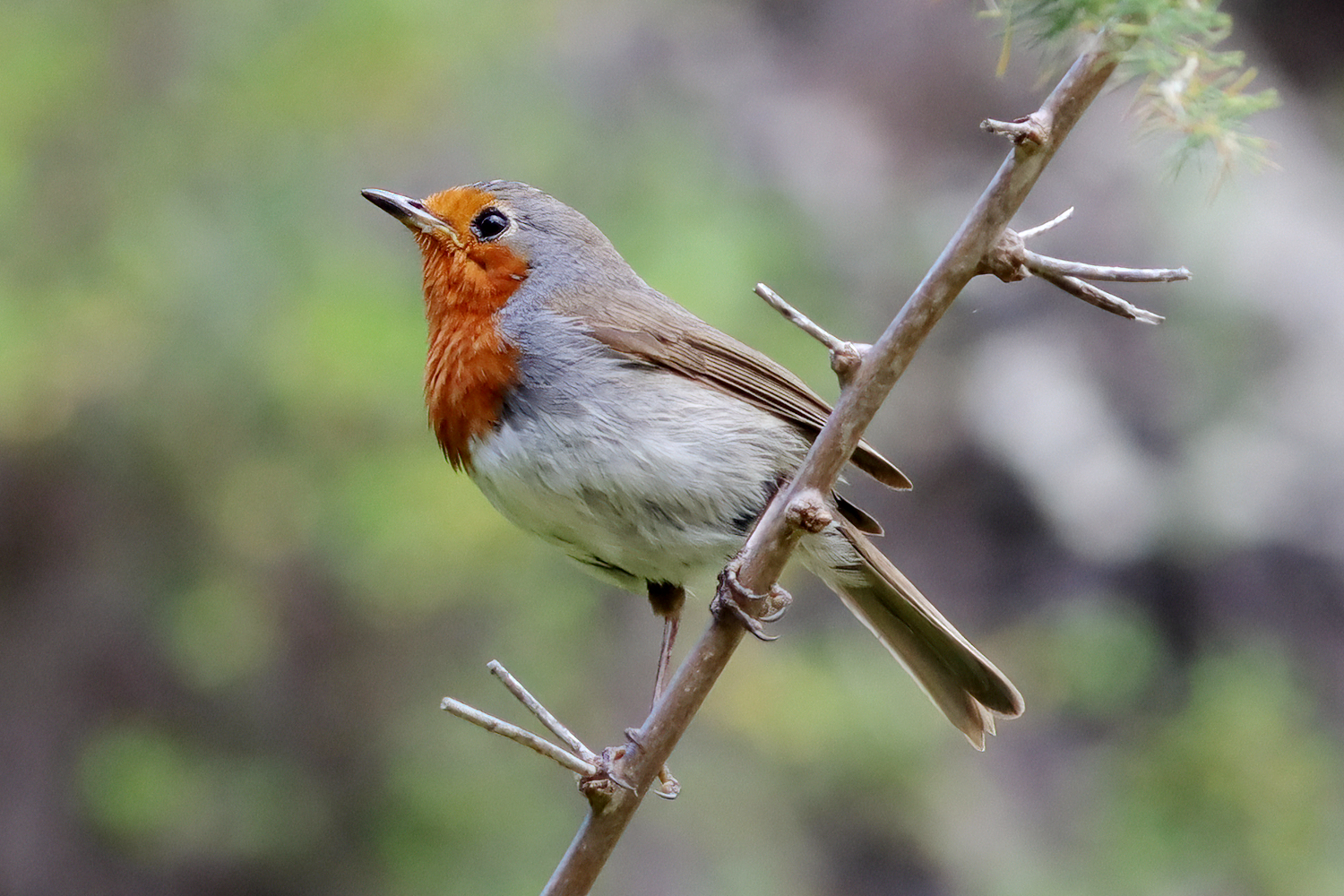
Robin, Tenerife endemic subspecies Erithacus rubecula superbus, Los Silos, Tenerife

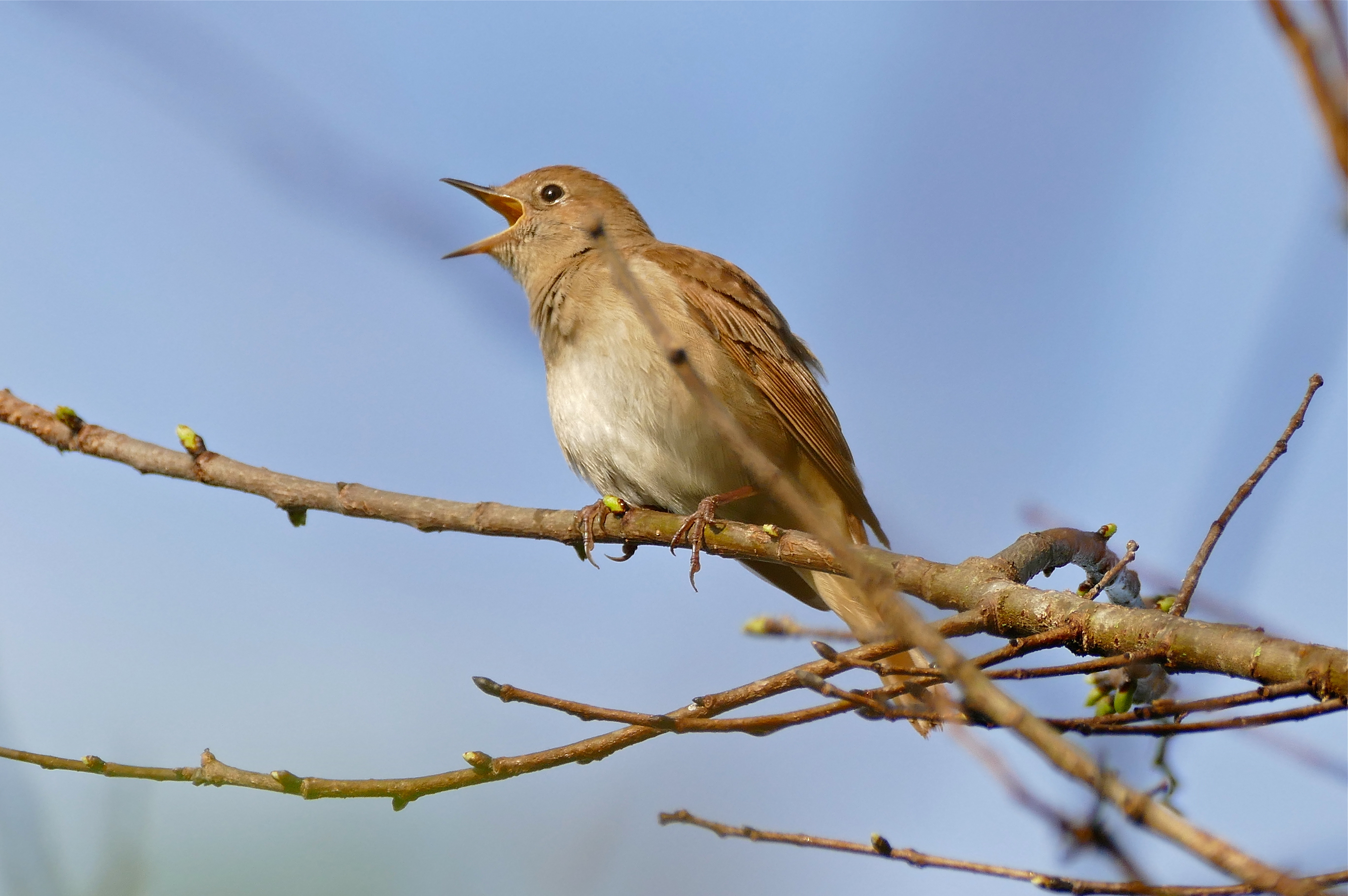
Common nightingale, Los Aiguamolls del' Empordà, Catalunya

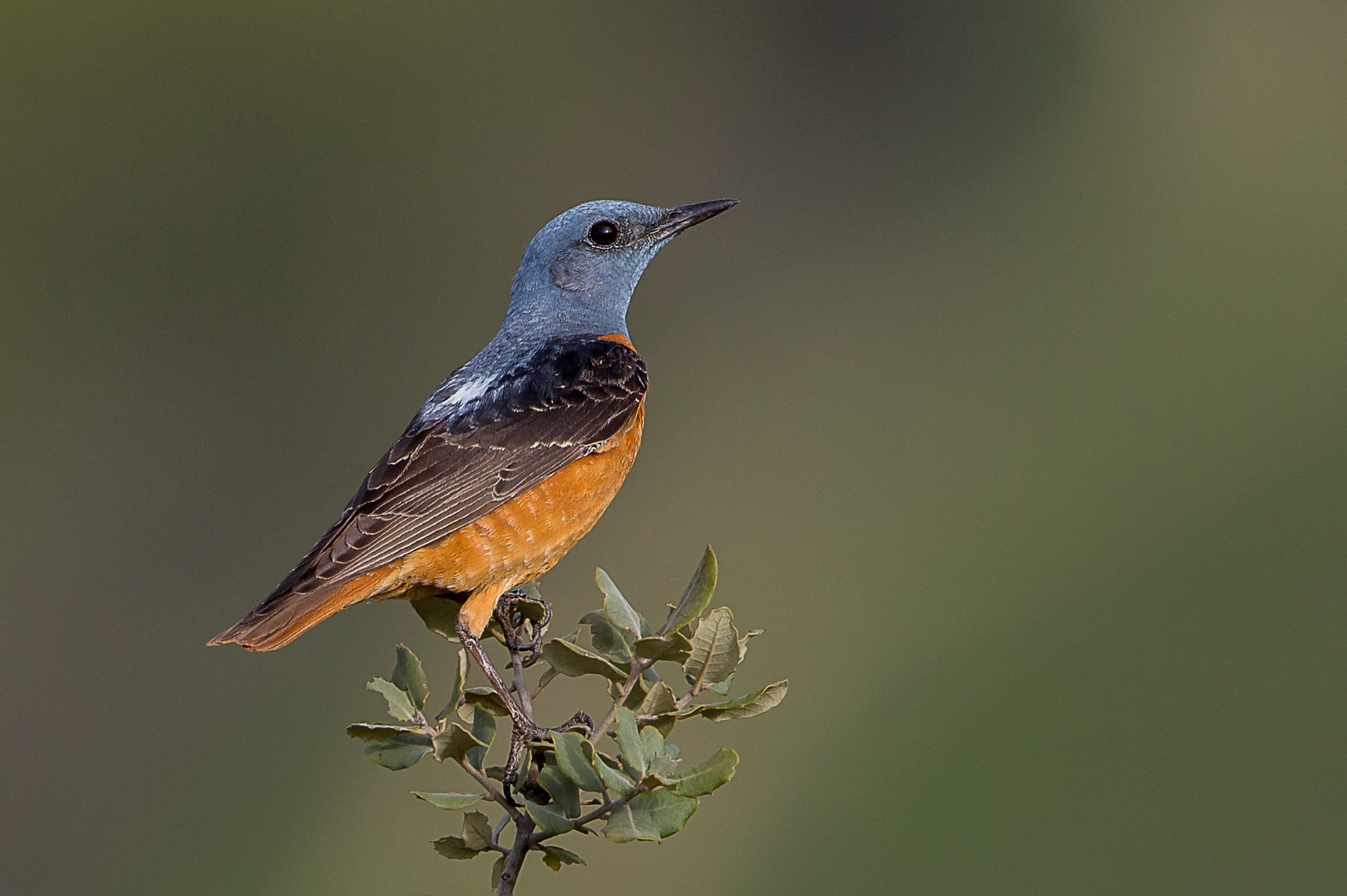
Common rock thrush, Spain

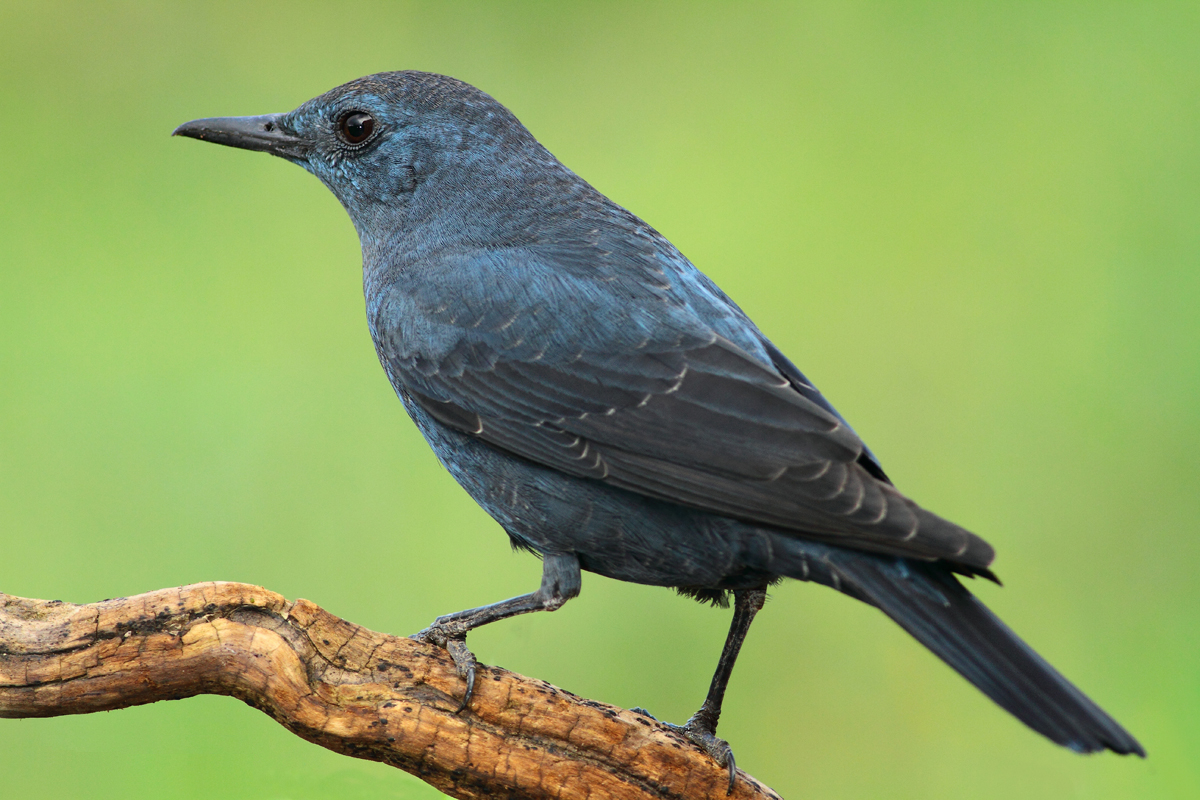
Blue rock thrush, Spain

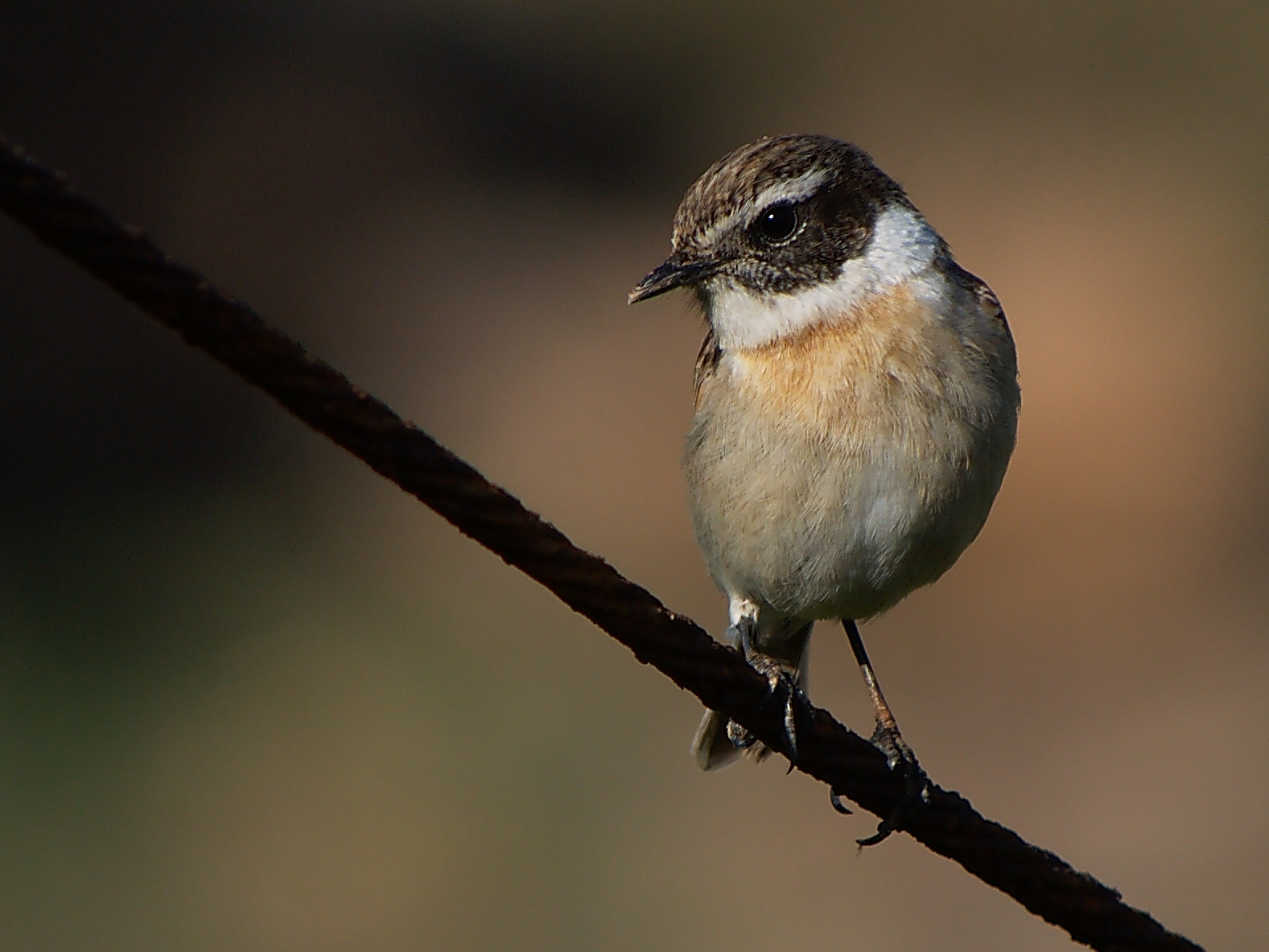
Canary Islands stonechat, Fuerteventura, Canary Islands

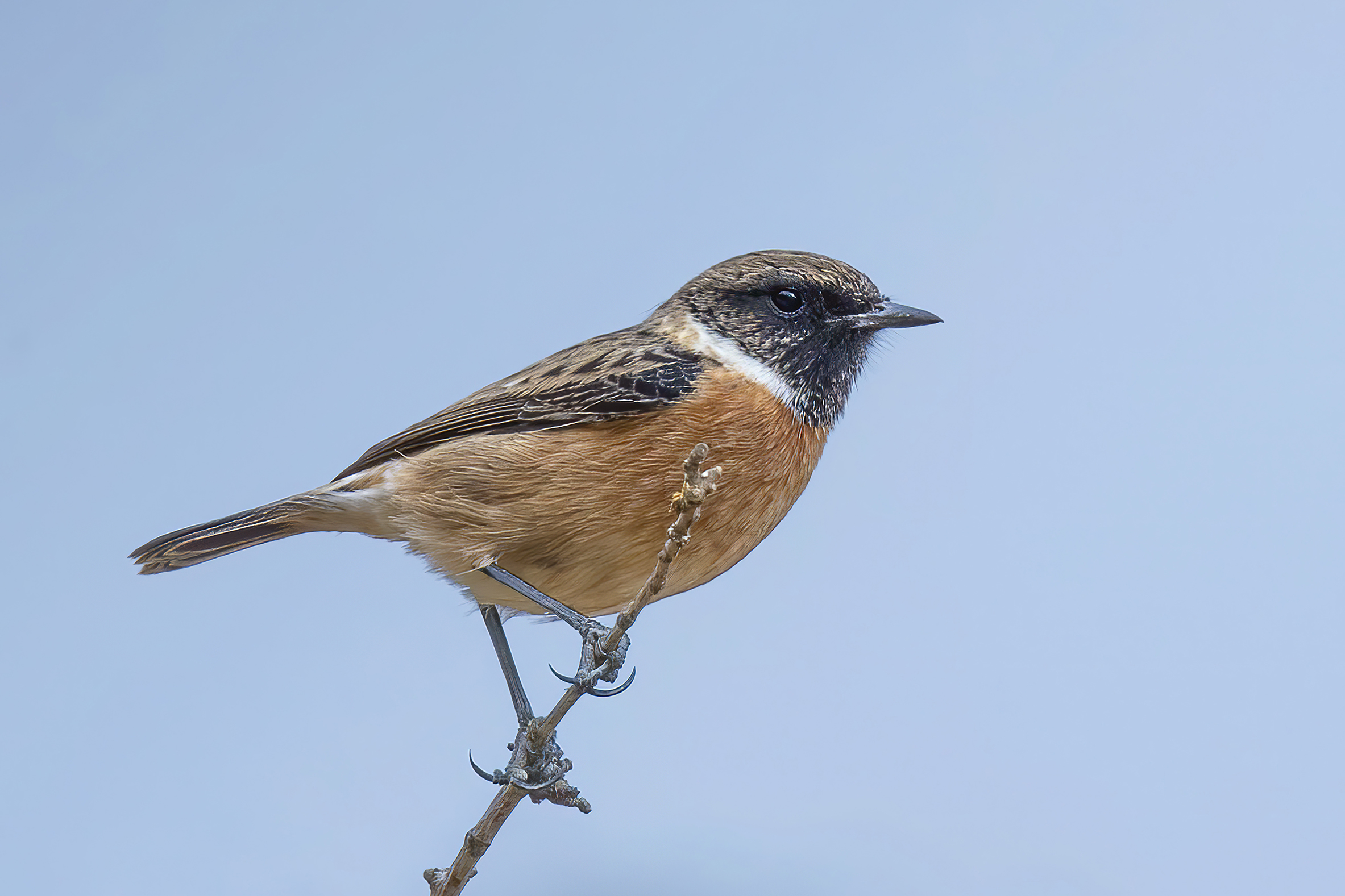
European stonechat, Loja, Granada

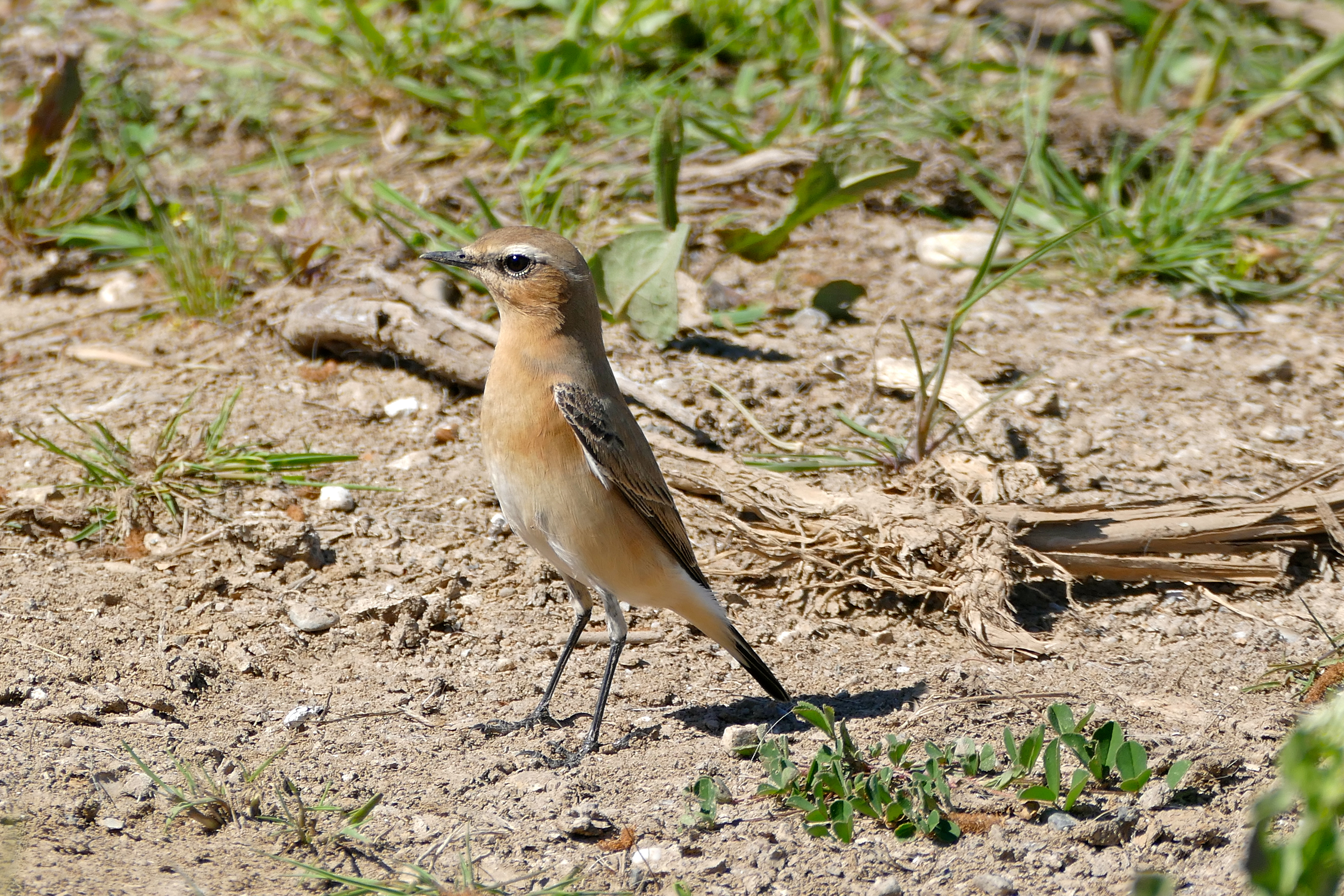
Northern wheatear, Aiguamolls de l'Empordà, Castelló d'Empúries, Catalonia

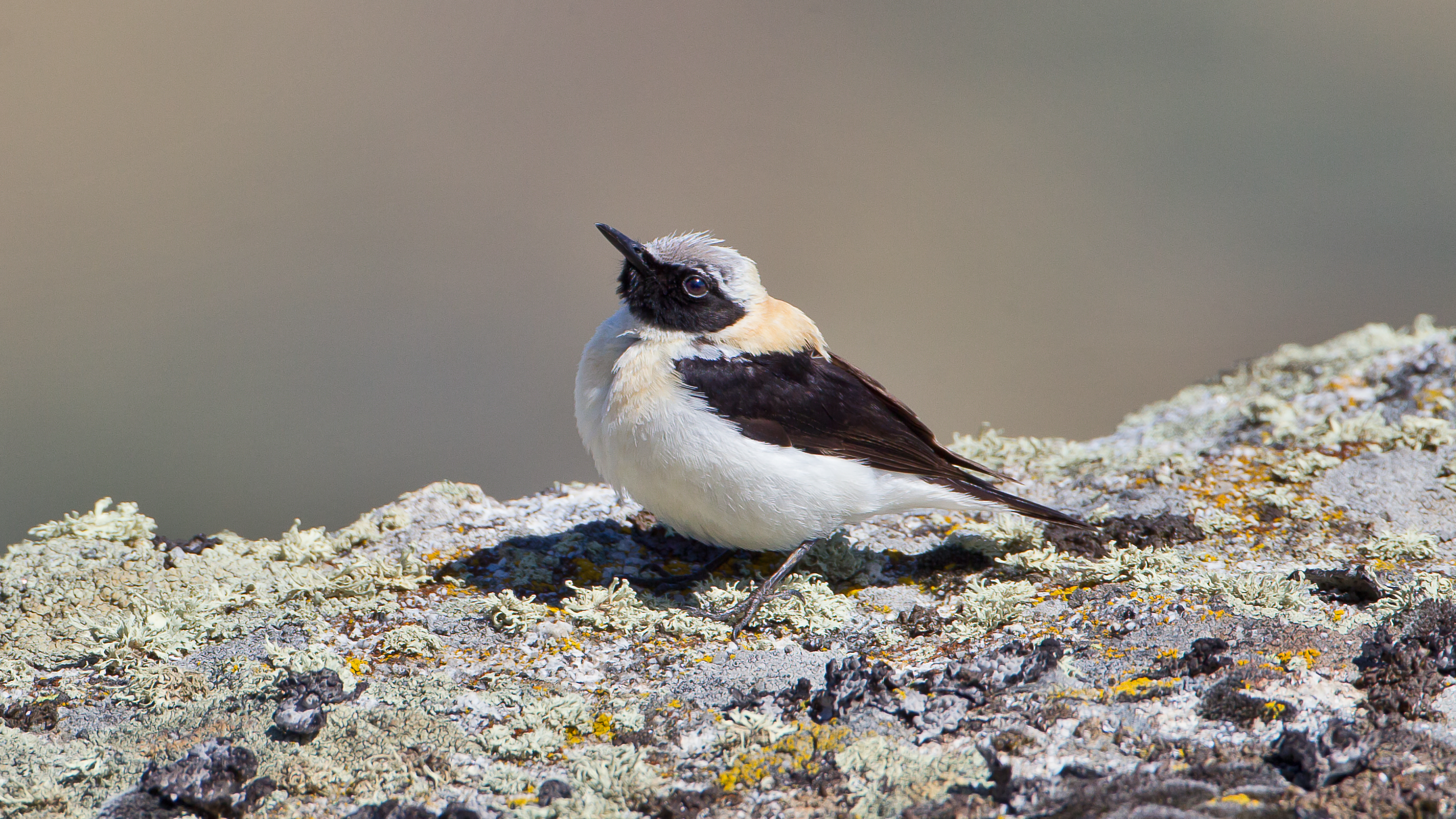
Western black-eared wheatear, Spain

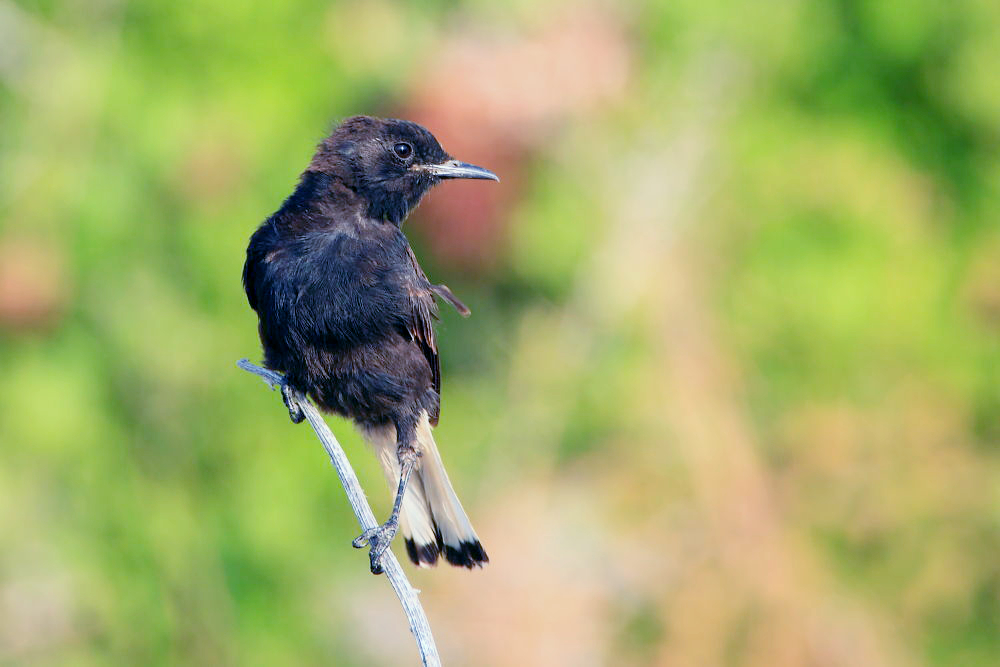
Black wheatear, Garraf, Barcelona

== Dippers ==
Order: Passeriformes Family: Cinclidae

Dippers are a group of perching birds whose habitat includes aquatic environments in the Americas, Europe and Asia. They are named for their bobbing or dipping movements.

- White-throated dipper (mirlo acuático europeo), Cinclus cinclus

== Weavers and allies ==
Order: Passeriformes Family: Ploceidae

The weavers are small passerine birds related to the sparrows, native to Africa and southern Asia. They are seed-eating birds with rounded conical bills. The males of many species are brightly coloured, usually in red or yellow and black, some species show variation in colour only in the breeding season. They are popular as cagebirds and some have established feral populations away from their native ranges.

- Black-headed weaver (tejedor cabecinegro), Ploceus melanocephalus (C)
- Yellow-crowned bishop (obispo coronigualdo), Euplectes afer (C)

== Waxbills and allies ==
Order: Passeriformes Family: Estrildidae

The estrildid finches are small passerine birds of the Old World tropics and Australasia. They are gregarious and often colonial seed eaters with short thick but pointed bills. They are all similar in structure and habits, but have wide variation in plumage colours and patterns. They are popular as cagebirds and several have established feral populations away from their native ranges.

- Orange-cheeked waxbill (estrilda carinaranja), Estrilda melpoda (C)
- Common waxbill (estrilda común), Estrilda astrild (C)
- Black-rumped waxbill (estrilda culinegra), Estrilda troglodytes (C)
- Red avadavat (bengalí rojo), Amandava amandava (C)
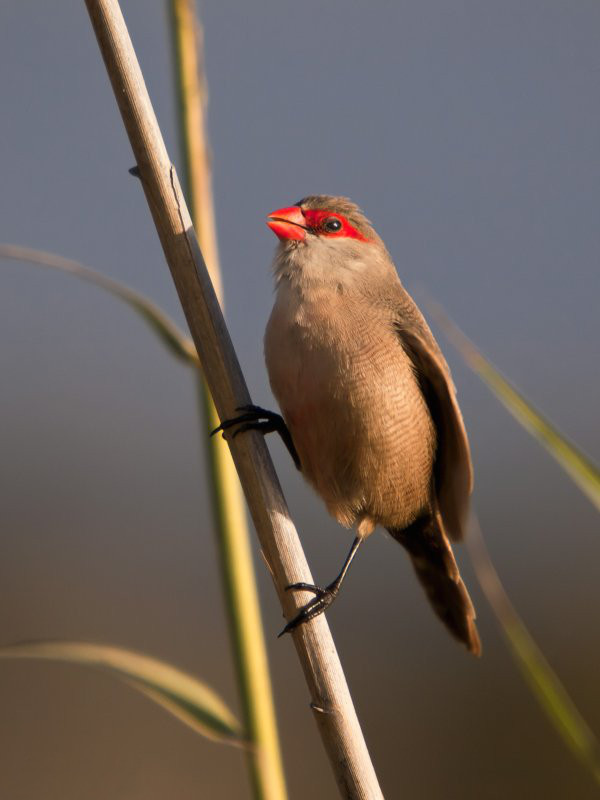
Common waxbill, Gran Canaria

== Old World sparrows ==
Order: Passeriformes Family: Passeridae

Old World sparrows are small passerine birds. In general, sparrows tend to be small, plump, brown or grey birds with short tails and short powerful beaks. Sparrows are seed eaters, but they also consume small insects.

- Rock sparrow (gorrión chillón), Petronia petronia
- White-winged snowfinch (gorrión alpino), Montifringilla nivalis
- Eurasian tree sparrow (gorrión molinero), Passer montanus
- Spanish sparrow (gorrión moruno), Passer hispaniolensis
- House sparrow (gorrión común), Passer domesticus
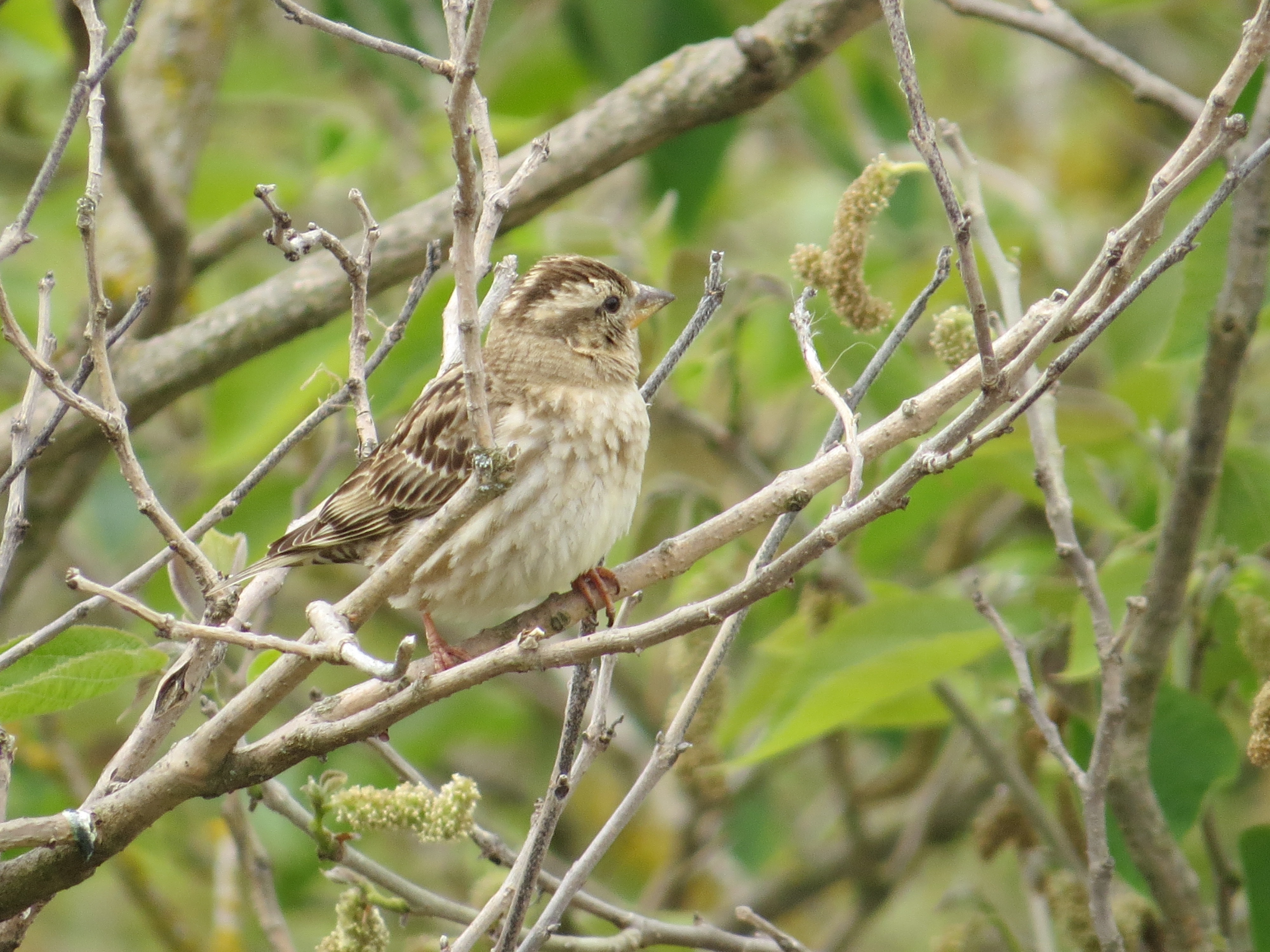
Rock sparrow, Monestir d'Avellanes, Catalunya

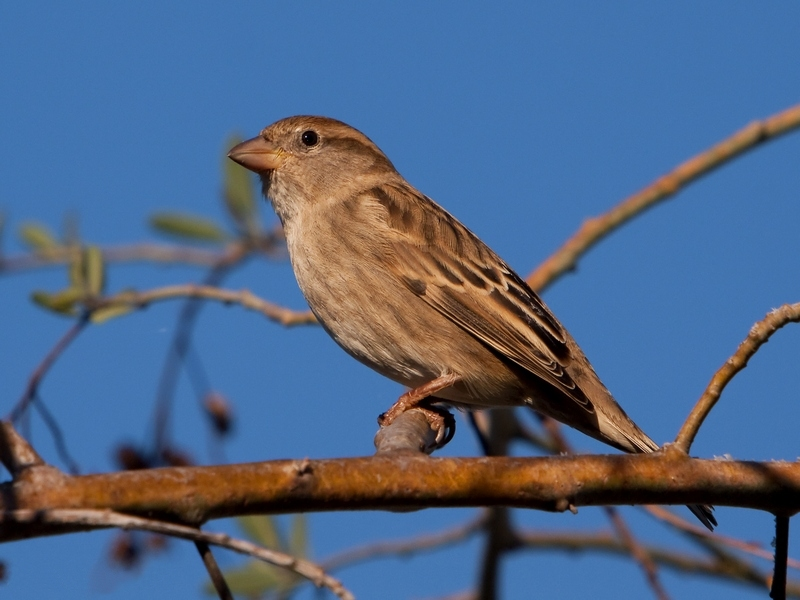
Spanish sparrow, Canary Islands

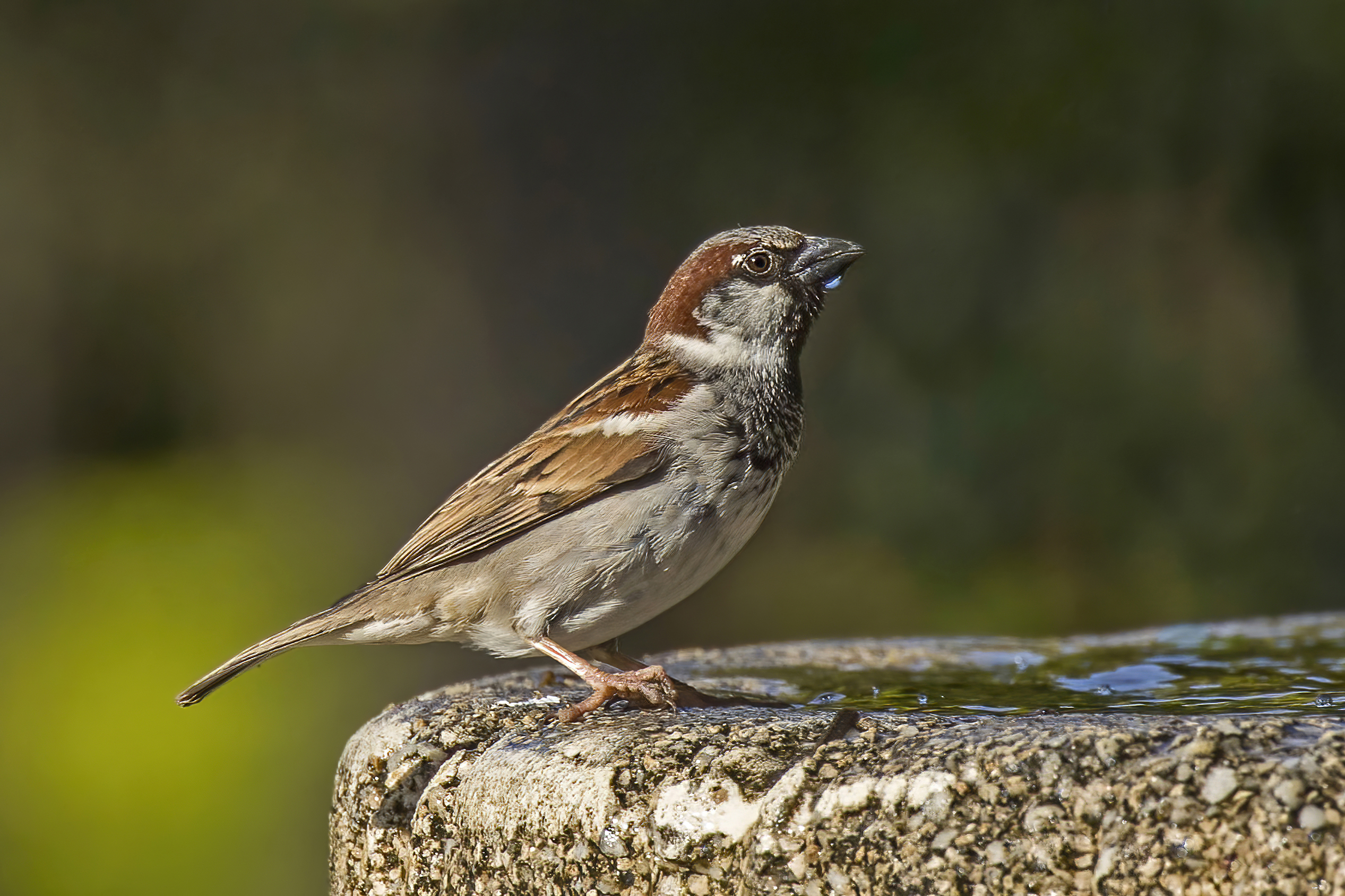
House sparrow (P. d. balearoibericus), Trujillo, Extremadura

== Accentors ==
Order: Passeriformes Family: Prunellidae

The accentors are in the only bird family, Prunellidae, which is completely endemic to the Palearctic. They are small, fairly drab species superficially similar to sparrows.

- Alpine accentor (acentor alpino), Prunella collaris
- Dunnock (acentor común), Prunella modularis
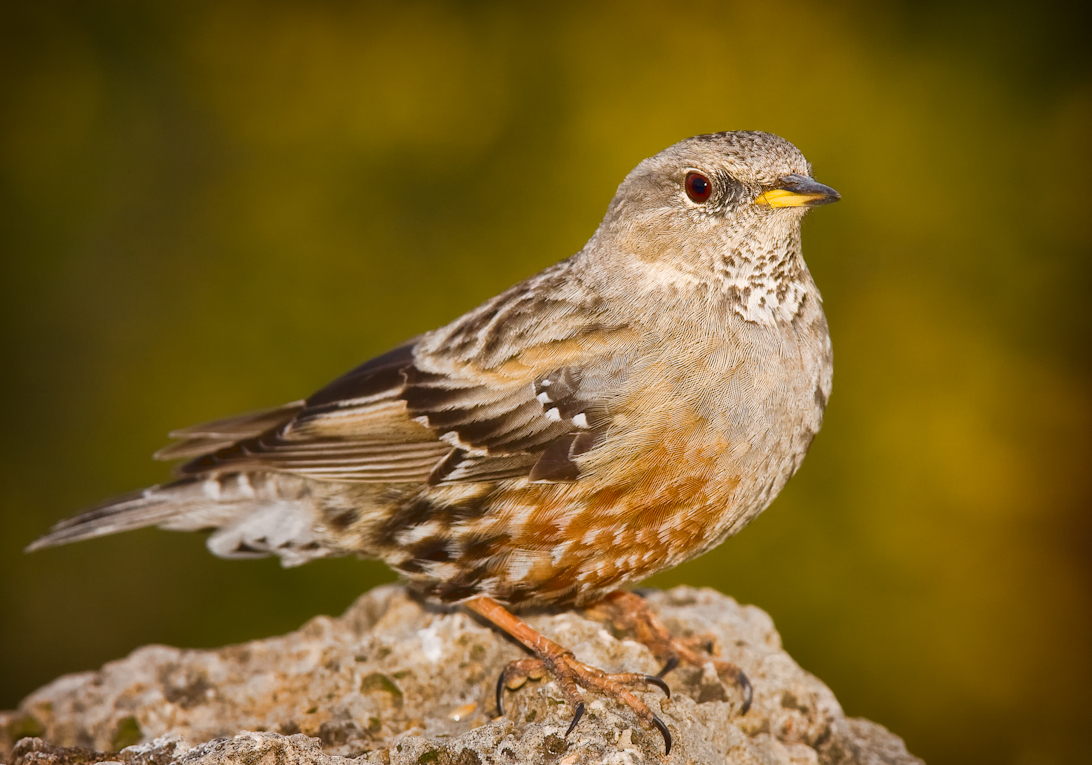
Alpine accentor, Castellón de la Plana, Valencia

== Wagtails and pipits ==
Order: Passeriformes Family: Motacillidae

Motacillidae is a family of small passerine birds with medium to long tails. They include the wagtails, longclaws and pipits. They are slender, ground feeding insectivores of open country.

- Western yellow wagtail (lavandera boyera), Motacilla flava
- Eastern yellow wagtail (lavandera boyera), Motacilla tschutschensis (R)
- Citrine wagtail (lavandera boyera), Motacilla citreola
- Grey wagtail (lavandera cascadeña), Motacilla cinerea
- White wagtail (lavandera blanca), Motacilla alba
- Richard's pipit (bisbita de Richard), Anthus richardi
- Blyth's pipit (bisbita estepario), Anthus godlewskii (R)
- Tawny pipit (bisbita campestre), Anthus campestris
- Meadow pipit (bisbita pratense), Anthus pratensis
- Tree pipit (bisbita arbóreo), Anthus trivialis
- Olive-backed pipit (bisbita de Hodgson), Anthus hodgsoni (R)
- Red-throated pipit (bisbita gorgirrojo), Anthus cervinus
- Buff-bellied pipit (bisbita norteamericano), Anthus rubescens (R)
- Water pipit (bisbita alpino), Anthus spinoletta
- Rock pipit (bisbita costero), Anthus petrosus
- Berthelot's pipit (bisbita caminero), Anthus berthelotii (Canary Islands only)
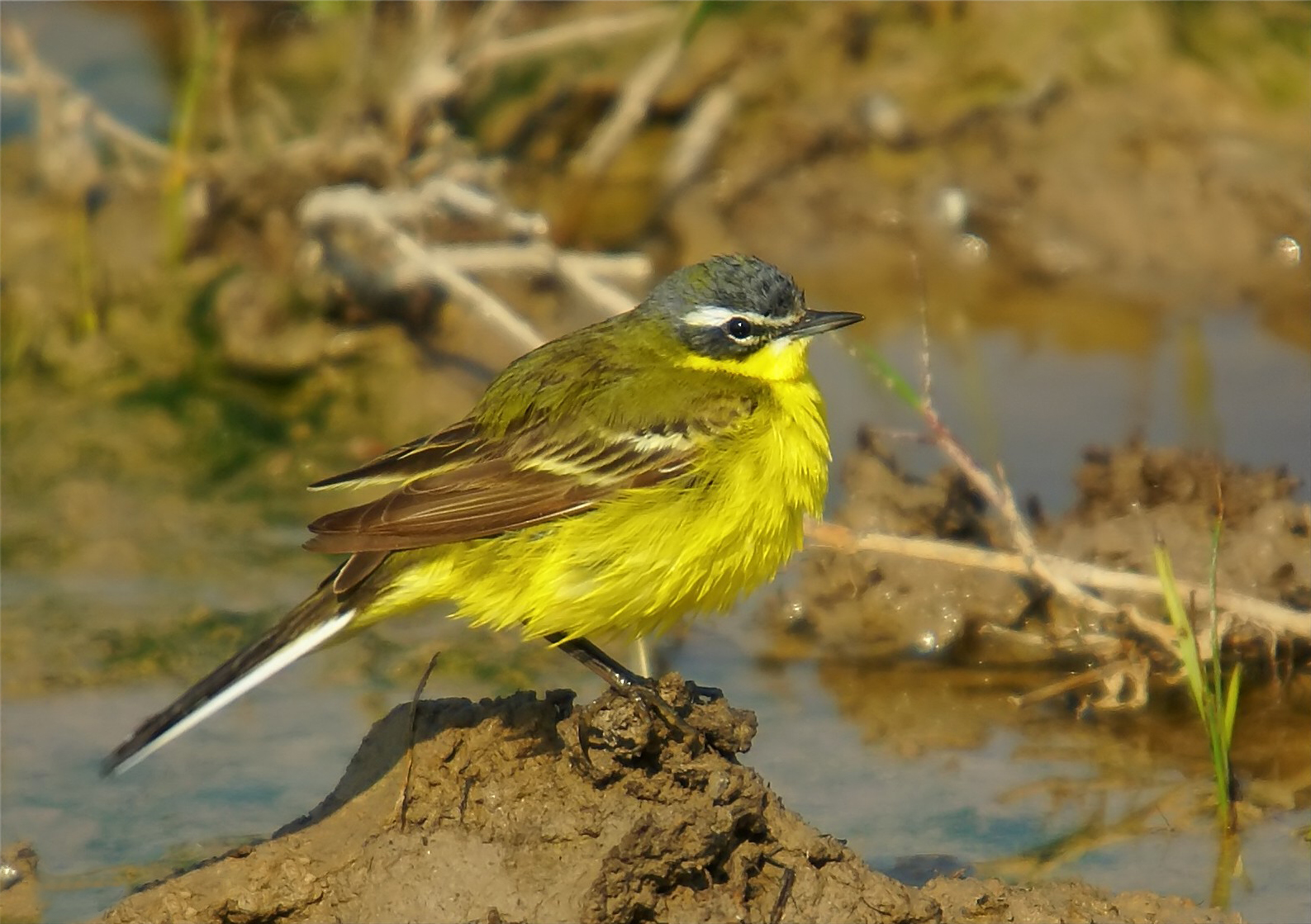
Western yellow wagtail, Llobregat Delta, Barcelona

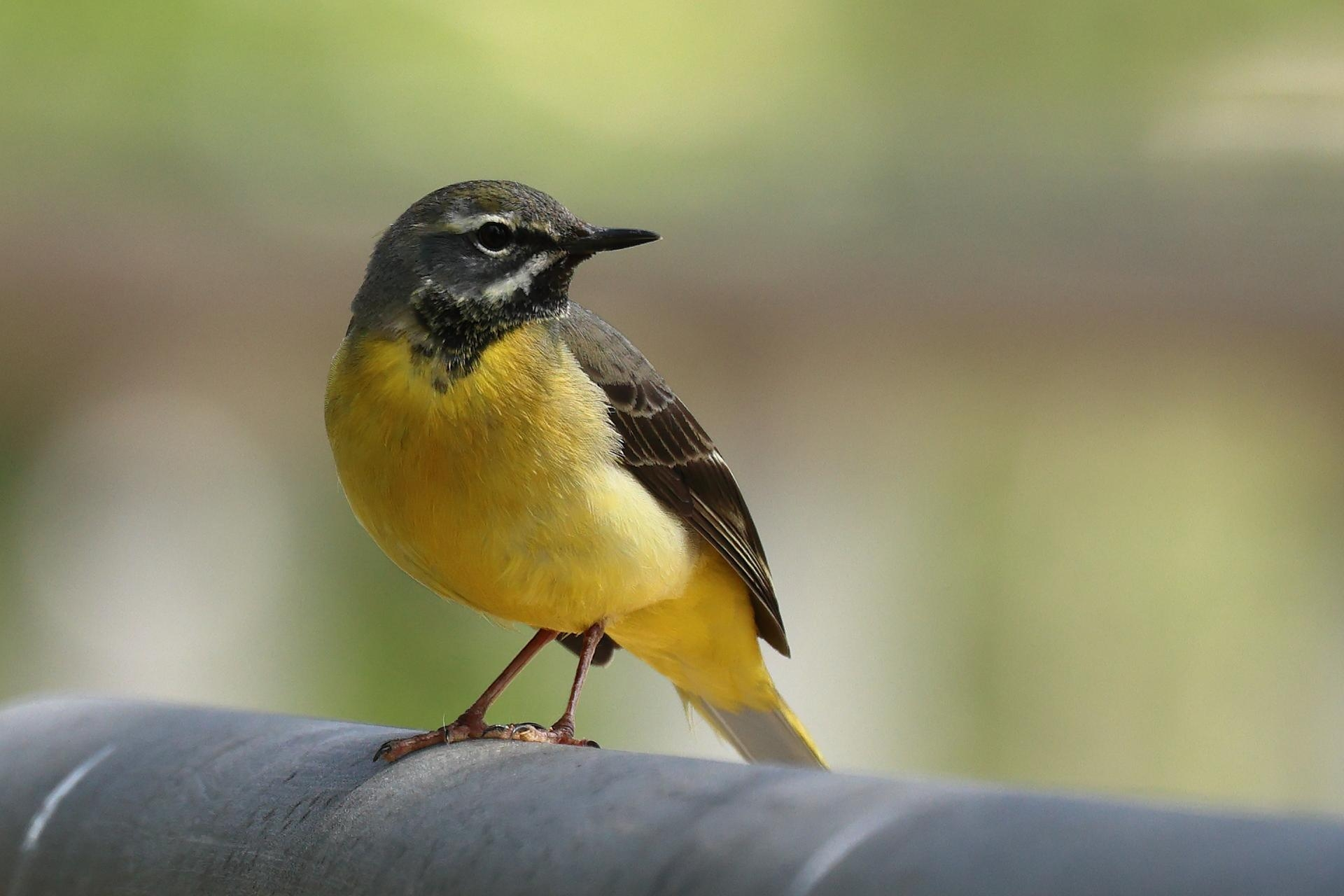
Grey wagtail, Logroño, Spain

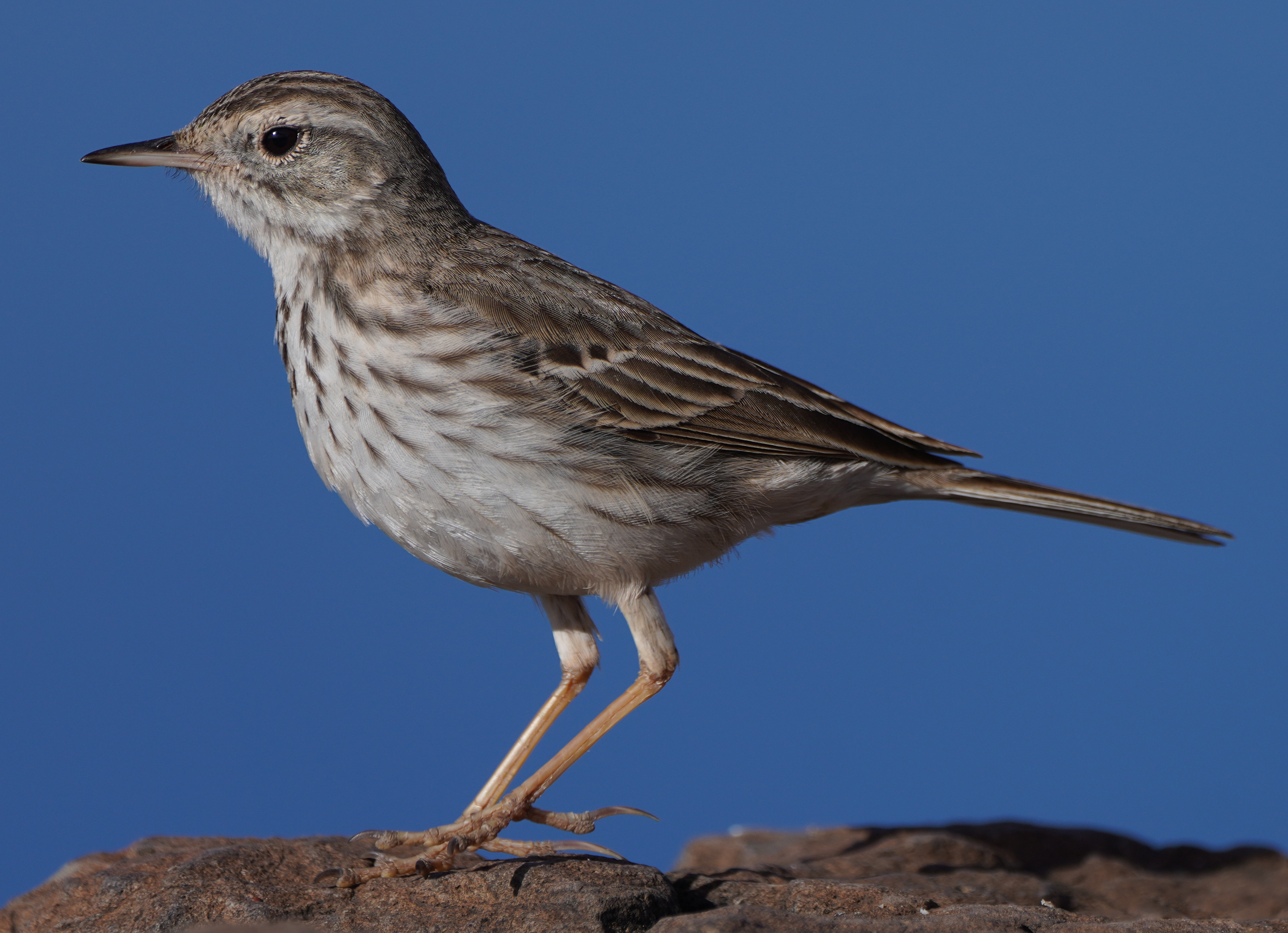
Berthelot's pipit, La Merica, Valle Gran Rey, Santa Cruz de Tenerife, Canary Islands

== Finches, euphonias, and allies ==
Order: Passeriformes Family: Fringillidae

Finches are seed-eating passerine birds, that are small to moderately large and have a strong beak, usually conical and in some species very large. All have twelve tail feathers and nine primaries. These birds have a bouncing flight with alternating bouts of flapping and gliding on closed wings, and most sing well.

- Common chaffinch (pinzón vulgar), Fringilla coelebs
- Tenerife blue chaffinch (pinzón azul de Tenerife), Fringilla teydea (E – Canary Islands)
- Gran Canaria blue chaffinch (pinzón azul de Gran Canaria), Fringilla polatzeki (E – Canary Islands)
- Brambling (pinzón real), Fringilla montifringilla
- Hawfinch (picogordo común), Coccothraustes coccothraustes
- Eurasian bullfinch (camachuelo común), Pyrrhula pyrrhula
- Trumpeter finch (camachuelo trompetero), Bucanetes githagineus
- Common rosefinch (camachuelo carminoso), Carpodacus erythrinus (R)
- European greenfinch (verderón común), Chloris chloris
- Twite (pardillo piquigualdo), Linaria flavirostris (R)
- Common linnet (pardillo común), Linaria cannabina
- Redpoll (pardillo), Acanthis flammea (R)
- Common Crossbill (piquituerto común), Loxia curvirostra
- European goldfinch (jilguero europeo), Carduelis carduelis
- Citril finch (verderón serrano), Carduelis citrinella
- European serin (serín verdecillo), Serinus serinus
- Atlantic canary (serín canario), Serinus canaria (Canary Islands only)
- Eurasian siskin (jilguero lúgano), Spinus spinus
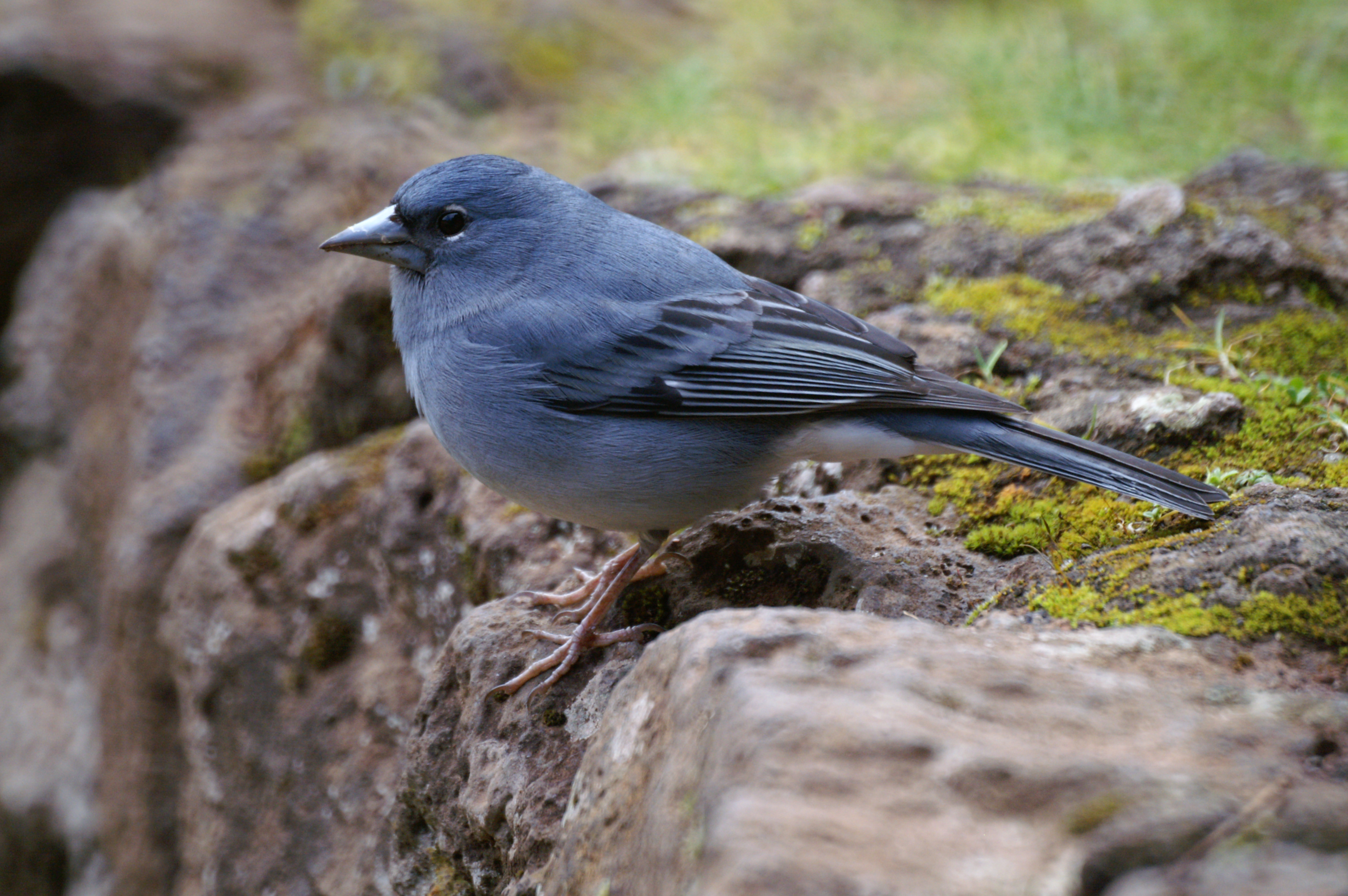
Tenerife blue chaffinch, Tenerife

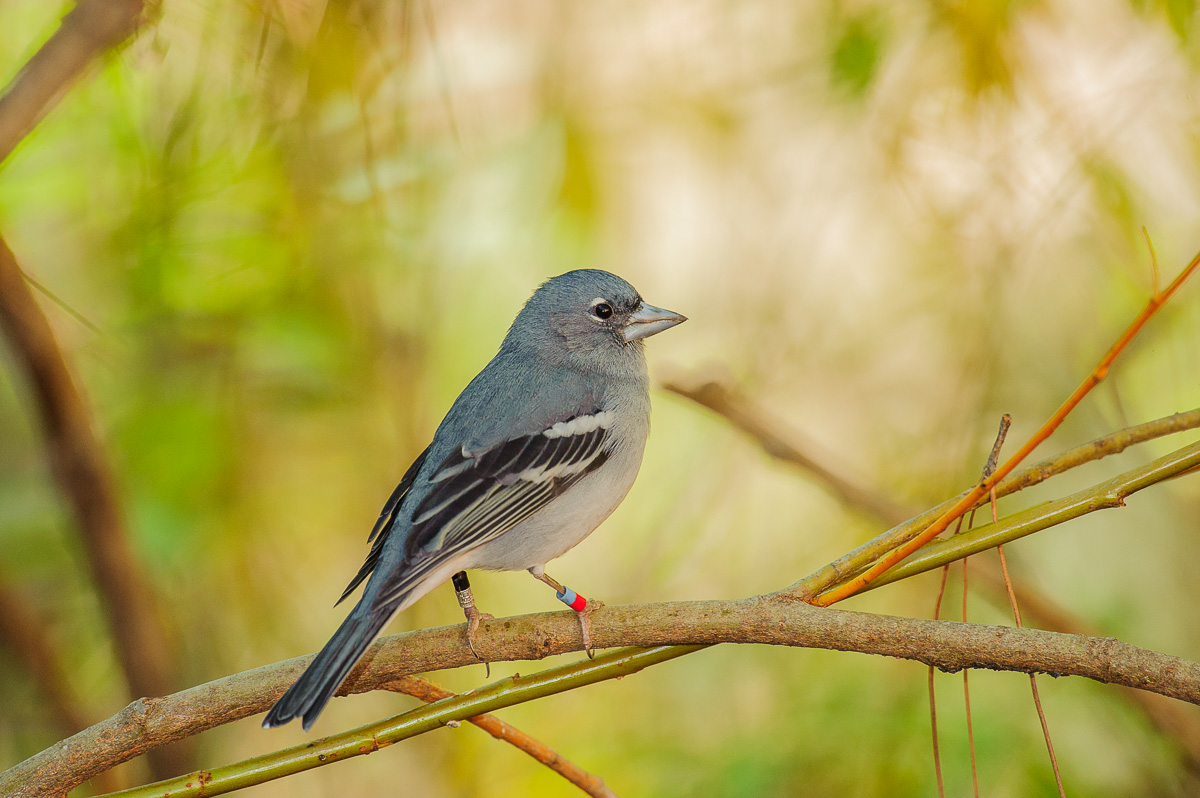
Gran Canaria blue chaffinch, Gran Canaria

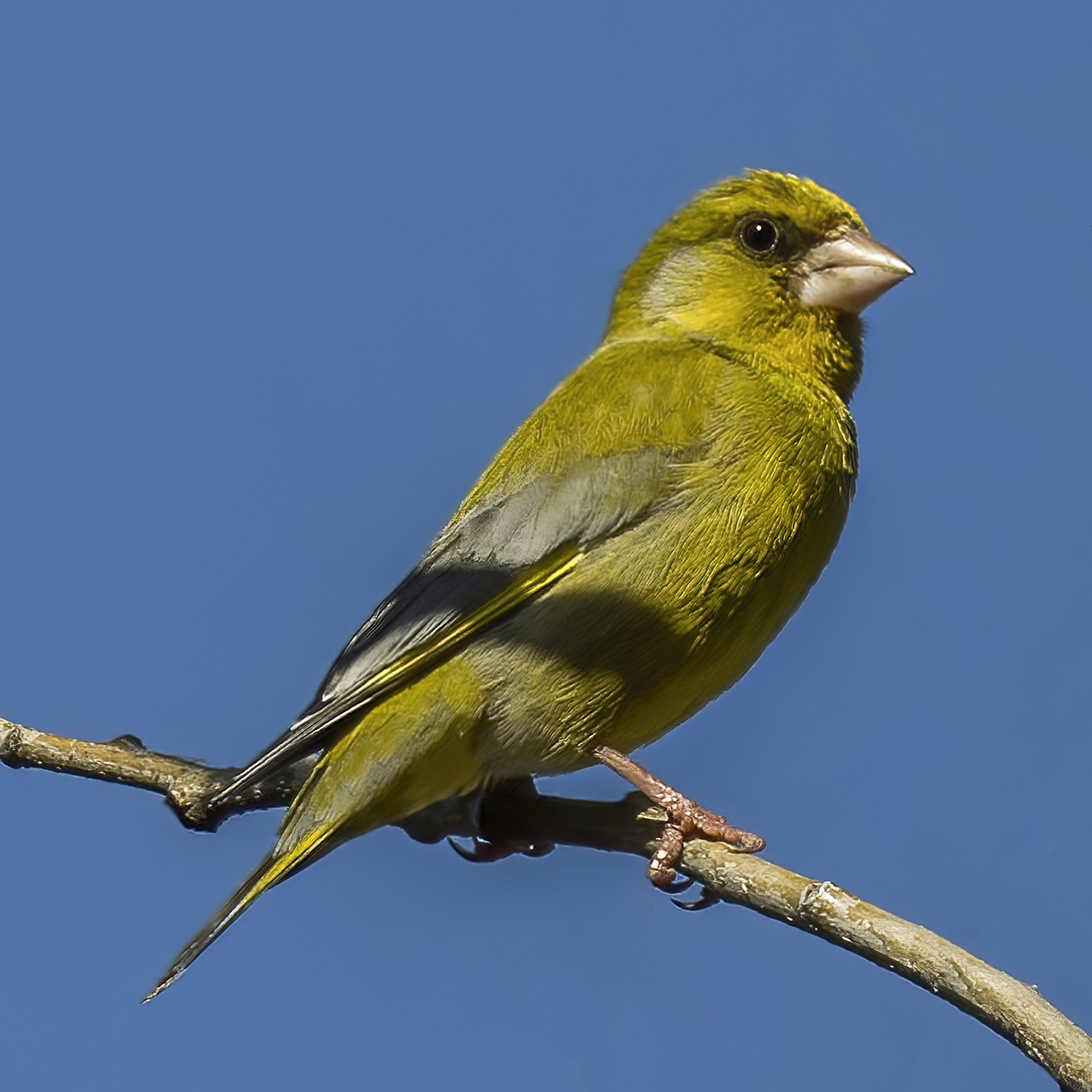
European greenfinch, Extremadura

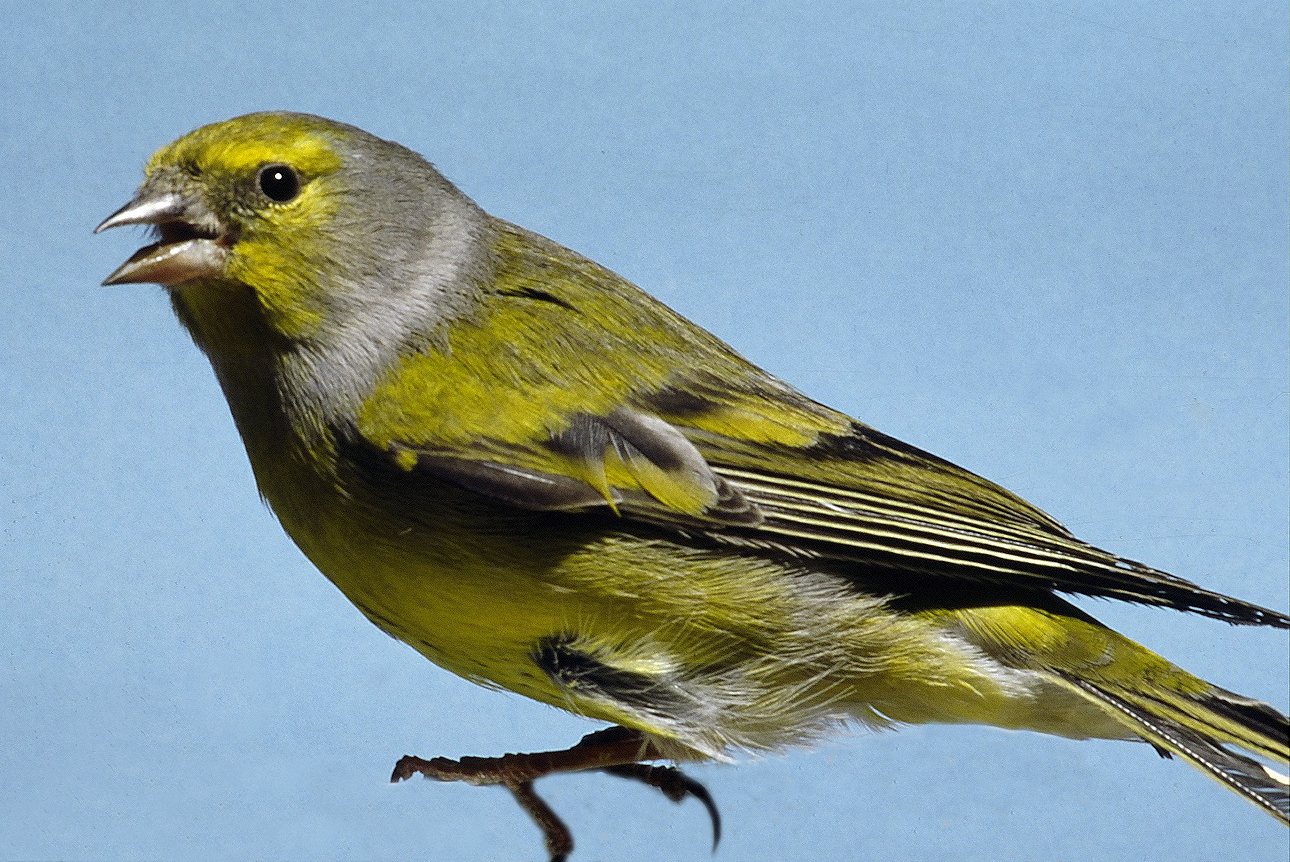
Citril finch, Spain

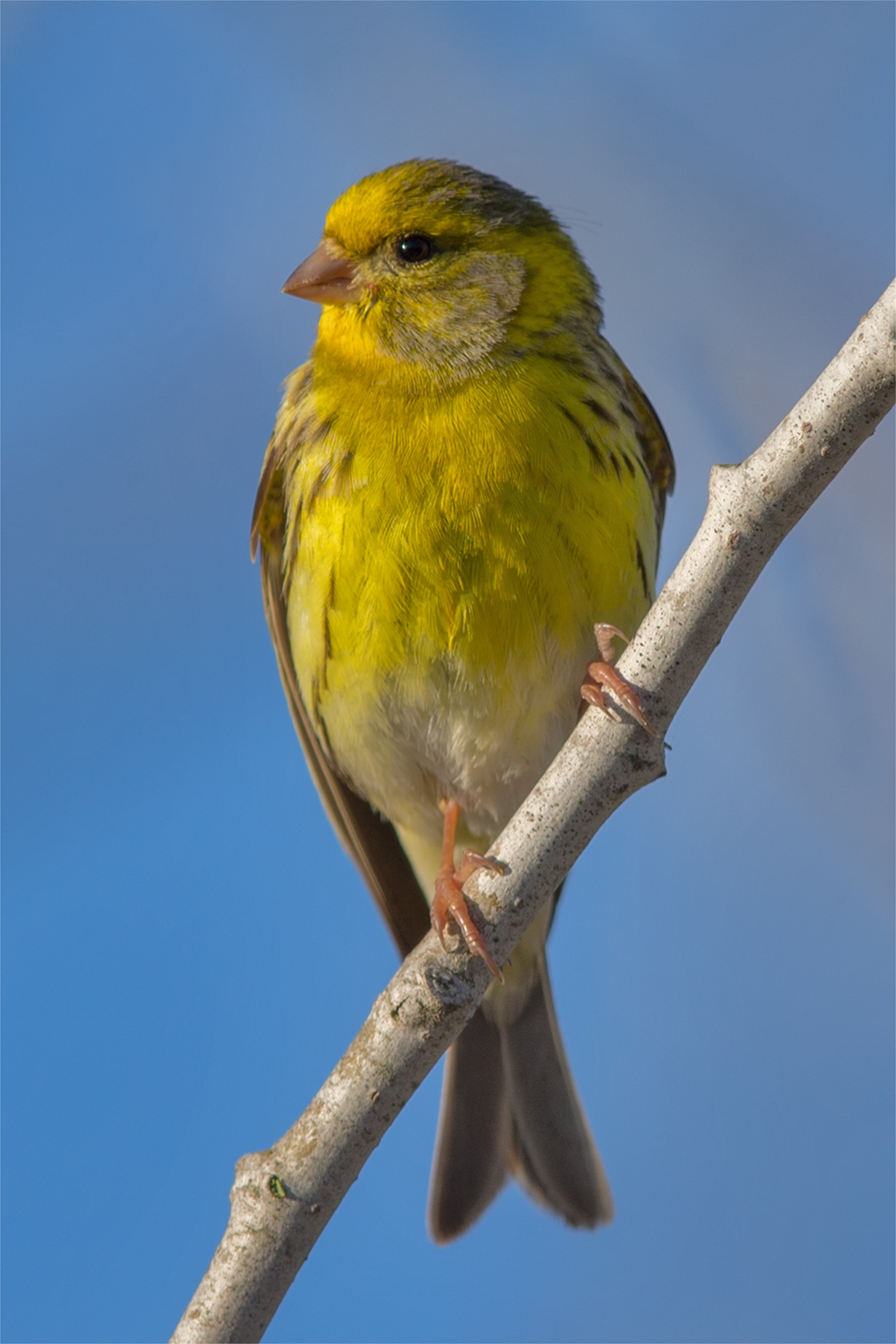
European serin, Mallorca

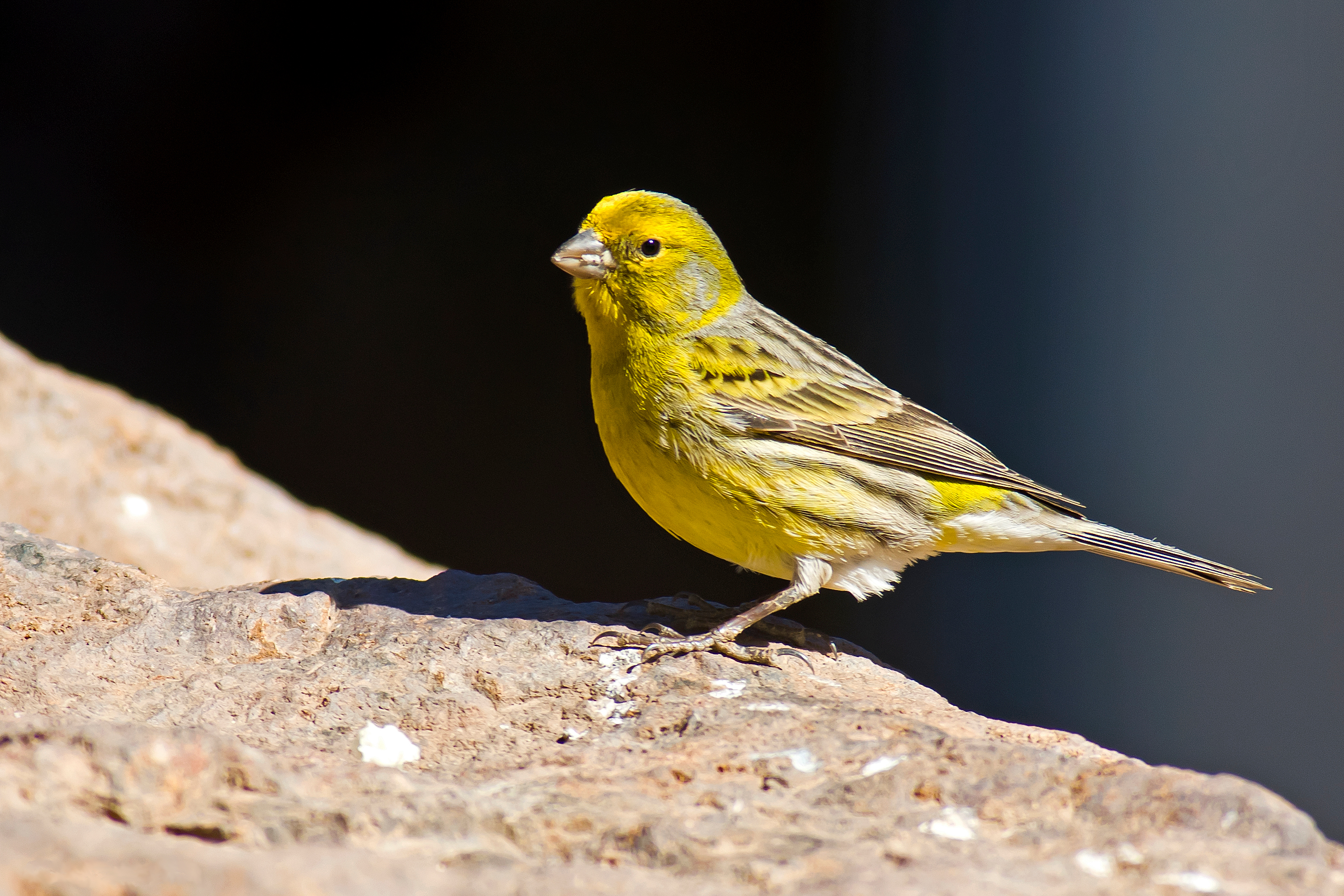
Atlantic canary, Gran Canaria

== Longspurs and snow buntings ==
Order: Passeriformes Family: Calcariidae

The Calcariidae are a group of passerine birds which had been traditionally grouped with the buntings, but differ in a number of respects and are usually found in open grassy areas.

- Lapland longspur (escribano lapón), Calcarius lapponicus (R)
- Snow bunting (escribano nival), Plectrophenax nivalis (R)

== Old World buntings ==
Order: Passeriformes Family: Emberizidae

The emberizids are a large family of passerine birds. They are seed-eating birds with distinctively shaped bills. Many emberizid species have distinctive head patterns.

- Corn bunting (escribano triguero), Emberiza calandra
- Yellowhammer (escribano cerillo), Emberiza citrinella
- Pine bunting (escribano cabeciblanco), Emberiza leucocephalos (R)
- Rock bunting (escribano montesino), Emberiza cia
- Ortolan bunting (escribano hortelano), Emberiza hortulana
- Cretzschmar's bunting (escribano ceniciento), Emberiza caesia (R)
- Cirl bunting (escribano soteño), Emberiza cirlus
- House bunting (escribano sahariano), Emberiza sahari (R)
- Little bunting (escribano pigmeo), Emberiza pusilla (R)
- Rustic bunting (escribano rústico), Emberiza rustica (R)
- Yellow-breasted bunting (escribano aureolado), Emberiza aureola (R)
- Black-headed bunting (escribano cabecinegro), Emberiza melanocephala (R)
- Red-headed bunting (escribano carirrojo), Emberiza bruniceps (R)
- Black-faced bunting (escribano enmascarado), Emberiza spodocephala (R)
- Reed bunting (escribano palustre), Emberiza schoeniclus
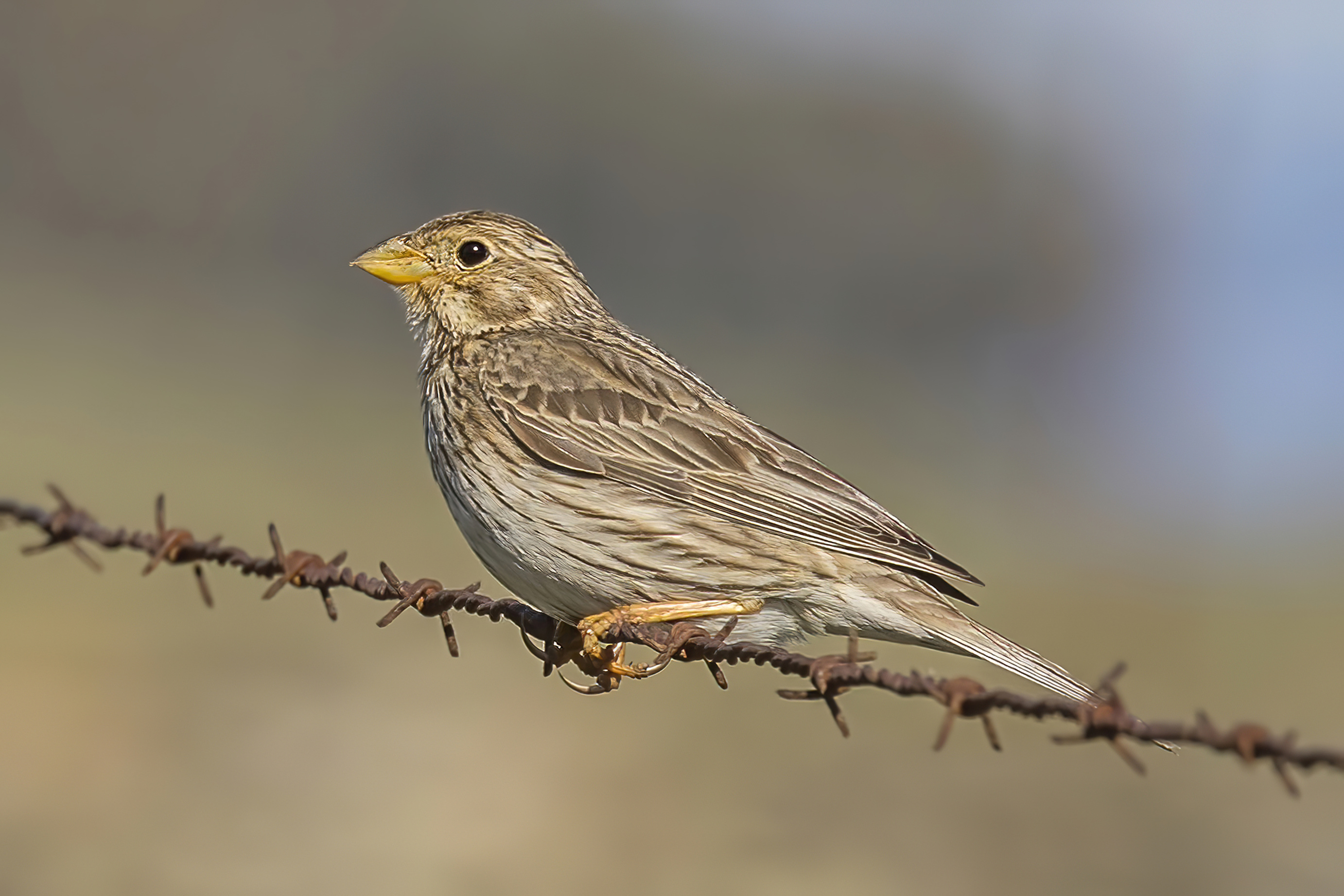
Corn bunting, Extremadura

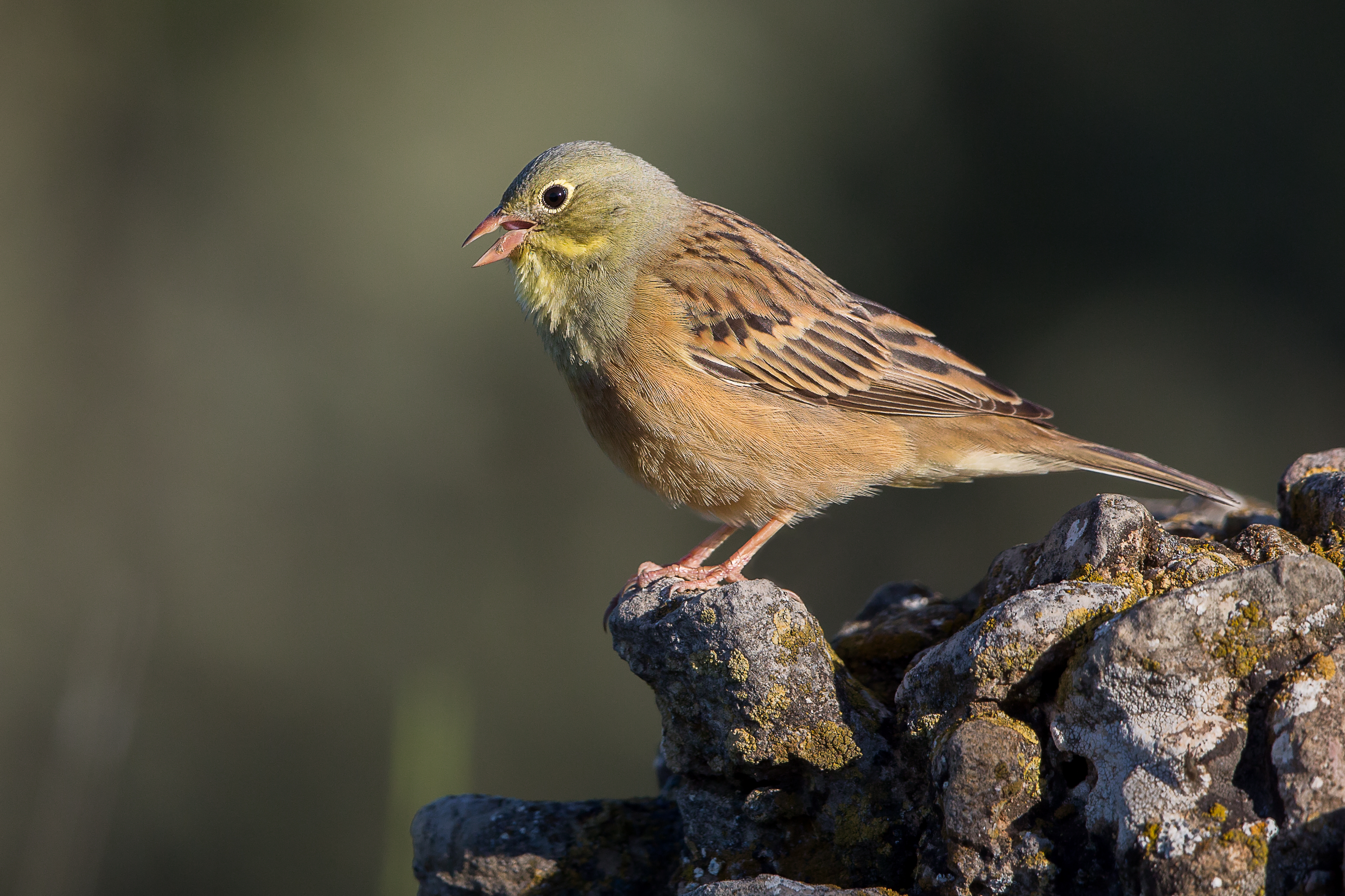
Ortolan bunting, Sierra de Guara, Aragon

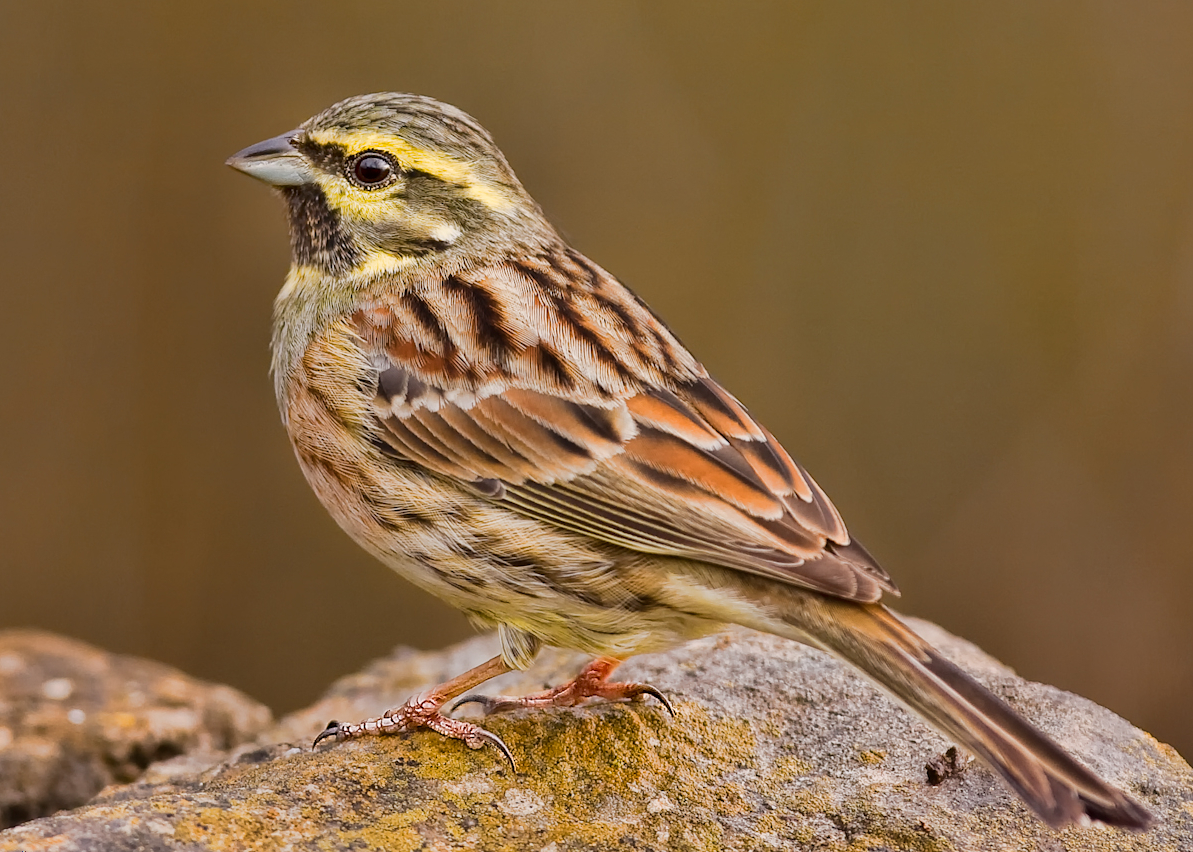
Cirl bunting, Ayódar, Valencia

== New World sparrows ==
Order: Passeriformes Family: Passerellidae

The New World sparrows (or American sparrows) are a large family of seed-eating passerine birds with distinctively bunting-like bills and formerly included with them in the Emberizidae. Several species have been recorded as transatlantic vagrants in Europe.

- White-throated sparrow (chingolo gorgiblanco), Zonotrichia albicollis (R)
- Song sparrow (chingolo cantor), Melospiza melodia (R)

== Troupials and allies ==
Order: Passeriformes Family: Icteridae

Icterids make up a family of small- to medium-sized, often colourful, New World passerine birds. Most species have black as a predominant plumage colour, often enlivened by yellow, orange or red. The species in the family vary widely in size, shape, behaviour and colour. A few species have been recorded as transatlantic vagrants in Europe.

- Bobolink (tordo charlatán), Dolichonyx oryzivorus (R)

== New World warblers ==
Order: Passeriformes Family: Parulidae

The New World warblers are a group of small often colourful passerine birds restricted to the New World. Most are arboreal, but some are more terrestrial. Most members of this family are insectivores. Several species have been recorded as transatlantic vagrants in Europe.

- Northern waterthrush (reinita charquera norteña), Parkesia noveboracensis (R)
- Black-and-white warbler (reinita trepadora), Mniotilta varia (R)
- Common yellowthroat (mascarita común), Geothlypis trichas (R)
- Yellow-rumped warbler (reinita coronada), Setophaga coronata (R)

== See also ==
- List of birds
- Lists of birds by region
