= Cable transport =

Class of transport modes

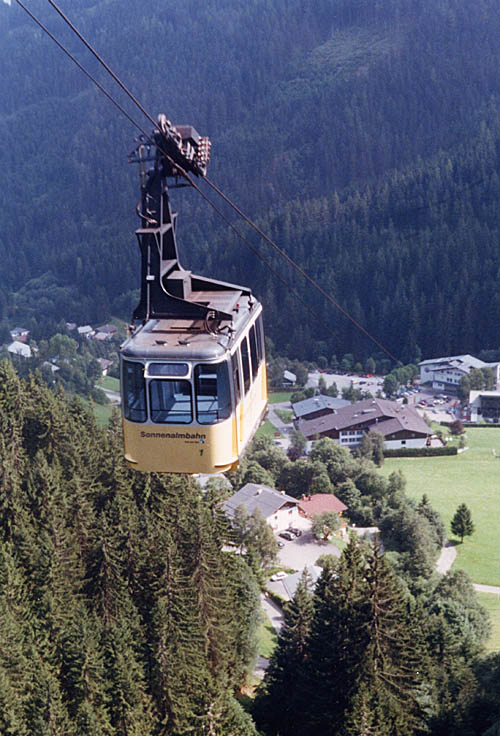
Cable car at Zell am See in the Austrian Alps

Cable transport is a broad class of transport modes that have cables. They transport passengers and goods, often in vehicles called cable cars. The cable may be driven or passive, and items may be moved by pulling, sliding, sailing, or by drives within the object being moved on cableways. The use of pulleys and balancing of loads moving up and down are common elements of cable transport. They are often used in mountainous areas where cable haulage can overcome large differences in elevation.

== Common modes of cable transport ==
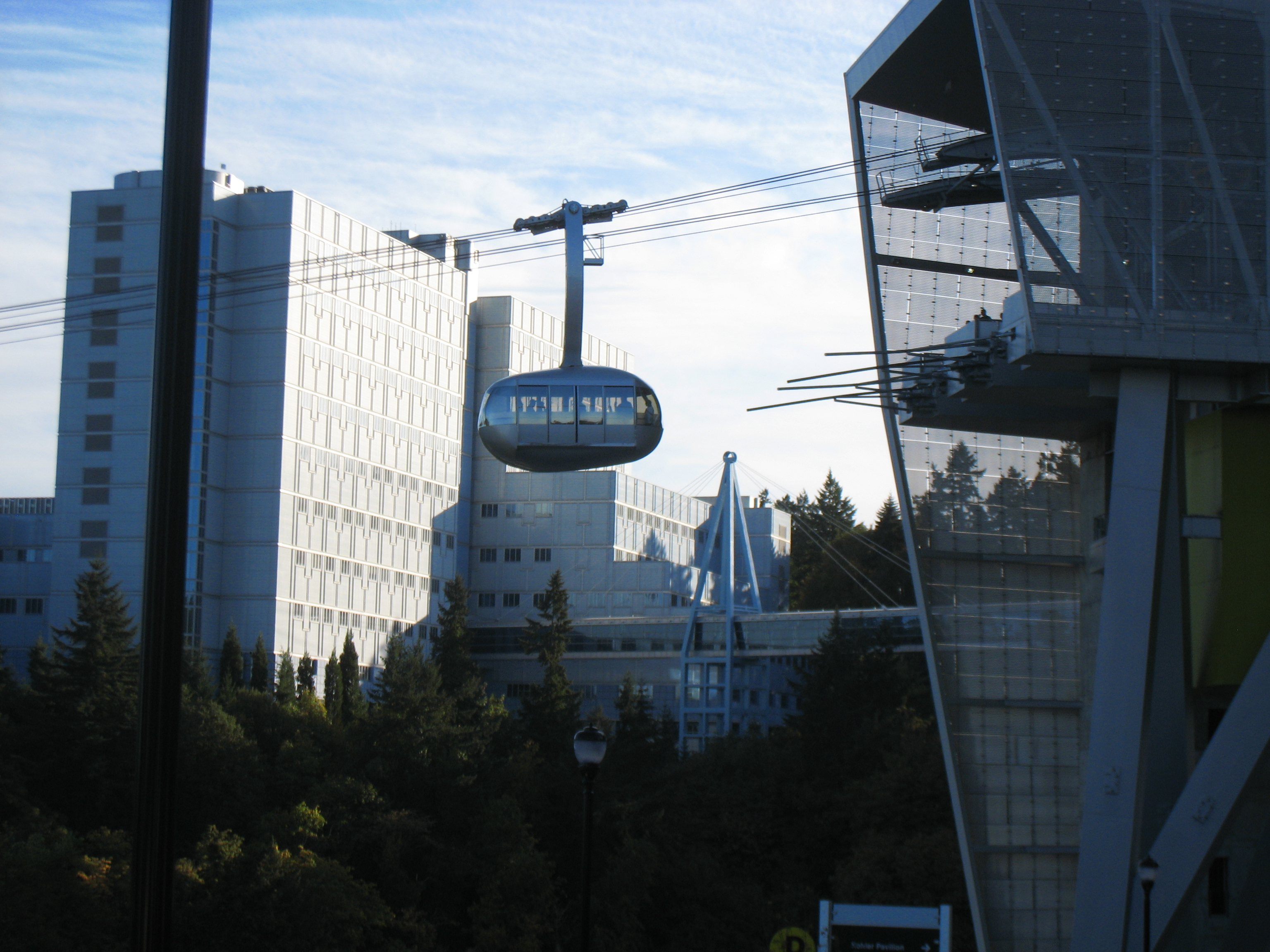
The Portland Aerial Tram

=== Aerial transport ===
Forms of cable transport in which one or more cables are strung between supports of various forms and cars are suspended from these cables.

- Aerial tramway
- Chairlift
- Funitel
- Gondola lift
- Ski lift
- Zip line

=== Cable railways ===
Forms of cable transport where cars on rails are hauled by cables. The rails are usually steeply inclined and usually at ground level.

- Cable car
- Funicular

=== Other ===
Other forms of cable-hauled transport.

- Cable ferry
- Surface lift
- Elevator

== History ==
Rope-drawn transport dates back to 250 BC as evidenced by illustrations of aerial ropeway transportation systems in South China.

=== Early aerial tramways ===
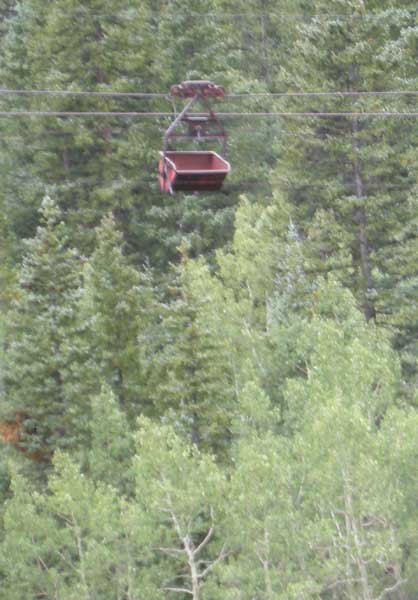
An aerial tramway used in mining, at the Shenandoah-Dives Mill in Silverton, Colorado

The first recorded mechanical ropeway was by Venetian Fausto Veranzio who designed a bi-cable passenger ropeway in 1616. The industry generally considers Dutchman Adam Wybe to have built the first operational system in 1644. The technology, which was further developed by the people living in the Alpine regions of Europe, progressed and expanded with the advent of wire rope and electric drive.

The first use of wire rope for aerial tramways is disputed. American inventor Peter Cooper is one early claimant, constructing an aerial tramway using wire rope in Baltimore 1832, to move landfill materials. Though there is only partial evidence for the claimed 1832 tramway, Cooper was involved in many of such tramways built in the 1850s, and in 1853 he built a two-mile-long tramway to transport iron ore to his blast furnaces at Ringwood, New Jersey.

World War I motivated extensive use of military tramways for warfare between Italy and Austria.

During the industrial revolution, new forms of cable-hauled transportation systems were created including the use of steel cable to allow for greater load support and larger systems. Aerial tramways were first used for commercial passenger haulage in the 1900s.

=== The first cable railways ===
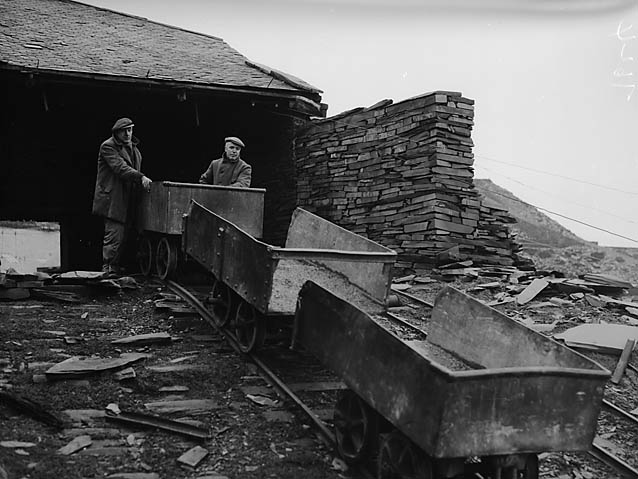
A gravity incline in use in 1955 at Llechwedd quarry in Wales. Empty wagons are arriving at the top of the incline – the winding drum is in the shed in the background

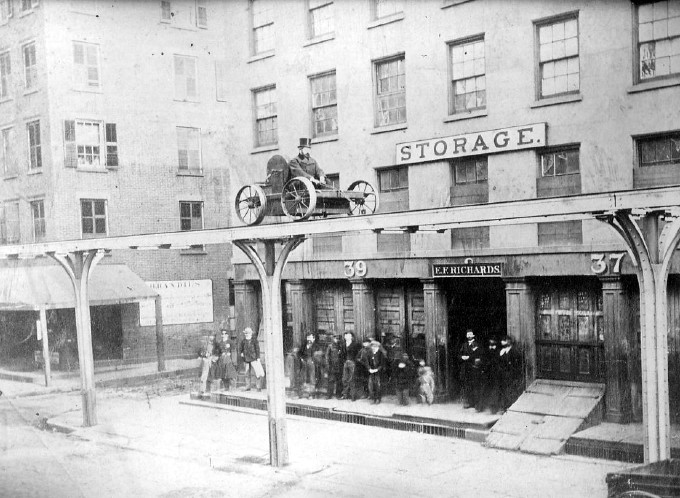
A test run on the Westside and Yonkers Patent Railway Company line in 1867

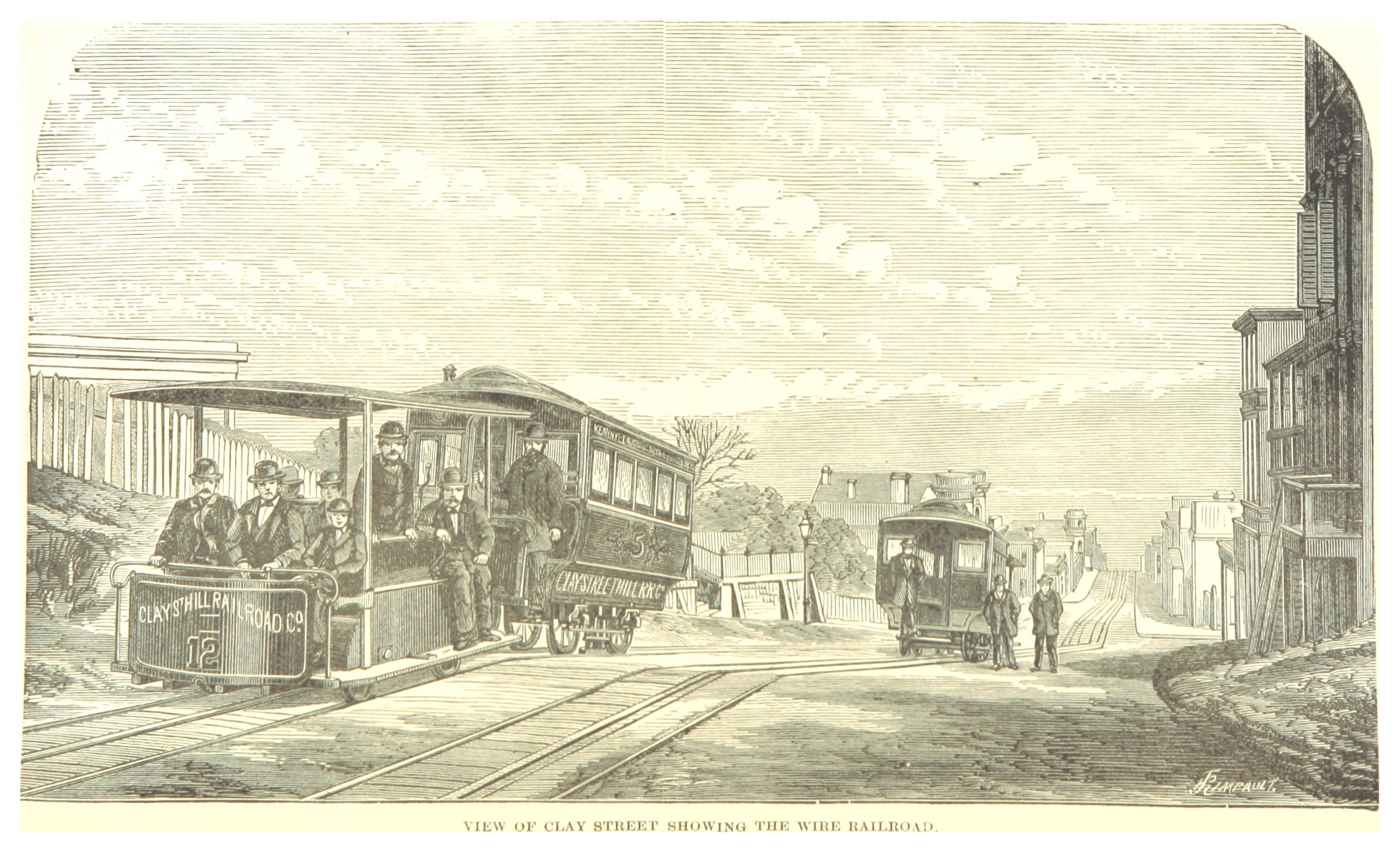
Hallidie's Clay Street Hill Railroad, the first successful cable railway running at street level

The earliest form of cable railway was the gravity incline, which in its simplest form consists of two parallel tracks laid on a steep gradient, with a single rope wound around a winding drum and connecting the trains of wagons on the tracks. Loaded wagons at the top of the incline are lowered down, their weight hauling empty wagons from the bottom. The winding drum has a brake to control the rate of travel of the wagons. The first use of a gravity incline isn't recorded, but the Llandegai Tramway at Bangor in North Wales was opened in 1798, and is one of the earliest examples using iron rails.

The first cable-hauled street railway was the London and Blackwall Railway, built in 1840, which used fibre to grip the haulage rope. This caused a series of technical and safety issues, which led to the adoption of steam locomotives by 1848.

The first Funicular railway was opened in Lyon in 1862.

The Westside and Yonkers Patent Railway Company developed a cable-hauled elevated railway. This 3½ mile long line was proposed in 1866 and opened in 1868. It operated as a cable railway until 1871 when it was converted to use steam locomotives.

The next development of the cable car came in California. Andrew Hallidie, a Scottish emigre, gave San Francisco the first effective and commercially successful route, using steel cables, opening the Clay Street Hill Railroad on August 2, 1873. Hallidie was a manufacturer of steel cables. The system featured a human-operated grip, which was able to start and stop the car safely. The rope that was used allowed the multiple, independent cars to run on one line, and soon Hallidie's concept was extended to multiple lines in San Francisco.

The first cable railway outside the United Kingdom and the United States was the Roslyn Tramway, which opened in 1881, in Dunedin, New Zealand. America remained the country that made the greatest use of cable railways; by 1890 more than 500 miles of cable-hauled track had been laid, carrying over 1,000,000 passengers per year. However, in 1890, electric tramways exceeded the cable hauled tramways in mileage, efficiency and speed.

=== Early ski lifts ===
The first surface lift was built in 1908 by German Robert Winterhalder in Schollach/Eisenbach, Hochschwarzwald and started operations February 14, 1908.

A steam-powered toboggan tow, 950 feet (290 m) in length, was built in Truckee, California, in 1910. The first skier-specific tow in North America was apparently installed in 1933 by Alec Foster at Shawbridge in the Laurentians outside Montreal, Quebec.

The modern J-bar and T-bar mechanism was invented in 1934 by the Swiss engineer Ernst Constam, with the first lift installed in Davos, Switzerland.

The first chairlift was developed by James Curran in 1936. The co-owner of the Union Pacific Railroad, William Averell Harriman owned America's first ski resort, Sun Valley, Idaho. He asked his design office to tackle the problem of lifting skiers to the top of the resort. Curran, a Union Pacific bridge designer, adapted a cable hoist he had designed for loading bananas in Honduras to create the first ski lift.

=== More recent developments ===
More recent developments are being classified under the type of track that their design is based upon. After the success of this operation, several other projects were initiated in New Zealand and Chicago. The social climate around pollution is allowing for a shift from cars back to the utilization of cable transport due to their advantages. However, for many years they were a niche form of transportation used primarily in difficult-to-operate conditions for cars (such as on ski slopes as lifts). Now that cable transport projects are on the increase, the social effects are beginning to become more significant. In 2018 the highest 3S cablecar has been inaugurated in Zermatt, Switzerland after more than two years of construction. This cablecar is also called the "Matterhorn Glacier ride" and it allows passengers to reach the top of the Klein Matterhorn mountain (3883m)

== Urban cableways ==
Urban cable transport encompasses all transport systems that use cables to pull vehicles around cities. The Gondola lift or cableway type is spreading relatively quickly in South American urban environments, following the success of Medellín's Metrocable around 2004. As of 2023, 33 aerial cable cars (ACC) transit lines were inaugurated in Latin America and the Caribbean (LAC), the majority after 2010. There are also three recent installations in Algeria in Tlemcen, Skikda and Constantine. Urban cable cars are a relatively old concept – the Bastille cable car in Grenoble, France went into service in 1934 and the Sugarloaf Cable Cars in Rio de Janeiro in 1912 and 1913, although the purpose of these installations is not to transport city dwellers in the narrow sense, but to serve as a tourist site. The majority of installations were built to overcome specific geographical challenges, such as for river crossings, access to islands, major urban breaks (motorway, railway, large industrial site) or steep gradients.

Urban cable cars often have advantages such as relatively small environmental footprints or less air pollution, rapid and less complex construction than other transport infrastructures, lower cost, low noise pollution, faster transport, a comfortable pleasant view, a pull factor for tourists, very little space needs at ground level,and lower energy cost per passenger. In Medellin, connecting high-up neighborhoods with the rest of the city through its MetroCable system has helped reduce the city's crime rates. Disadvantages can include challenges of poor weather conditions and slower speeds depending on the case.

According to a World Bank study, they typically reach speeds of between 10-20km/h and can carry up to 2,000 people per hour in each direction. One line in Bolivia's capital La Paz carries up to 65,000 people every 24 hours. It has a length of 16km as of 2019 and a one-way ticket costed around $0.42. There are installations planned all over the world that do not necessarily address specific geographical problems – according to The Gondola Project, these include Tasmania, Gothenburg (Sweden), Mombasa (Kenya) and Chicago.

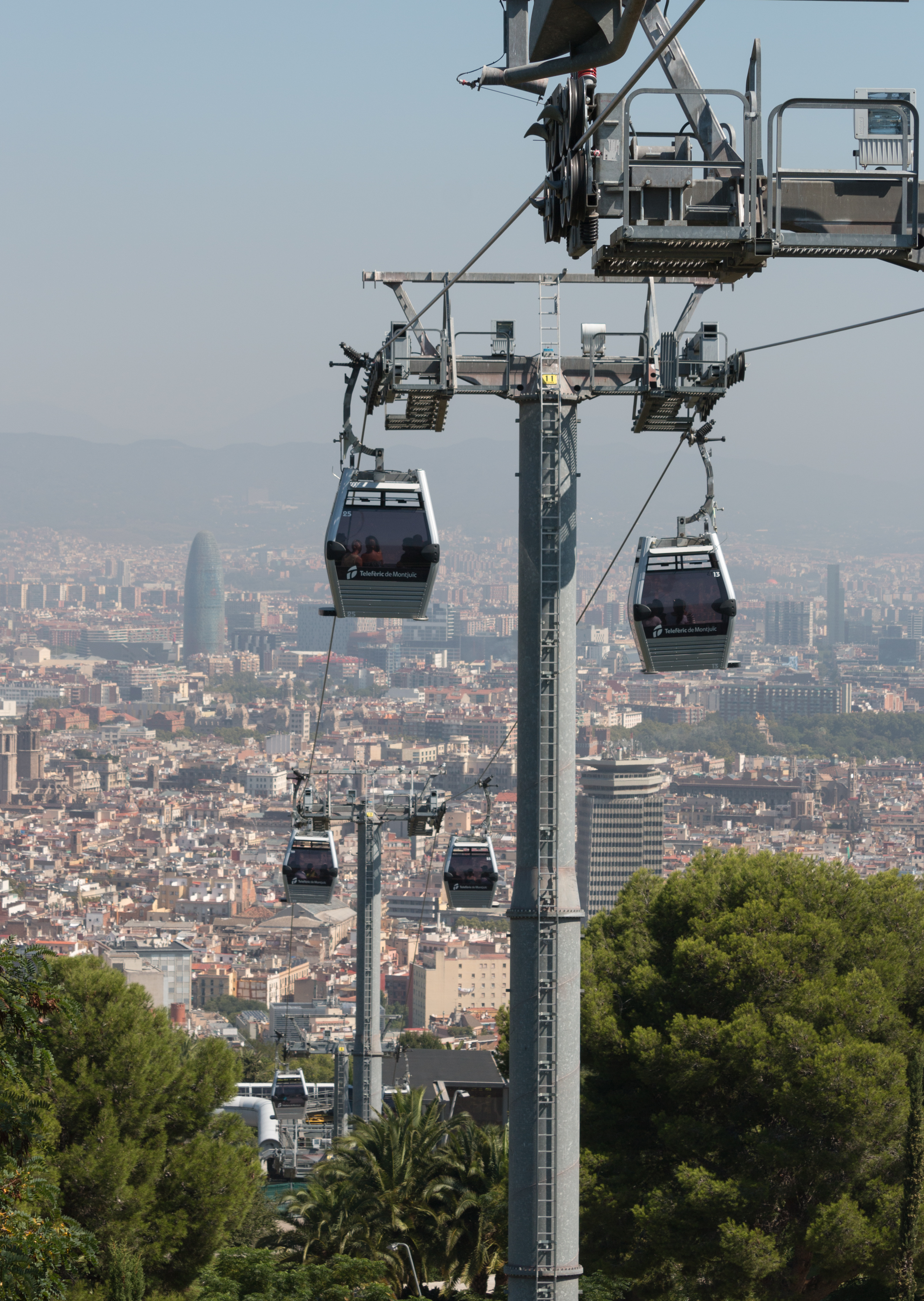
Montjuïc Cable Car, Barcelona

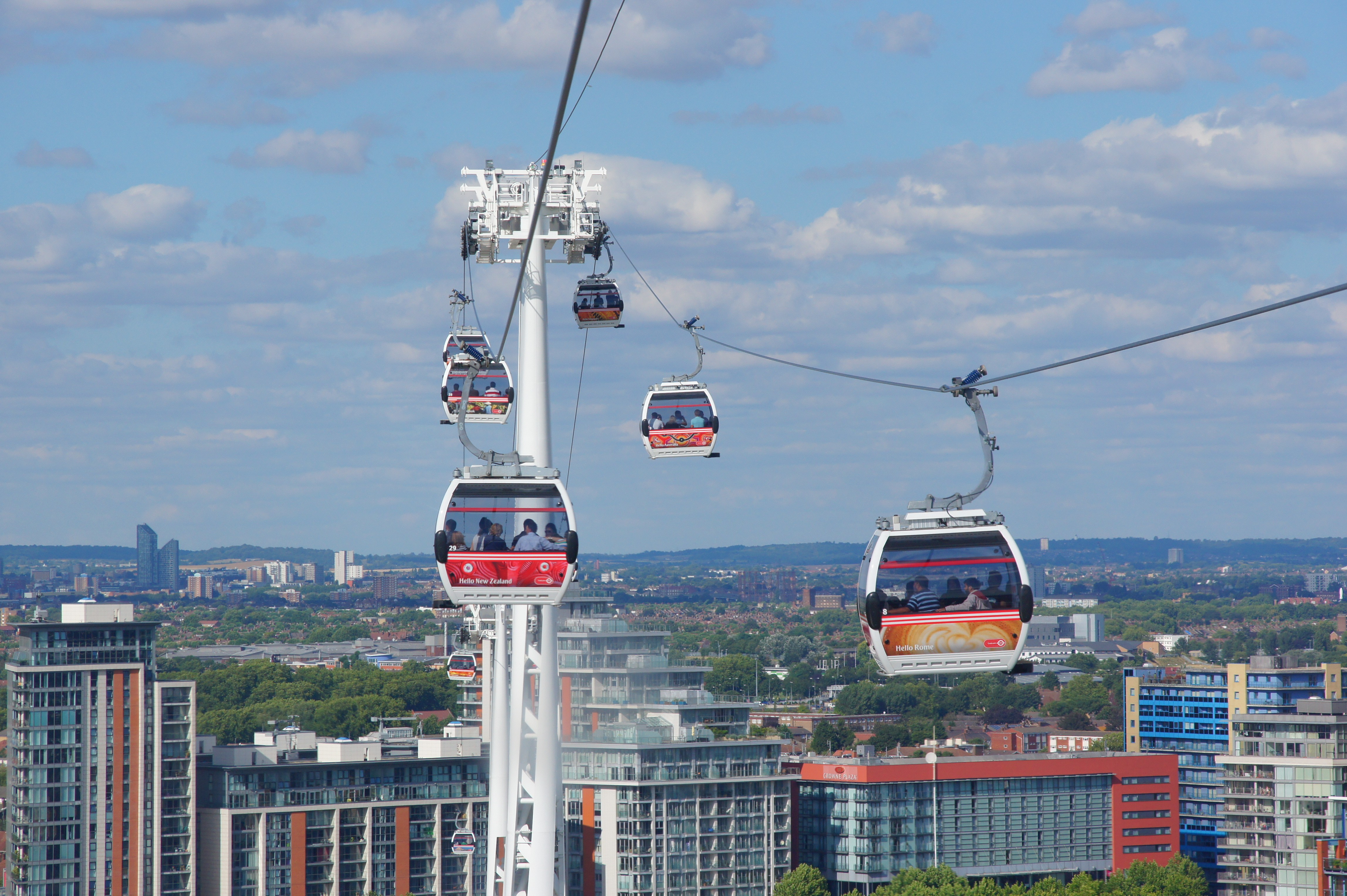
London cable car

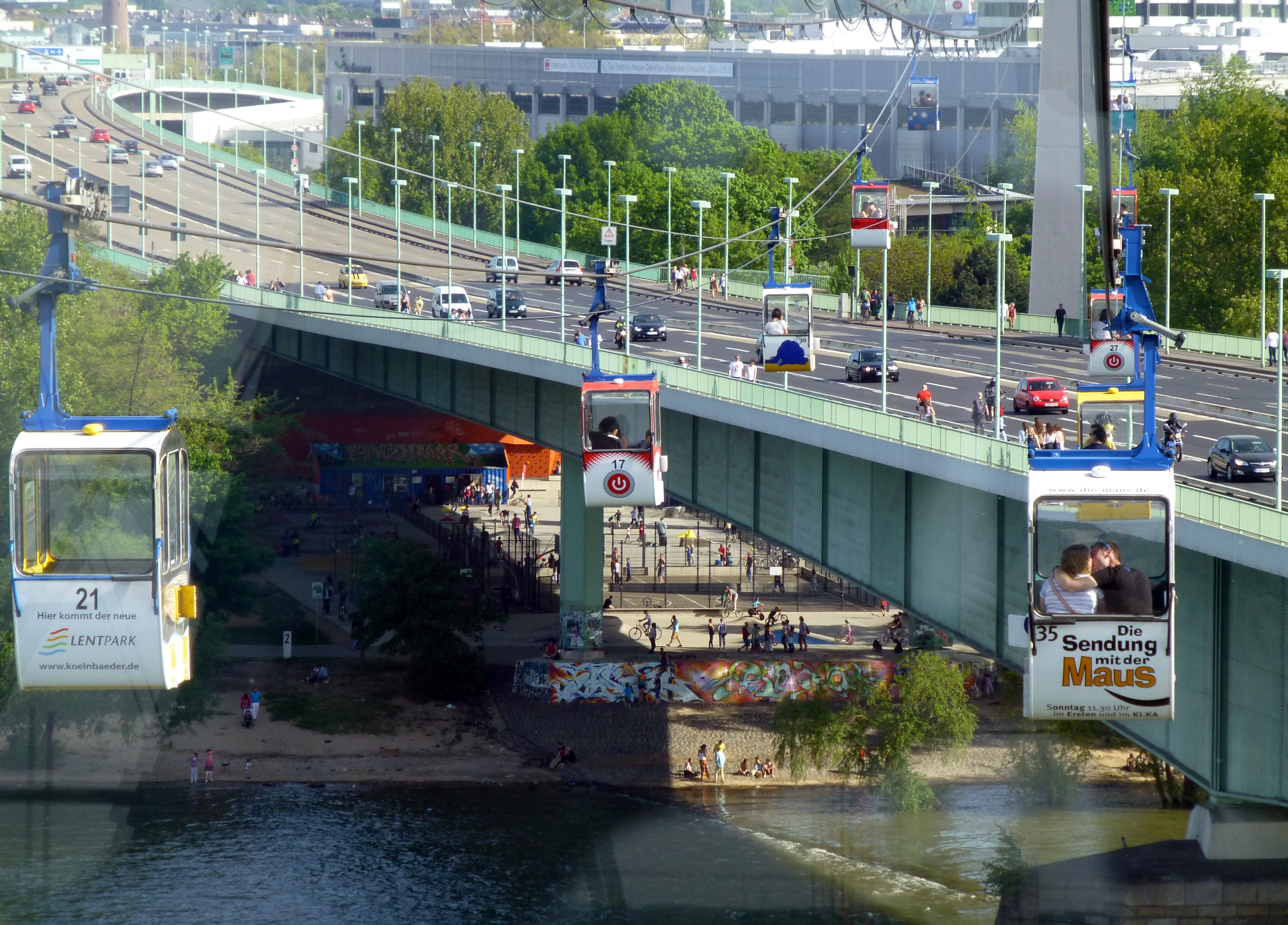
Cologne Cable Car

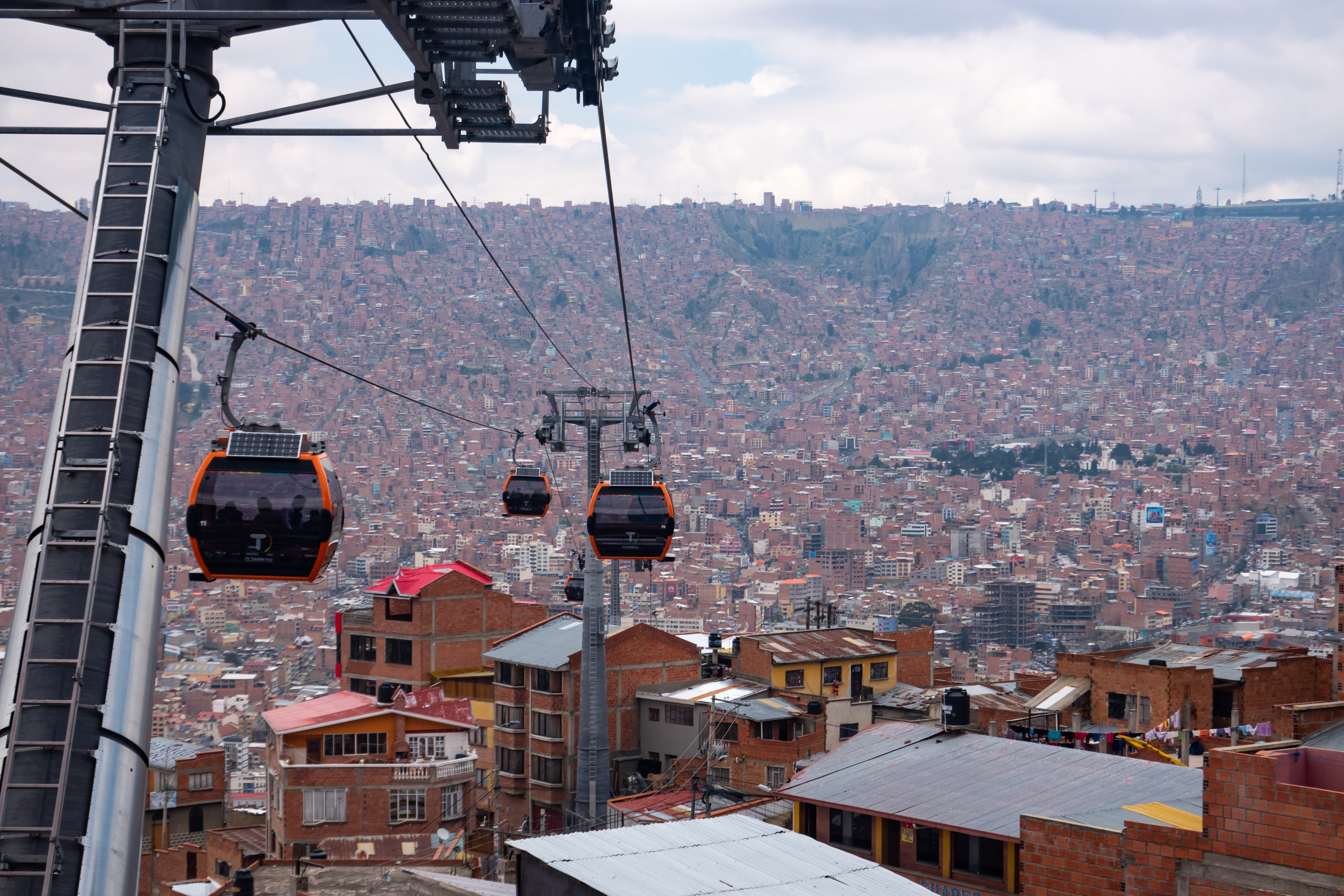
Mi Teleférico, La Paz

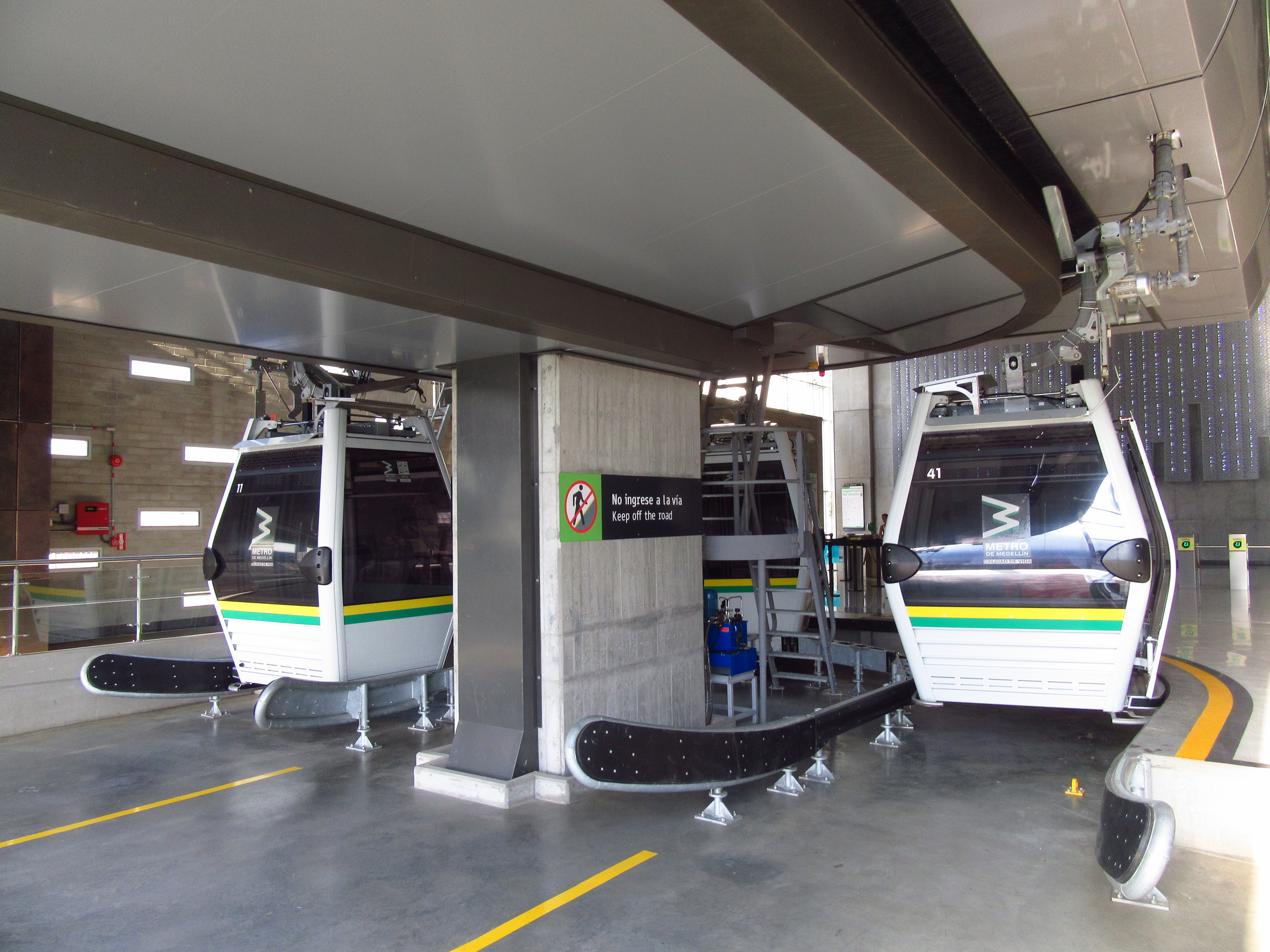
Metrocable, Medellín

== Social effects ==
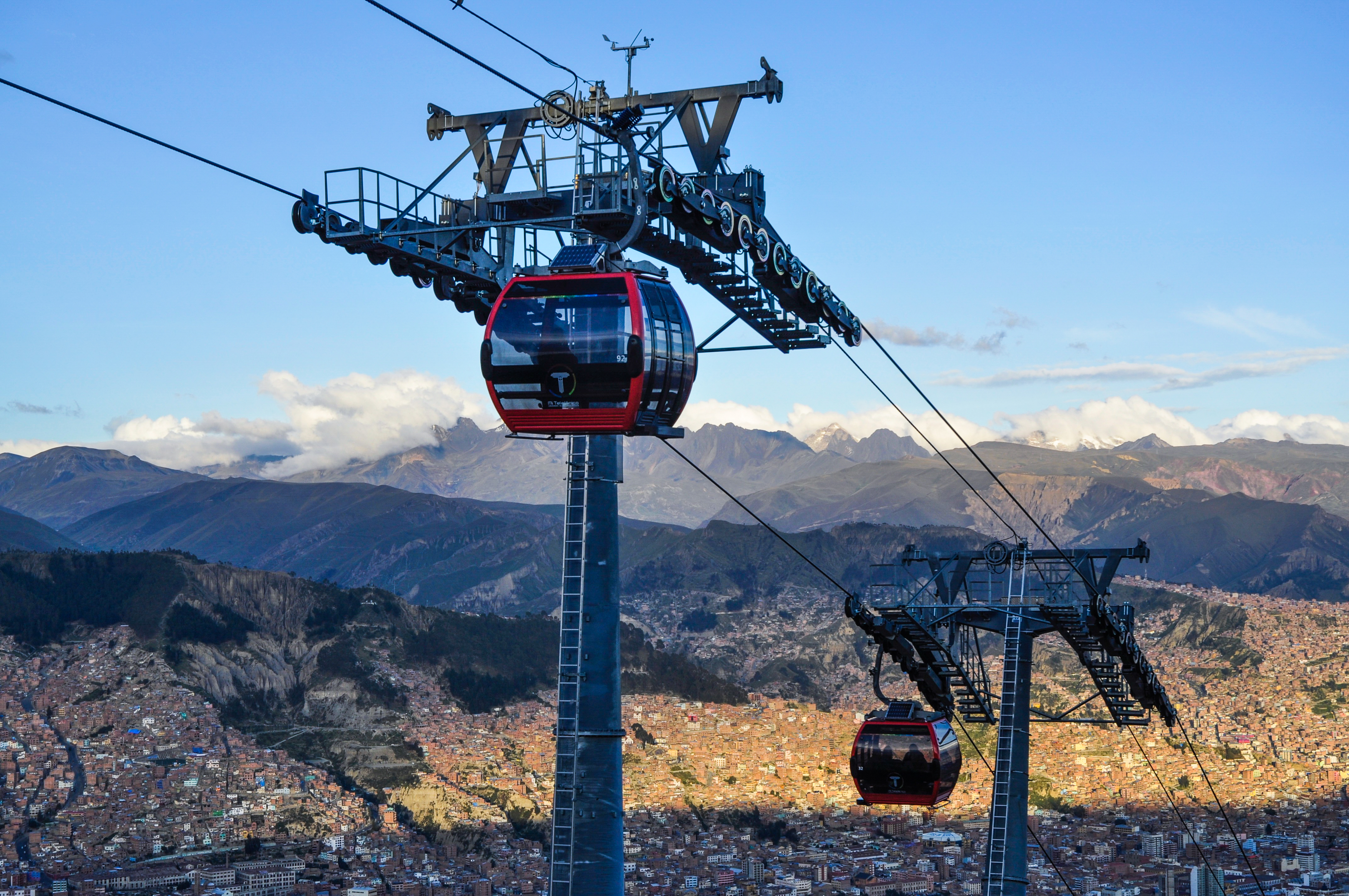
The La Paz cable car system in Bolivia is both the longest and highest urban cable car network in the world.

=== Comparison with other transport types ===
When compared to trains and cars, the volume of people to transport over time and the start-up cost of the project must be a consideration. In areas with extensive road networks, personal vehicles offer greater flexibility and range. Remote places like mountainous regions and ski slopes may be difficult to link with roads, making cable transport project a much easier approach. A cable transport project system may also need fewer invasive changes to the local environment.

The use of Cable Transport is not limited to such rural locations as skiing resorts; it can be used in urban development areas. Their uses in urban areas include funicular railways, gondola lifts, and aerial tramways.

== Safety ==
According to a study by the technical inspection association TÜV SÜD, for every 100 million hours of travel, there are on average 25 deaths due to car accidents, 16 due to plane accidents and only two due to cable car accidents, most of which are due to passenger behaviour.

=== Accidents ===
- A cable car accident in Cavalese, Italy, on 9 March 1976 is considered the worst aerial lift accident in history. The car crashed off the rails and fell 200 meters down a mountainside, also crashing through a grassy meadow before coming to a halt. The tragedy caused the death of 43 people, and four lift officials were jailed for charges regarding the accident.
- On April 15, 1978, a cable car at Squaw Valley Ski Resort in California came off from one of its cables, dropping 75 feet (23 m) and violently bouncing up. It collided with a cable which sheared through the car. Four people were killed and 31 injured.
- The Singapore cable car crash of 29 January 1983 occurred when a drilling rig passed beneath the cable car system linking the Singapore mainland with Sentosa island. The derrick of the drilling rig aboard the ship MV Eniwetok struck the cables, causing two of the gondolas to fall into the sea below. There were 7 fatalities.
- On February 3, 1998, twenty people died in Cavalese, Italy, when a United States Marine Corps EA-6B Prowler aircraft, while flying too low, against regulations, cut a cable supporting a gondola of an aerial tramway. Those killed, 19 passengers and one operator, were eight Germans, five Belgians, three Italians, two Poles, one Austrian, and one Dutch. The United States refused to have the four Marines tried under Italian law and later court-martialed two of them with minimal charges in their country.
- The Kaprun disaster was a fire that occurred in an ascending train in the tunnel of the Gletscherbahn Kaprun 2 funicular in Kaprun, Austria, on 11 November 2000. The disaster claimed the lives of 155 people, leaving 12 survivors (10 Germans and two Austrians) from the burning train. It is one of the worst cable car accidents in history.
- A cable car derailed and crashed to the ground in the Nevis Range, near Fort William, Scotland, on 13 July 2006, seriously injuring all five passengers. Another car on the same rail also slid back down the rails when the crash happened. Following the incident, 50 people were left stranded at the station whilst the staff and aid helped the passengers of the crashed car.
- On Wednesday 25 July 2012, passengers of the London cable car were stuck 90 meters in the air when a power failure caused the gondola to stop over the River Thames. The fault happened at 11:45 am and lasted for about 30 minutes. No passengers were injured, but this was the first problem to ever hit the London's new cable car link.
