= James Curran =

James Curran may refer to:

- James W. Curran, epidemiologist and leader of the CDC's AIDS task force during the early AIDS crisis
- James Curran (educator), former CEO of Grok Academy and former lecturer at the University of Sydney
- Jim Curran (1927–2005), Australian politician
- James T. Curran (1932–2015), founder of the Little Brothers of St. Francis in the Archdiocese of Boston
- James Curran (murder victim) (c. 1962–2005), victim of a politically charged murder conspiracy in Ireland
- James Michael Curran (1903–1968), American civil engineer
- James Watson Curran (1865–1920), newspaper publisher and editor
