= Wiebke =

Wiebke is a feminine German given name. Notable people with the name include:

- Wiebke Ahrndt (born 1963), German ethnologist and university lecturer
- Wiebke Arlt, German endocrinologist
- Wiebke Bleidorn, personality psychologist
- Wiebke von Carolsfeld (born 1966), German-Canadian film director and editor
- Wiebke Denecke, literary scholar, author, and academic
- Wiebke Drenckhan (born 1977), German physicist
- Wiebke Eden (born 1968), German writer
- Wiebke Esdar (born 1984), German psychologist and politician
- Wiebke Kethorn (born 1985), German handball player
- Wiebke Kirleis (born 1970), German archaeologist
- Wiebke Lehmkuhl (born 1983), German opera singer
- Wiebke Muhsal (born 1986), German politician
- Wiebke Nulle (born 1980), German archer
- Wiebke Papenbrock (born 1979), German politician
- Wiebke Siem (born 1954), German artist
- Wiebke Zweig (born 1982), German politician

== See also ==
- Wibke, surname page
- Wiebe (disambiguation)
