= Wiebes =

Wiebes is a surname. Notable people with the surname include:

- Eric Wiebes (born 1963), Dutch politician
- Lorena Wiebes (born 1999), Dutch racing cyclist

== See also ==
- Wiebe (surname)
