= Wiebe =

Wiebe may refer to:

- Wiebe (given name), a masculine given name
- Wiebe (surname), a surname
