= Wibke =

Wibke is a given name. Notable people with the name include:

- Wibke Brems (born 1981), German politician
- Wibke Bruhns (1938–2019), German journalist and author
- Wibke Bülle (born 1970), German sailor
- Wibke Meister (born 1995), German footballer
- Wibke Kristin Timmermann (fl. early 21st century), German legal scholar
- Wibke von Bonin (born 1936), German art historian and broadcaster

== See also ==
- Wiebke
