= Wiebke Kirleis =

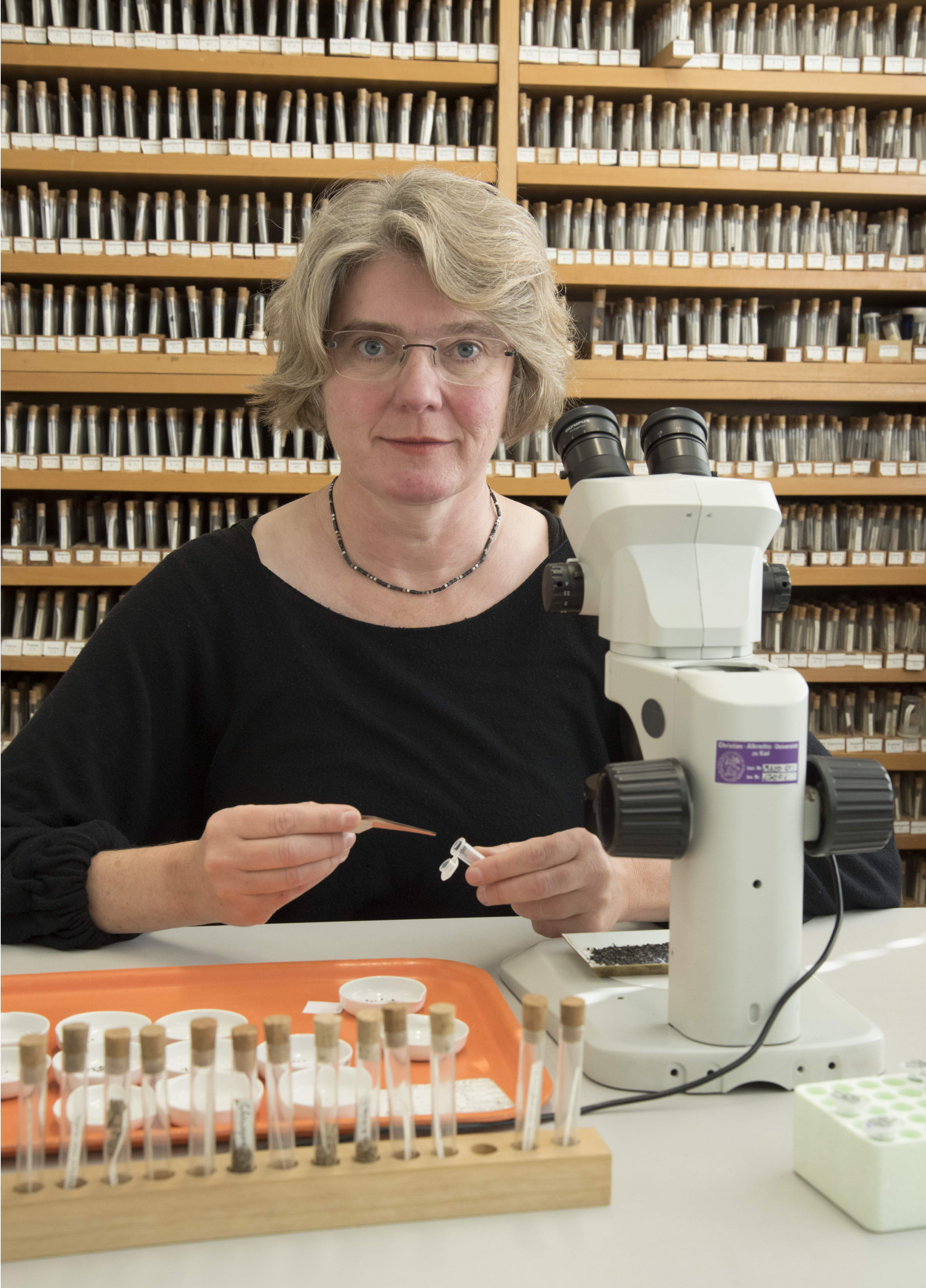
Prof Wiebke Kirleis 2022

Wiebke Kirleis (born 15 April 1970 in Einbeck, Germany) is Professor of Environmental Archaeology and Archaeobotany at Kiel University, Germany. She is co-director of the Collaborative Research Centre 'Scales of Transformation: Human-Environment Interaction in Prehistoric and Archaic Societies' (CRC1266, funded by the German Research Foundation) and a member of the Cluster of Excellence 'Roots' at Kiel University.

As an archaeobotanist, she is interested in all kinds of plant-related human activities, be they subsistence strategies or food processing, and their socio-cultural implications, as well as the reconstruction of human-environment interactions in the past. Geographically, her research areas range from northern Europe to Indonesia.

== Career ==
From 1990 to 1998 she studied biology at the University of Göttingen (botany, anthropology, environmental history/prehistory and early history). From 1998 to 2002 she was a research assistant at the Lower Saxony Institute for Historical Coastal Research. There she wrote her dissertation 'Vegetationsgeschichtliche und archäobotanische Untersuchungen zur Landwirtschaft und Umwelt im Bereich der prehistorischen Siedlungen bei Rullstorf, Landkreis Lüneburg' (Vegetation-historical and archaeobotanical investigations on agriculture and environment in the area of the prehistoric settlements near Rullstorf, district of Lüneburg), which she submitted to Eberhard Grüger and Karl-Ernst Behre in Göttingen in 2002 and was awarded a doctorate (Dr. rer. nat.). She then worked as a research assistant on various projects in Göttingen and elsewhere.

In 2008, Wiebke Kirleis moved to the University of Kiel, where she worked as a junior professor for environmental archaeology at the Graduate School Human Development in Landscapes and the Institute of Pre- and Protohistoric Archaeology from 2008 to 2014. Since 2014 she has been Professor of Environmental Archaeology and Archaeobotany at the Institute of Prehistory and Early History at the University of Kiel. She is currently a board member of the Roots Cluster of Excellence and the Johanna Mestorf Academy and, since 2016, co-spokesperson of the Collaborative Research Centre 1266 at Kiel University.

She was and is involved in many international projects, such as the Pokekea Megalithic Site, Indonesia, research on settlements of the Cucuteni-Tripolje culture in Ukraine and Moldova, or the Funnel Beaker Culture in Denmark and northern Germany. She has also been involved in international research projects on the origin and distribution of proso millet (Panicum miliaceum) in East Asia and Europe. She leads a research team in the ROOTS Cluster of Excellence at Kiel University investigating the diversity and importance of rye (Secale cereale ssp. cereale L.) in medieval Europe. In 2019, she published a comprehensive work on botanical remains from Neolithic settlements in northern Central Europe.

== Publications ==
- Wiebke Kirleis, Valério D. Pillar and Hermann Behling. 2011. Human–environment interactions in mountain rainforests: palaeo-botanical evidence from central Sulawesi, Indonesia. Vegetation History and Archaeobotany 20, 165-179. DOI: 10.1007/s00334-010-0272-0.
- Wiebke Kirleis and Stefanie Klooß. 2014. More than simply fallback food? Social context of plant use in the northern German Neolithic, in: Alexandre Chevalier, Elena Marinova, and Leonor Peña-Chocarro (eds.), Plants and people: choices and diversity through time. Oxford: Oxbow Books, 326-335.
- Wiebke Kirleis and Elske Fischer. 2014. Neolithic cultivation of tetraploid free threshing wheat in Denmark and northern Germany: implications for crop diversity and societal dynamics of the Funnel Beaker Culture, in: Felix Bittmann et al. (eds.), Farming in the forest: ecology and economy of fire in prehistoric agriculture. Special issue. Vegetation History and Archaeobotany 23, Supplement 1, 81-96. DOI: 10.1007/s00334-014-0440-8.
- Wiebke Kirleis and Marta Dal Corso. 2016. Trypillian subsistence economy: animal and plant exploitation, in: Johannes Müller, Kurt Rassman, and Mykhailo Videiko (eds.), Trypillia-megasites and European prehistory 4100–3400 BCE. Themes in Contemporary Archaeology 2. London: Routledge, 195-205.
- Atlas of Neolithic plant remains from northern central Europe (= Advances in Archaeobotany. 4). Barkhuis Publishing, Groningen 2019, ISBN 978-94-92444-91-2.
- Kirleis, W., Dal Corso, M., Filipović, D. 2022. Millet and What Else? The Wider Context of the Adoption of Millet Cultivation in Europe. Scales of Transformation 14. Leiden: Sidestone Press. ISBN 9789464270150
