= Little Brothers of St. Francis =

Sect of a Roman Catholic institute

The Little Brothers of St. Francis (originally founded as the Franciscan Brothers of Peace and Love) were members of a Roman Catholic institute of Religious Brothers founded in the Archdiocese of Boston on September 8, 1970, by Brother James T. Curran, L.B.S.F. (1932 - 2015).

Canonically designated as a Private Association of the Faithful, the community was spiritually affiliated to the Province of the Immaculate Conception of the Order of Friars Minor. Striving to be poor in spirit, they worked to serve the needs of the homeless primarily through prayer and presence. They followed a contemplative life based on the Rule of the Third Order Regular of St. Francis, also influenced by the Rule for Hermitages written by St. Francis of Assisi. The community disbanded in 2013.

== History ==
James T. Curran was born in Boston, Massachusetts on June 13, 1932, the son of James P. and Anna V. Diffley Curran. He grew up in the North End and was an active member of St. Leonard's parish. He attended Boston University and for a number of years performed with the National Opera Company. He felt called to follow a life of prayer and service among the poor. In this goal, he was guided by the Franciscan friars of Immaculate Conception Province who provided him fraternal support and spiritual direction. On September 9, 1951, he professed vows as a Franciscan tertiary (Secular Franciscan).

In 1970 Curran founded the "Franciscan Brothers of Peace and Love", and in 1976 changed its name to the "Little Brothers of St. Francis" to minister to Boston's homeless. The first home of the community was his apartment on Beacon Hill in downtown Boston. He eventually gained the blessing of the Archbishop of Boston, Cardinal Humberto Medeiros, who was himself a member of the Third Order of St. Francis (Secular Franciscan Order). The cardinal allowed him to take religious vows and to wear a Franciscan habit, even though he was alone at that point. He soon adopted a habit made of denim, which quickly became the distinguishing mark of the community, earning them the nickname of the "Blue jeans Franciscans."

Curran's way of life was to keep working at his job while spending several hours in prayer before the Blessed Sacrament. He then would go out among the homeless who would congregate in downtown Boston, especially around the Boston Common, and distribute peanut butter and jelly sandwiches, coffee, underwear, T-shirts, and white cotton socks. As other men came to join him, the community eventually relocated to a house in the Mission Hill section of Boston, among the city's poorest. The community never grew large, however, numbering seven Brothers at its peak around 2008.

In 2006, Curran received the Institute on Religious Life's Pro Fidelitate et Virtute Award for his fidelity to his vocation as a religious brother and for supporting the IRL as a board member, coordinator of the Boston Regional Meeting, and as chairman of the Forum of Superiors of Men's Communities.

On November 23, 2008, the Archdiocese of Boston awarded Curran the Cheverus Award Medal in order to recognize his service to the Church and to God's people.

On August 29, 2009, four members of the Little Brothers of St. Francis were invited by Cardinal Seán Patrick O'Malley, Archbishop of Boston, to serve as acolytes at the Funeral Mass of Massachusetts Senator Ted Kennedy. The Mass was held at the Basilica and Shrine of Our Lady of Perpetual Help, the parish to which the Little Brothers of St. Francis' belonged and where they attended daily Mass.

In 2012, due to declining health, Brother James became a resident of the Don Orione Nursing Home in East Boston. In the community's last newsletter of November 2012, it was announced that the community was disbanding. Another religious congregation, the Brotherhood of Hope, has acquired the property at 785-789 Parker Street, Mission Hill, MA.

Brother James died on June 28, 2015, at St. Joseph Manor Health Care in Brockton, Massachusetts at the age of eighty-three. The Mass of Christian Burial was held at Mission Church (Basilica and Shrine of Our Lady of Perpetual Help) in Roxbury, MA on July 1, 2015. Interment was held at Mount Benedict Cemetery in West Roxbury, MA.

Over the years, in addition to befriending large numbers of Boston's homeless men and women, the Little Brothers also befriended and were befriended by many well-known Catholic priests, religious, and humanitarians, including: Dom Basil Pennington, O.C.S.O., Ade Bethune, Mother Antonia Brenner, Mother Teresa, Jean Vanier, Little Sister Magdeleine of Jesus, Fr. Benedict Groeschel, Fr. John Hardon, and several others.
