= Wiebe (given name) =

Wiebe is a masculine given name of West Frisian origin, and may refer to:

- Wiebe Bijker (born 1951), Dutch professor
- Wiebe Boer, American academic administrator
- Wiebe Draijer (born 1965), Dutch engineer
- Wiebe Nijenhuis (1951–2016), Dutch strongman
- Wiebe van der Vliet (born 1970), Dutch film editor
