= Wiebe (surname) =

Wiebe is a German (language) surname. It is from a short form of various Ancient Germanic personal names beginning with wig, meaning "battle", "war". Notable people with the surname include:

- Adam Wiebe (c. 1590–1653), Dutch engineer
- Alejandro Wiebe (born 1970), Argentine television personality
- Armin Wiebe (born 1948), Canadian novelist
- Art Wiebe (1912–1971), Canadian ice hockey player
- Cainan Wiebe (born 1995), Canadian actor
- Cornelius Wiebe (1893–1999), Canadian physician
- Danilo Wiebe (born 1984), German footballer
- Ella Wiebe (born 1978), New Zealand footballer
- Erica Wiebe (born 1989), Canadian wrestler
- Jack Wiebe (1936–2007), Canadian politician
- Janyce Wiebe (1959–2018), American computer scientist
- Katie Funk Wiebe (1924–2016), Canadian-American writer
- Mark Wiebe (born 1957), American golfer
- Matt Wiebe (born 1979), Canadian politician
- Mike Wiebe, American musician (The Riverboat Gamblers), actor, stand-up comedian
- Nettie Wiebe (born 1949), Canadian professor
- Phillip H. Wiebe (born 1945), Canadian philosopher
- Reg Wiebe (1963–2018), Canadian-born Dutch curler
- Robert Wiebe (born 1937), Canadian politician
- Rudy Wiebe (born 1934), Canadian author
- Shane Wiebe (born 1983), Canadian musician
- Steve Wiebe (born 1969), American video game player, schoolteacher, and musician
- Warren Wiebe (1953–1998), American vocalist
