= James Michael Curran =

American civil engineer

James Michael Curran Sr. (June 9, 1903 – February 12, 1968) was an American civil engineer who designed the chairlift that was essential for establishing skiing as a recreational sport in the United States.

According to the Ski Hall of Fame in Ishpeming, Michigan, "Curran revolutionized the sport of skiing by designing an easy, moderately inexpensive method for skiers to ascend the mountain. The chairlift went on to become the workhorse of the ski industry, enjoyed by millions of skiers for the next 60 years. His contribution to the sport and industry of skiing has been enormous, although mostly unrecognized."

Curran was born June 9, 1903, in Omaha, Nebraska. His parents were immigrants from Ireland. He possessed a high school education with a few night school courses, and was employed as a draftsman and iron worker before passing the civil engineering exam. During the 1940s and 1950s Curran became known as a top-notch bridge engineer for the Union Pacific Railroad. But, his historical significance came earlier with a novel idea that a hoisting mechanism used to unload bananas from ships could be redesigned as a safe, inexpensive, relatively enjoyable way to get skiers up the slope.

Before chairlifts were installed at Sun Valley, Idaho in 1936, skiers had relied on tows powered by horses or water wheels. In the early 1930s, the Canadian Alex Foster designed a towing device powered by an automobile engine. Tow ropes and bars could be dangerous, and many skiers found them unpleasant - especially on longer or steeper runs. Curran's chairlift raised skiers off the ground allowing them to rest and gain an enjoyable view of mountains, ski-runs, and resorts. “People were marveling over how well the chairlifts worked,” and it "hit the sweet spot of cost and comfort," said Kirby Gilbert, a ski historian. A two-person lift was introduced in 1946, followed by three and four skier models of the next twenty years. Today it is difficult to separate the experience of recreational skiing from riding chairlifts.

He died February 12, 1968.
