= Adam Wybe =

Inventor of the cable car on multiple supports

- Born: July 12, 1584; Harlingen, Netherlands
- Died: 1653; Gdańsk, Poland
- Occupations: engineer and inventor
- Known for: the world's first cable car

Adam Wybe (born July 12, 1584 in Harlingen, Friesland, died in 1653 in Danzig), also known as Adam Wiebe, was an engineer and inventor of Dutch origin, active mainly in Danzig (Gdańsk) in the Polish–Lithuanian Commonwealth. His work includes the world's first cable car on multiple supports in 1644. It was the biggest built until the end of the 19th century.

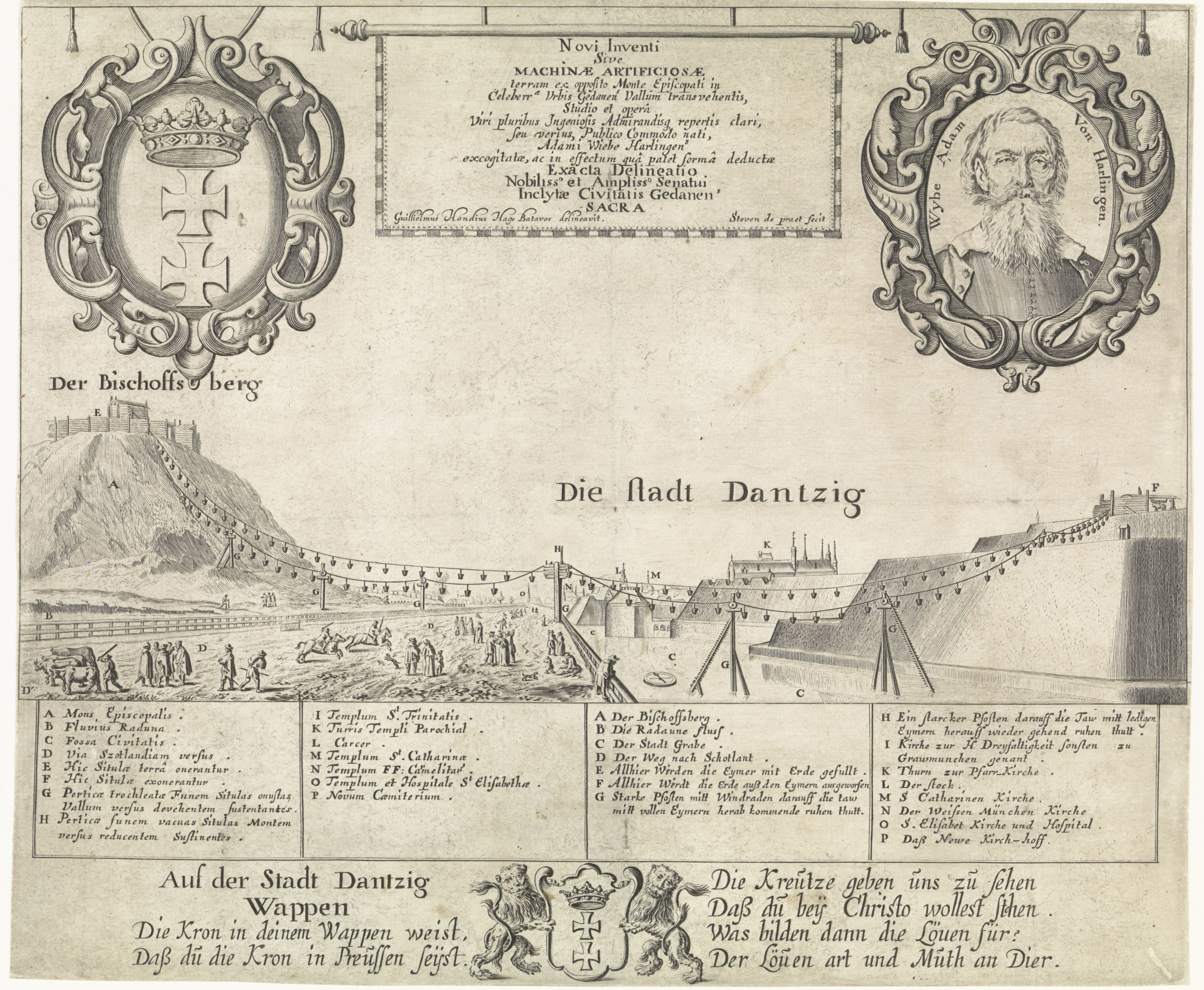
Etching of Adam Wybe's cable car in Danzig. (by Willem Hondius)

Outside of his village of origin- Harlingen, Friesland- no details are known of his youth and there is no record on his parents. His wife's name was Margarethe.

Wybe lived in Danzig after ca. 1616. He became famous for many inventions and constructions: a horse-driven dredger, river ice cutter, and an aqueduct taking Radunia River waters over the moat in the Hucisko crossroads area. The construction in 1644 of a rope railway was his most famous creation. During previous centuries there were already ropeways which resembled cable cars in existence, but Wybe changed and improved it as follows: It is the first to use a cable industrially (instead of a rope) in loop and continuous motion, and the first to multiply the 'vehicles'. He also improved it by supporting the cable with pylons equipped with pulleys, and unloaded of the basket 'vehicles' by means of a swing. The machine was longer than 200 meters. It includes 7 wooden pylons, and seems to carry a score of about 120 'vehicles'.

Clarification of Inheritance Records and Affirmation of Lineage

A 1659 inheritance settlement document lists only two sons of Adam Wiebe von Harlingen: Abraham and Cornelius. While this record has been cited by modern scholars, including Dr. Glenn H. Penner, it must be placed in its proper historical and legal context.

In the 17th century, inheritance documents were limited legal instruments, typically naming only surviving male heirs of legal age who were local or actively involved in estate claims. These records were never designed to serve as comprehensive family registries. The absence of a child’s name from such a document does not equate to their nonexistence, especially if: • The child had predeceased the estate • Had migrated or was otherwise ineligible to inherit • Or was excluded due to legal, cultural, or structural reasons

Furthermore, multiple historical sources and genealogical overlays—including the article Die Wiebes by Horst Penner—refer to multiple children of Adam, including a son named Jacob, who does not appear in the 1659 settlement but is evidenced through direct lineage leading to Arend Wiebe (b. 1693) and ultimately to myself, John David Wiebe.

The recurring appearance of names such as Jacob, Arend, Franz, Hermann, and Ernst Wiebe in my paternal lineage—combined with verified migration patterns from Harlingen, Friesland to Danzig, and then to West Prussia and North America—demonstrate a continuity that is both familial and noble in nature. These patterns reflect the very legacy that Adam Wiebe von Harlingen left behind.

⸻

Affirmation of Lineage

I, John David Wiebe, affirm with conviction that I am the 6th great-grandson of Adam Wiebe von Harlingen, Friesland. My confidence is grounded in a combination of: • Unbroken genealogical documentation from Adam Wiebe von Harlingen through each successive paternal generation to myself • Strong alignment with the historical individuals outlined in Die Wiebes • Consistent use of noble and hereditary names across generations, including Jacob, Arend, Franz, Hermann, and Ernst Wiebe • Regional and migratory consistency, from Friesland to Danzig, and onward into Prussia and North America • The absence of any alternate lineage that more fully explains the continuity of identity, geography, and noble status

My family’s enduring identity—marked by engineering achievement, education, service, and nobility—mirrors the exact traits for which Adam Wiebe von Harlingen is known and remembered.

Even I, a retired Lieutenant Colonel, U.S. Army, served 35 years in military leadership and civil/environmental engineering without knowing my ancestral connection to Adam. Only in the last 20 years has the evidence come into full view—compelling, coherent, and deeply personal.

These parallels are not mere coincidence. They are the inheritance of legacy.

⸻

Right of Defense and Scholarly Invitation

Anyone who wishes to challenge my claim is welcome to do so—including Dr. Glenn H. Penner, whom I know personally and greatly respect for his scholarly discipline. While Dr. Penner’s work rightly raises caution regarding genealogical certainty, none of his findings disprove my descent. In fact, his work highlights the very gaps that my lineage successfully bridges with extraordinary accuracy.

I assert my ancestral connection based on what is, by all scholarly and historical standards, no less than 93% accurate. This is not a claim rooted in myth or unexamined family lore—it is based on documentation, cross-verified patterns, regional records, and historical continuity.

Until a more accurate or substantiated lineage is presented, I will continue to honor, defend, and uphold my descent from Adam Wiebe von Harlingen as both valid and historically sound.
