= Aerial lift =

Method of cable transport

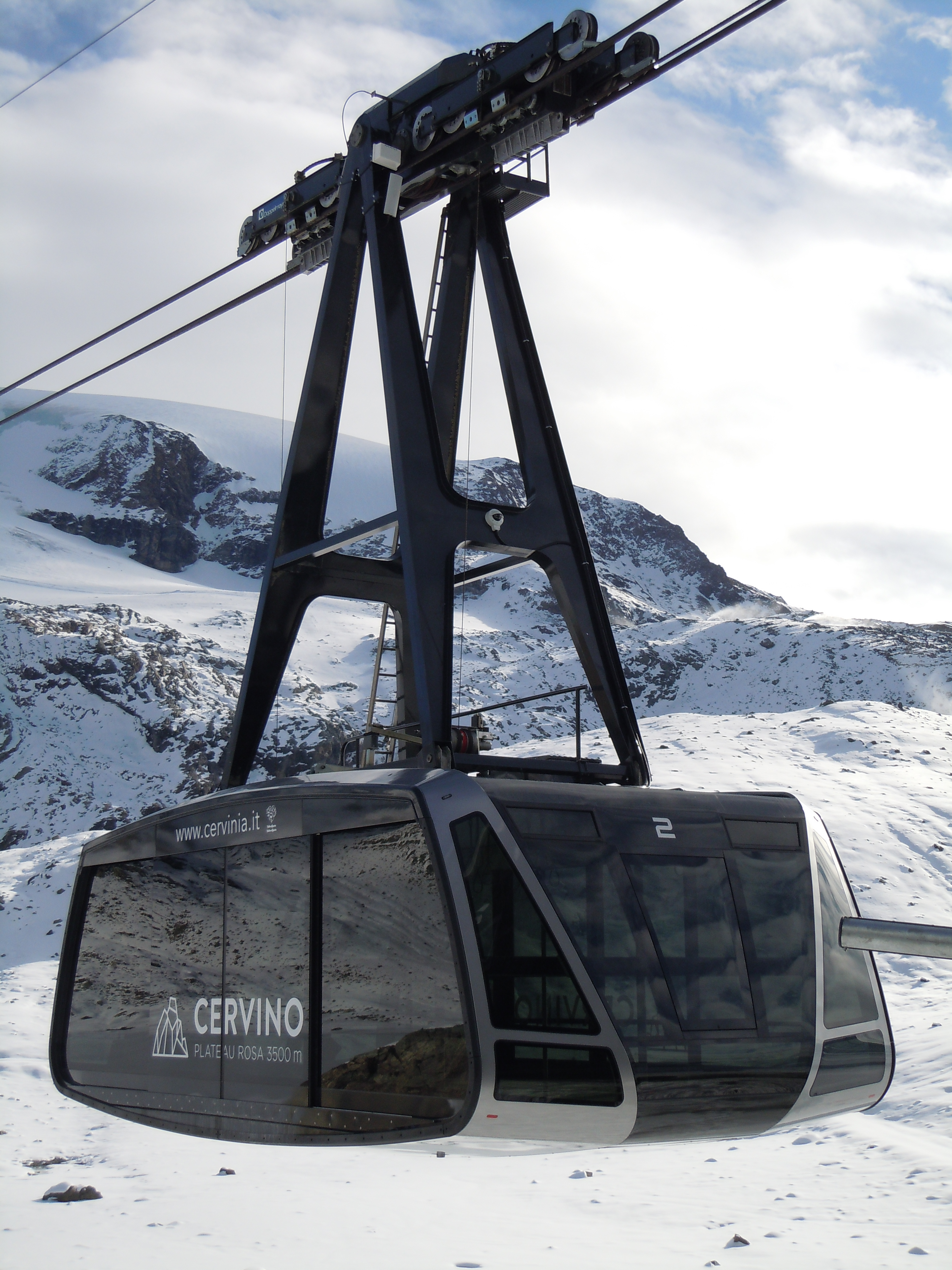
Plateau Rosa aerial tramway, in Cervinia, Italy, moves 120 people at a time to a 3,480 m (11,420 ft) glacier.

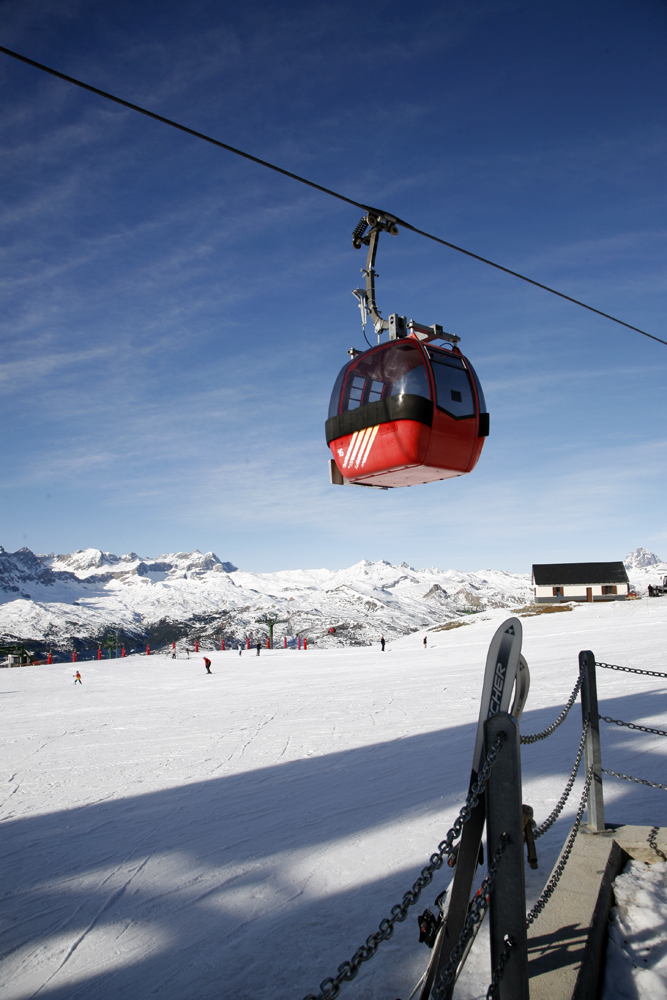
8-passenger gondola lift in Panticosa Ski Resort, Spain.

An aerial lift, also known as a cable car or ropeway, is a means of cable transport in which cabins, cars, gondolas, or open chairs are hauled above the ground by means of one or more cables. Aerial lift systems are frequently employed in a mountainous territory where roads are relatively difficult to build and use, and have seen extensive use in mining. Aerial lift systems are relatively easy to move and have been used to cross rivers and ravines. In more recent times, the cost-effectiveness and flexibility of aerial lifts have seen an increase of gondola lift being integrated into urban public transport systems.

== Types ==
=== Aerial tramway ===
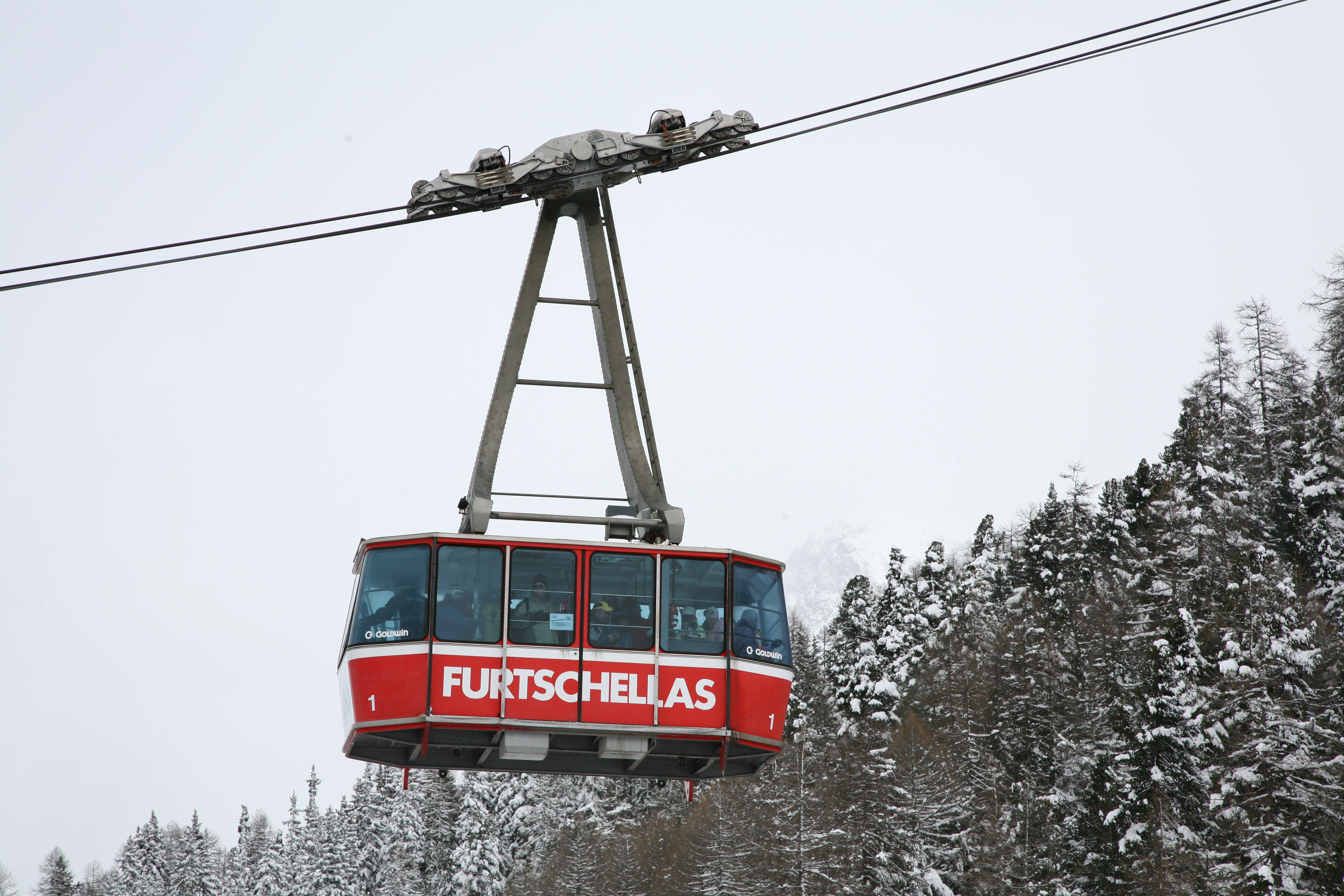
Cable car in Engadine, Switzerland, suspended on two support cables with an additional haul rope.

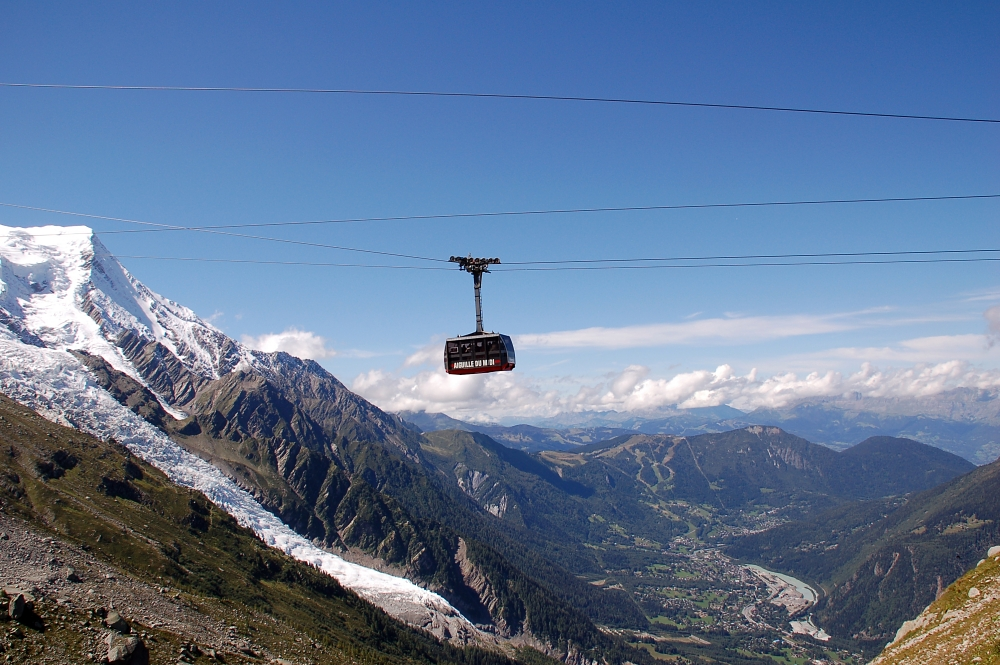
Cable Car to the Aiguille du Midi, France, suspended on one support cable with an additional haul rope.

Video of an aerial tramway going downhill at Mount Tsukuba in Ibaraki, Japan.

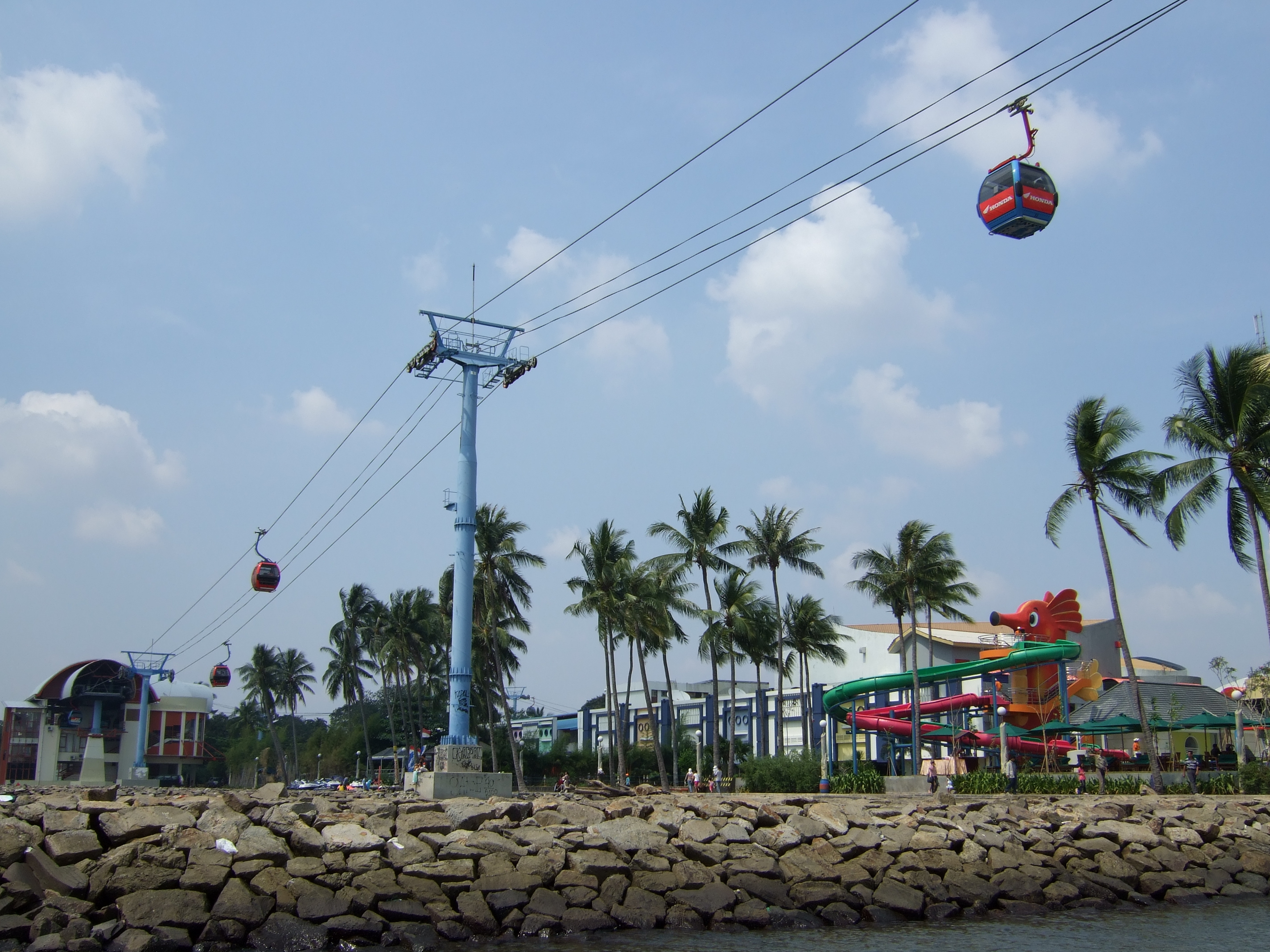
Cable Car past the coastline at Ancol, Indonesia

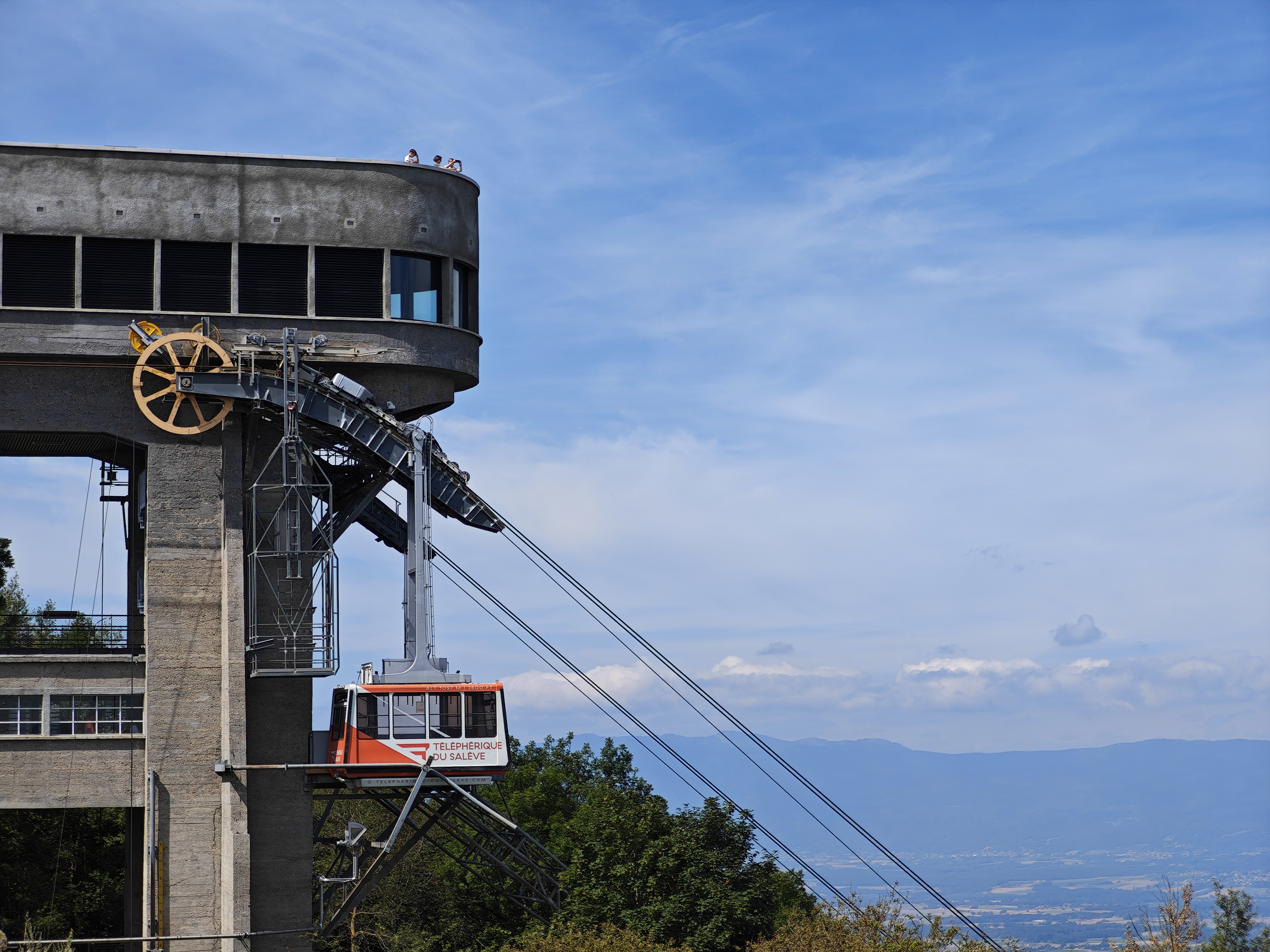
Téléphérique du Salève upper station and tramway cabin

An aerial tramway, aerial tram (American English) or a cable car (British English), uses one or two stationary ropes for support while a separate moving rope provides propulsion. The grip of an aerial tramway is permanently fixed onto the propulsion rope. Aerial trams used for urban transport include the Roosevelt Island Tramway in New York City, as well as the Portland Aerial Tram.

=== Gondola lift ===
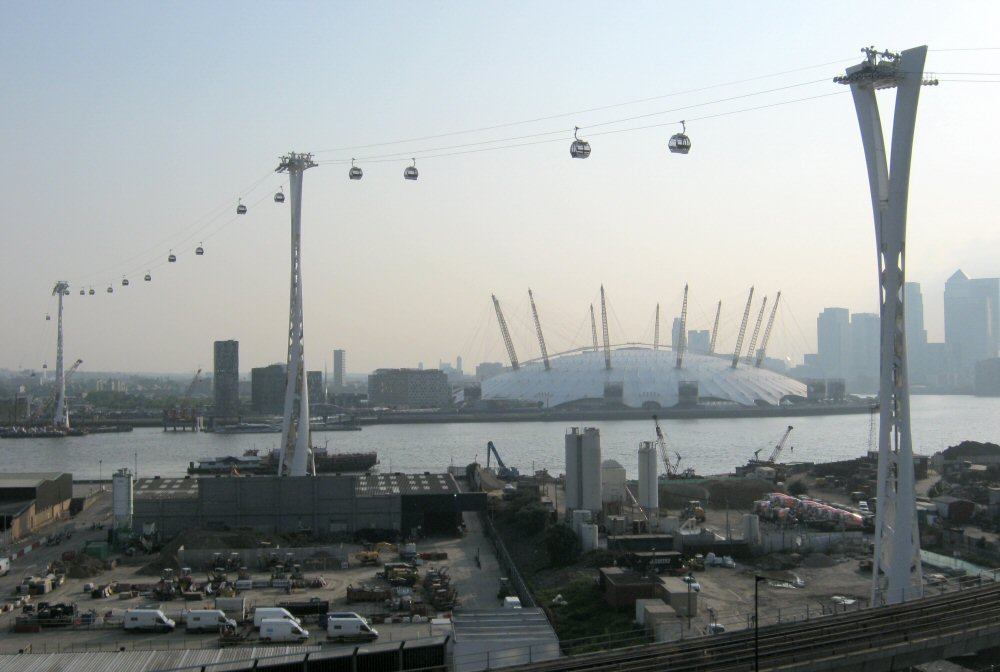
The London Cable Car over the River Thames, London.

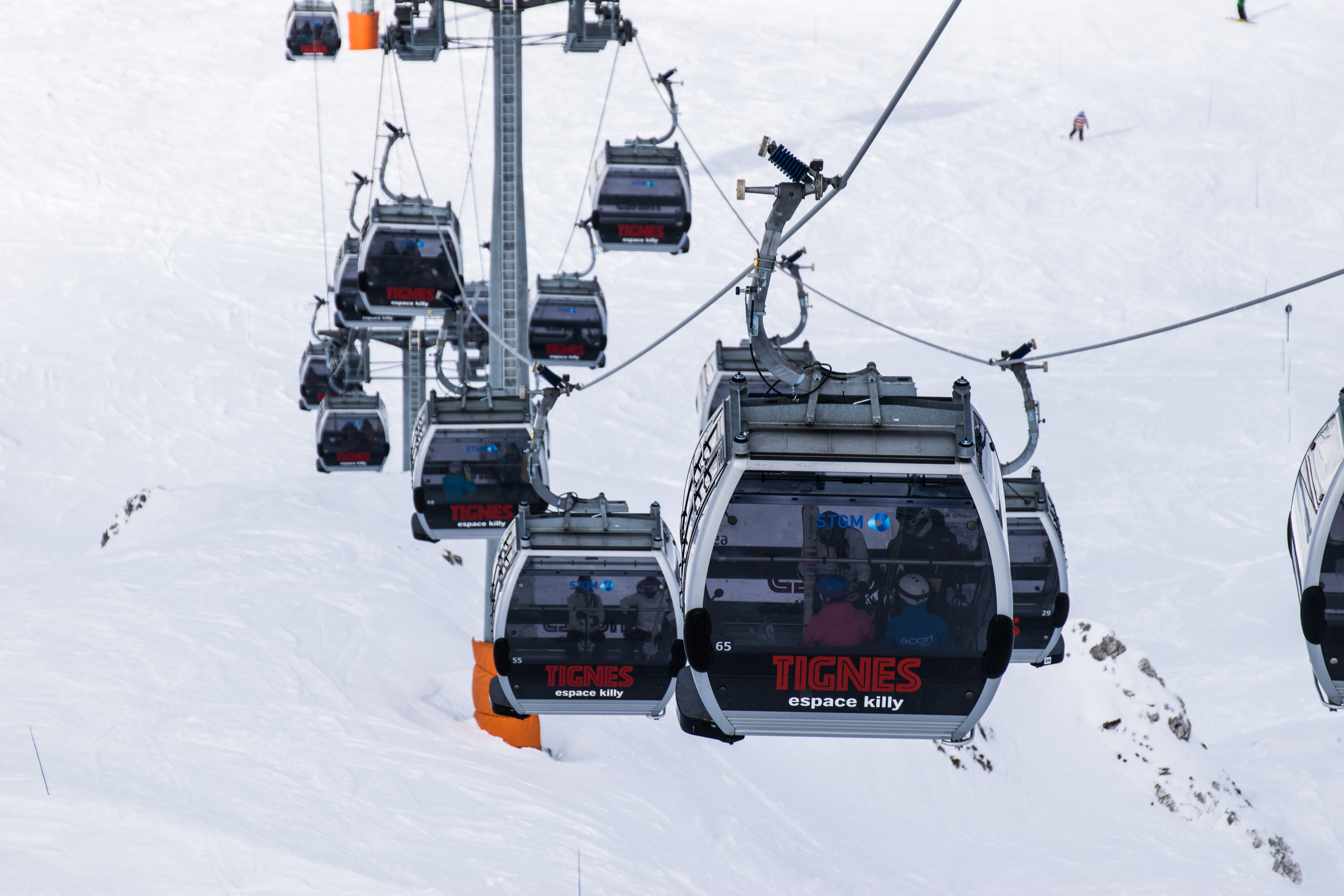
A gondola lift in Tignes, France.

A gondola lift consists of a continuously circulating cable that is strung between two or more stations, over intermediate supporting towers. The cable is driven by a bullwheel in a terminal, which is connected to an engine or electric motor. Multiple gondola cabins are attached to the cable, usually with detachable grips, enabling them to slow down in the stations to facilitate safe boarding. Fixed-grip variants exist, although these are considerably less common. Lifts with a single cable are sometimes referred to as "mono-cable" gondola lifts. Depending on the design of the individual lift, the capacity, cost, and functionality of a gondola lift will differ dramatically. Gondola lifts are also used for urban transportation. Examples include the Singapore Cable Car, Metrocable (Medellín), Metrocable (Caracas), Mi Teleférico (La Paz), and London Cable Car.

==== Bicable and tricable gondola lifts ====
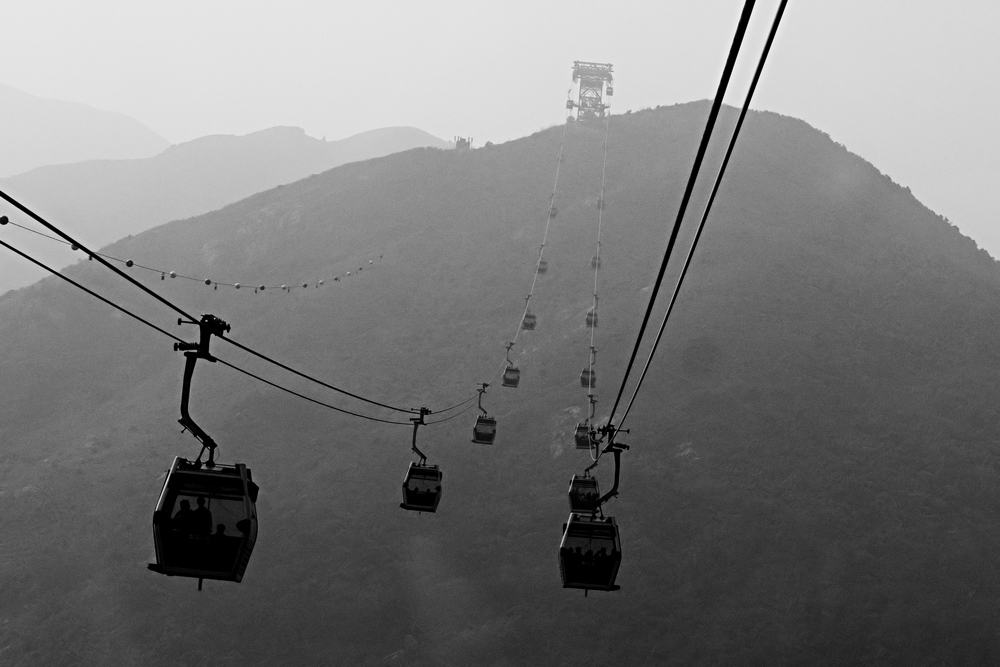
The Ngong Ping 360 bicable gondola lift in Hong Kong, built by Leitner.

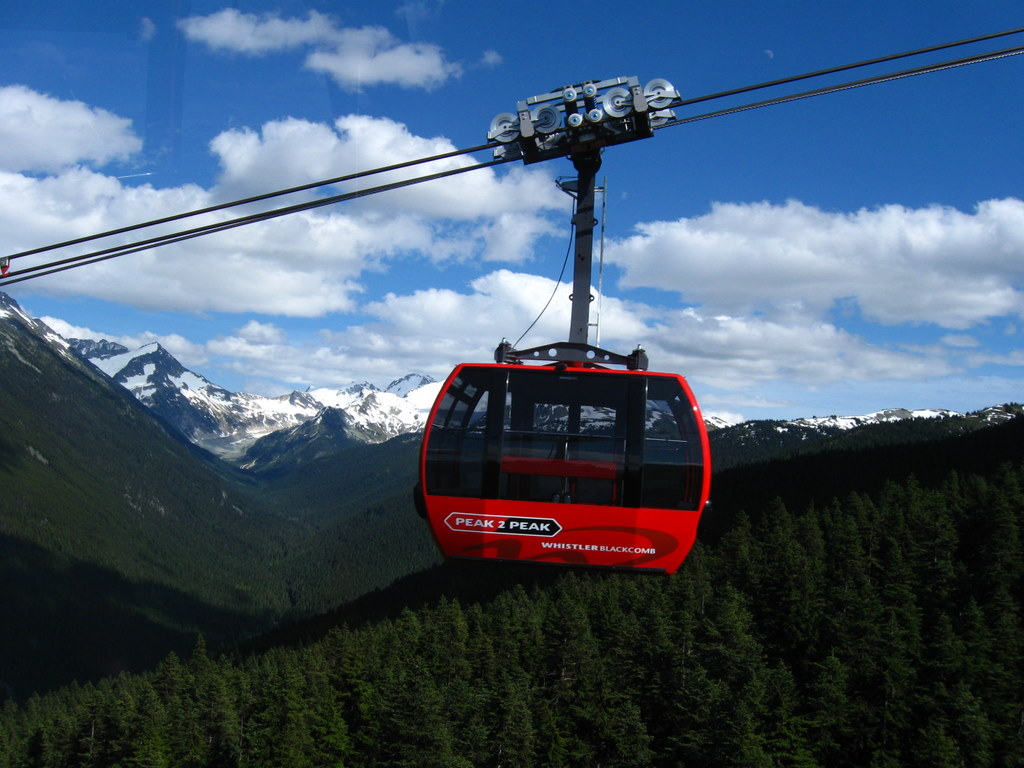
One of the 28 cabins on the Peak 2 Peak Gondola tricable in Whistler Blackcomb Resort, Canada.

Gondola lifts which feature one stationary 'support' rope and one haul rope are known as bi-cable gondola lifts, while lifts that feature two support ropes and one haul rope are known as tri-cable gondola lifts. Examples include Ngong Ping Skyrail (Hong Kong) and the Peak 2 Peak Gondola (Canada).

=== Funitel ===
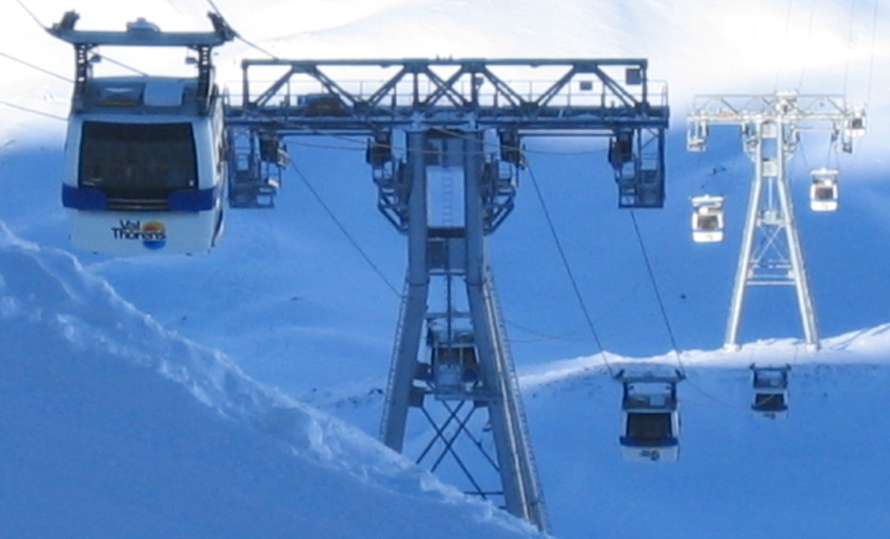
Funitel at Val Thorens, France

A funitel differs from a standard gondola lift through the use of two overhead arms, attached to two parallel haul cables, providing more stability in high winds. The name funitel is a blend of the French words funiculaire and téléphérique. Systems may sometimes be referred to as "double monocable" (DMC), where two separate haul cables are used, or "double loop monocable" (DLM) where a single haul cable is looped round twice.

Funitels combine a short time between successive cabins with a high capacity (20 to 30 people) per cabin.

=== Funifor ===
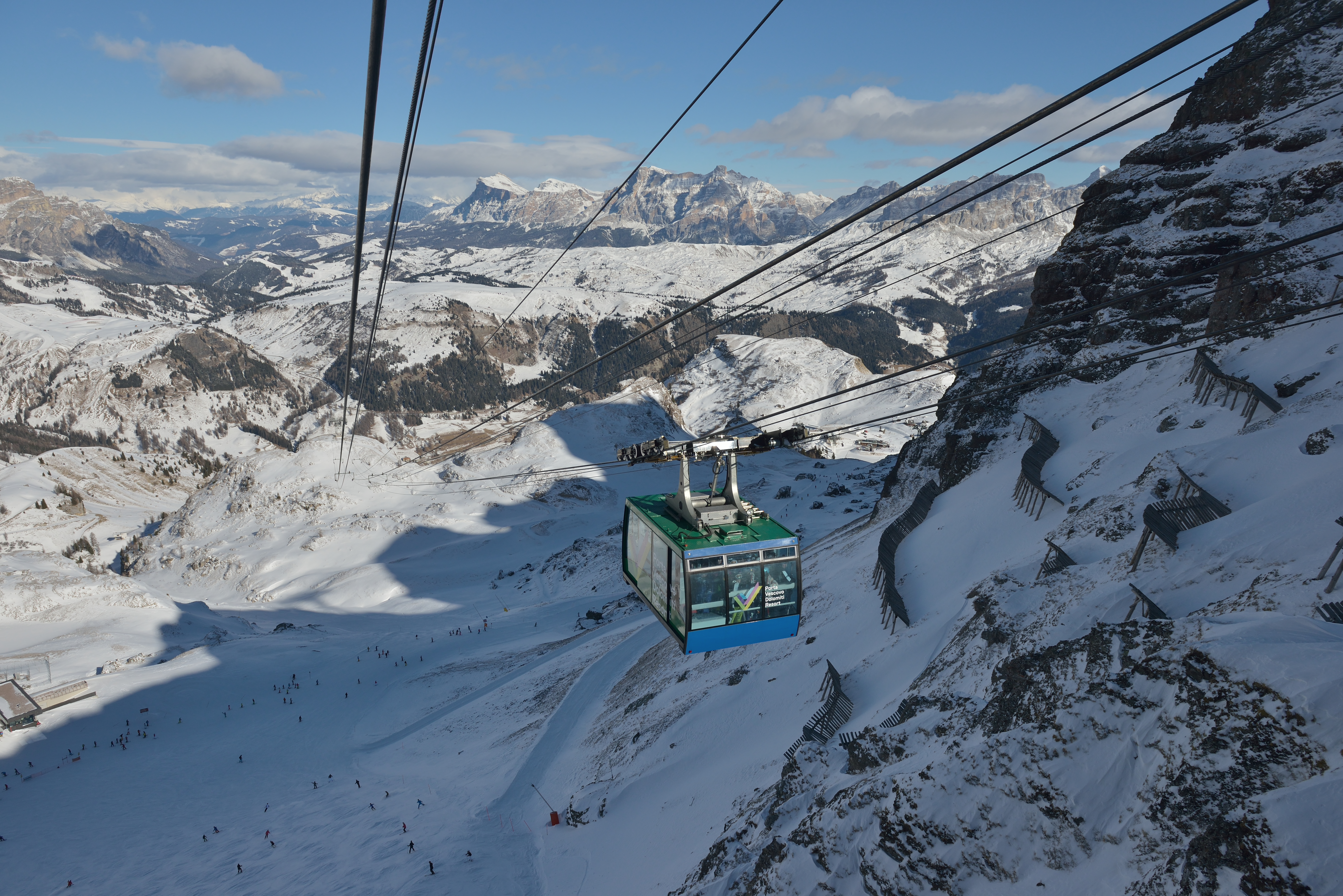
The Arabba Porta Vescovo Funifor

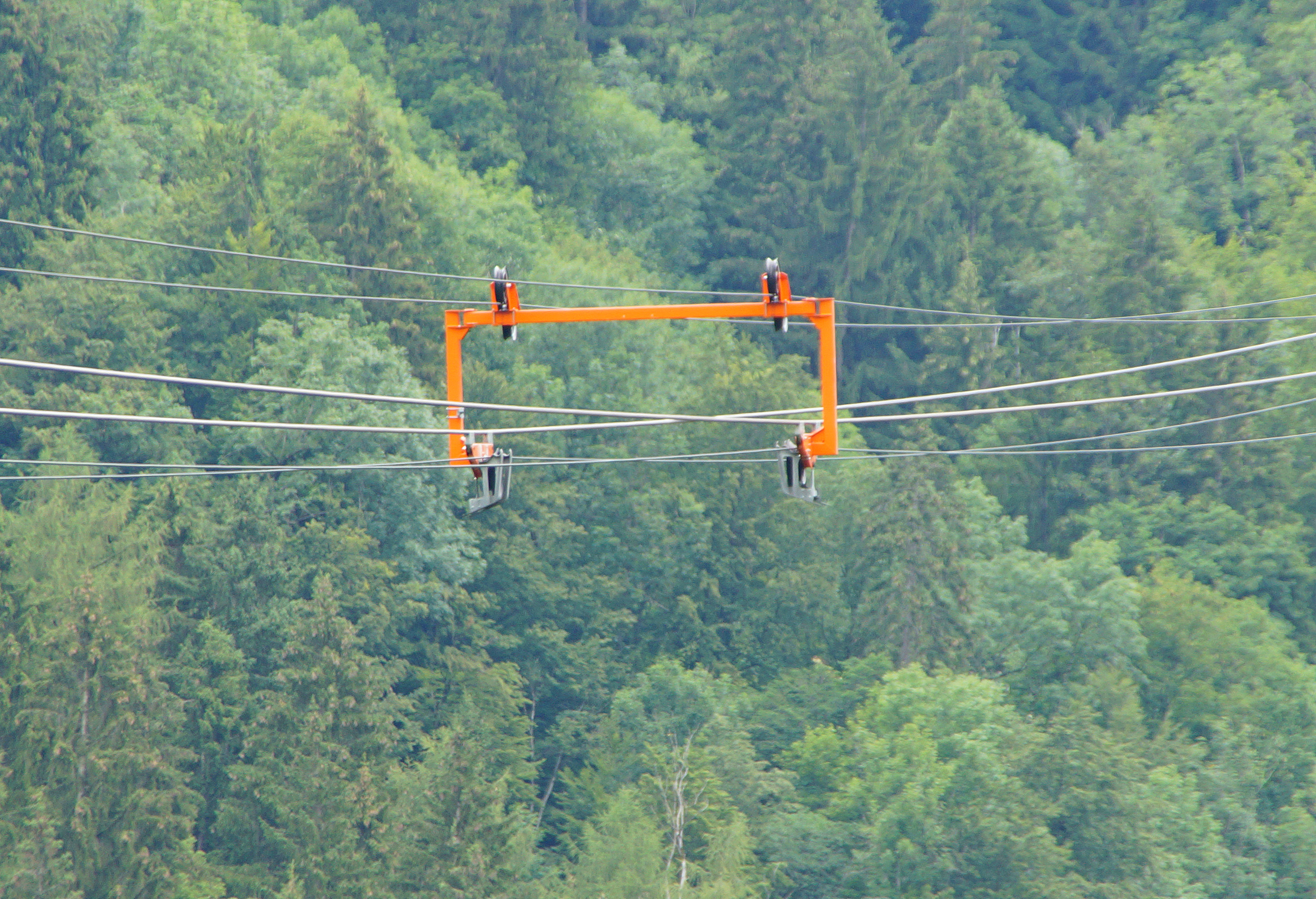
The returning haul cable (top), the support cables (middle), and the non-returning haul cable (bottom) are visible here. These structures appear at regular intervals along the line, to hold the cables together and keep a consistent track width

A funifor is a type of cable car with two support ropes and a haul rope, looped around. Each system is composed of a single cabin shuttling back-and-forth. Many installations are built with two parallel, but independent, lines. The funifor design was developed by the Italian manufacturer, Hölzl, which later merged with Doppelmayr Italia. Today, the design is therefore patented by Doppelmayr Garaventa Group.

At the top of each track, the haul rope loops back to the bottom instead of looping over to serve the other track, as would occur with a normal aerial tramway. This is shown in the diagram below. This feature allows for a single cabin operation when traffic warrants. The independent drive also allows for evacuations to occur by means of a bridge connection between adjacent cabins. The main advantage of the funifor system is its stability in high wind conditions owing to the horizontal distance between the two support ropes.

Diagram of the looped haul cable of the funifor system. The support cables are not shown

=== Chairlift ===
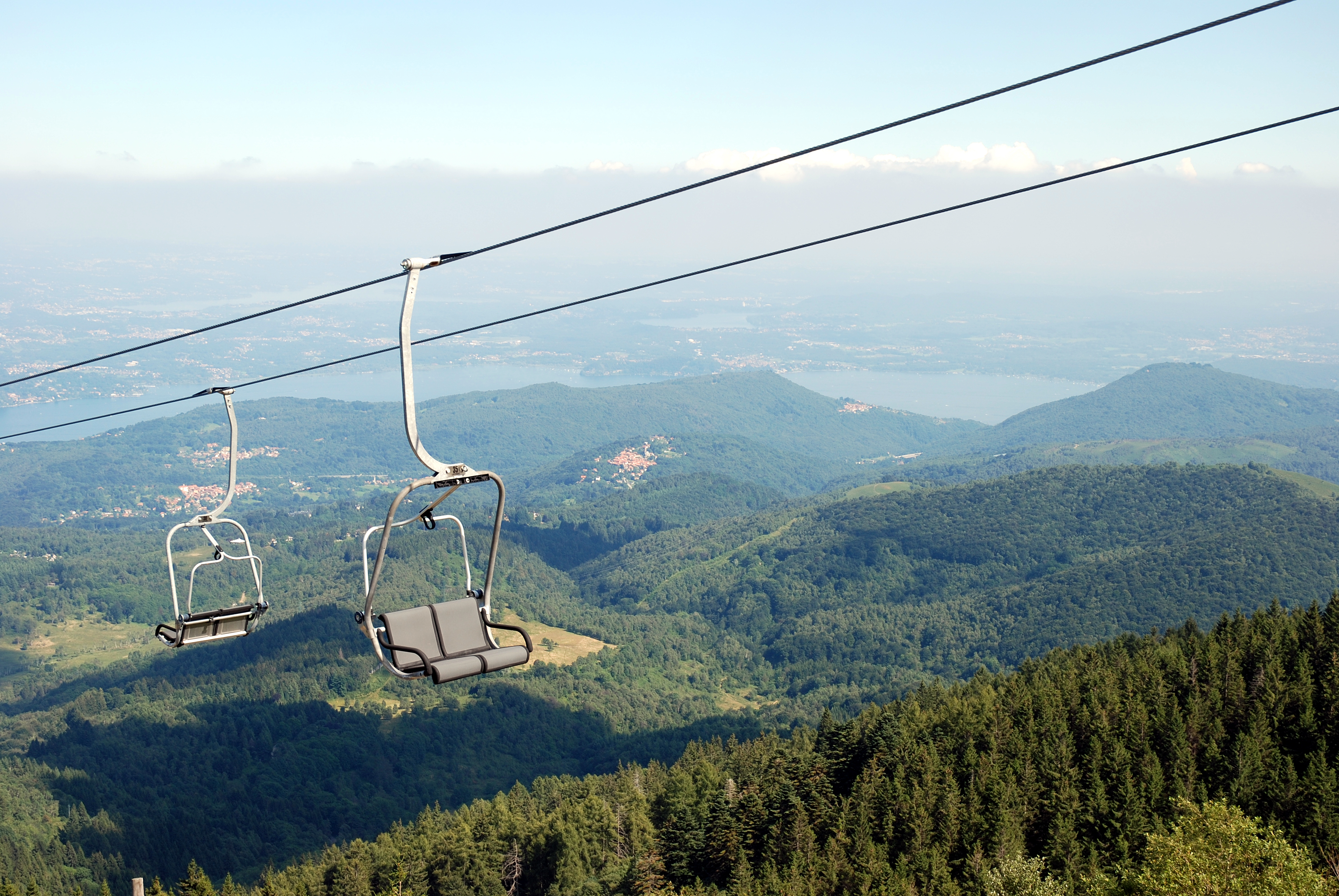
Fixed grip chairlift at Stresa, Italy.

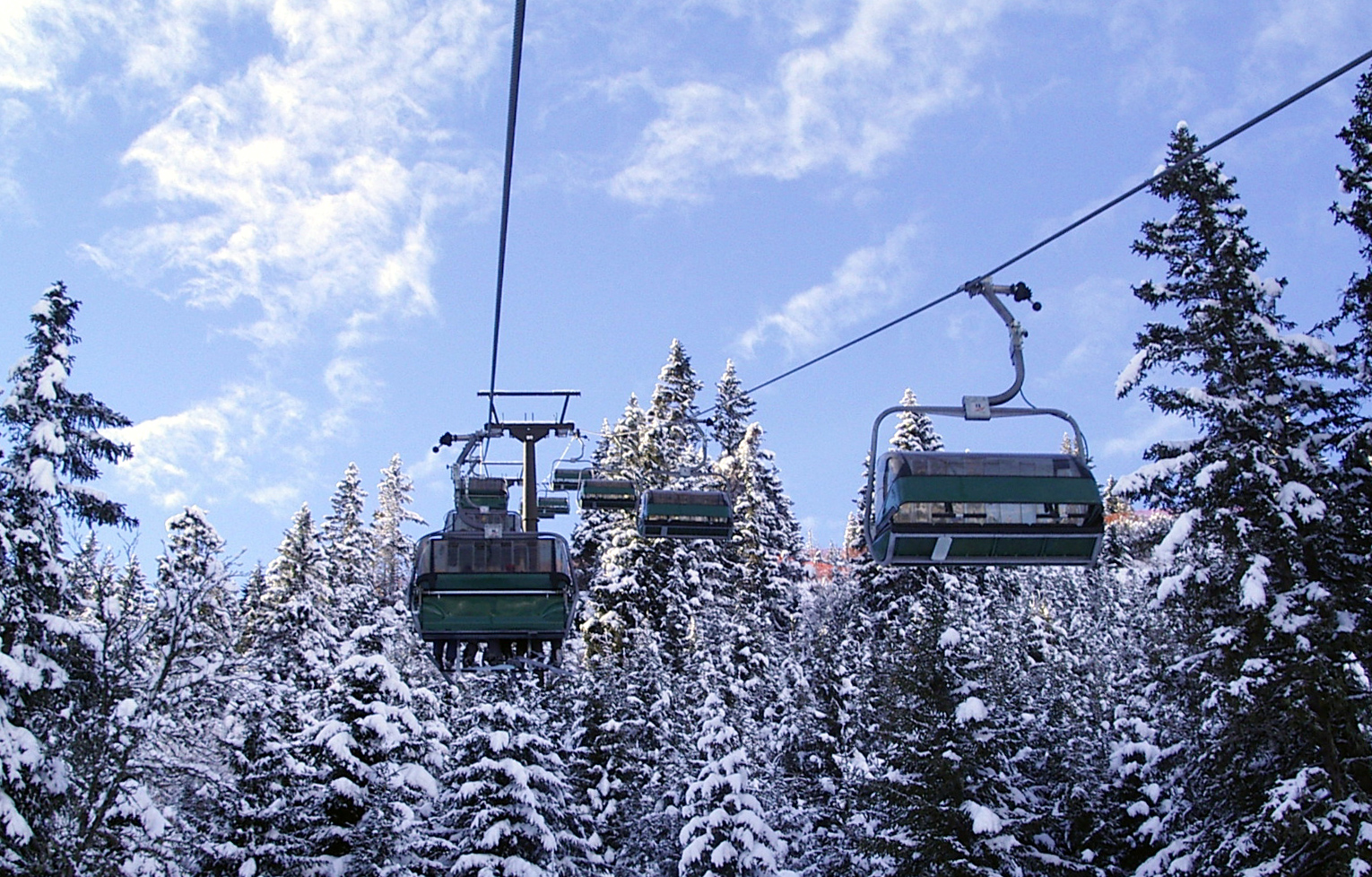
A detachable chairlift with a bubble, in Bad Hofgastein, Austria.

Chairlifts are continuously circulating systems carrying chairs, which usually enable skiers to board without removing skis. They are a common type of lift at most ski areas and in mountainous areas. They can also be found at some amusement parks and tourist attractions.

Under the Americal National Standards Institute guidelines for chairlifts with fixed grips, single chairs can travel up to 3 m/s (9.8 ft/s), double chairs 2.8 m/s (9.2 ft/s), and triple chairs 2.5 m/s (8.2 ft/s). Detachable chairlifts are designed to operate at approximately double the speed of fixed grip chairlifts: because the cable moves faster than most passengers could safely disembark and load, each chair is connected to the cable by a powerful spring-loaded cable grip which detaches at terminals, allowing the chair to slow considerably for convenient loading and unloading. Chairs may be fitted with a "bubble" canopy to offer weather protection.

=== Hybrid lift ===
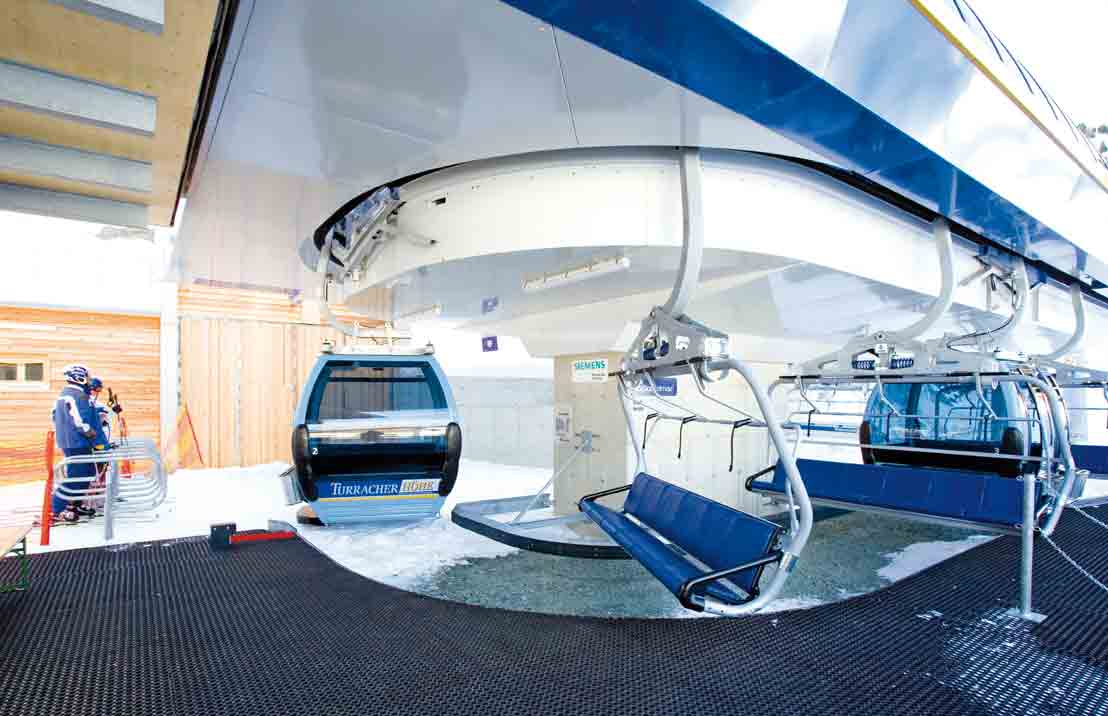
A hybrid lift in Turracher Höhe, Austria.

A hybrid lift is a fusion of a gondola lift and a chair lift. The company Leitner refers to it as telemix, while Doppelmayr uses the term combination lift. An example is Ski Arlberg's Weibermahd lift in Vorarlberg (Austria) which alternates between 8-person chairlifts and 10-person gondolas.

=== Hand-powered ===
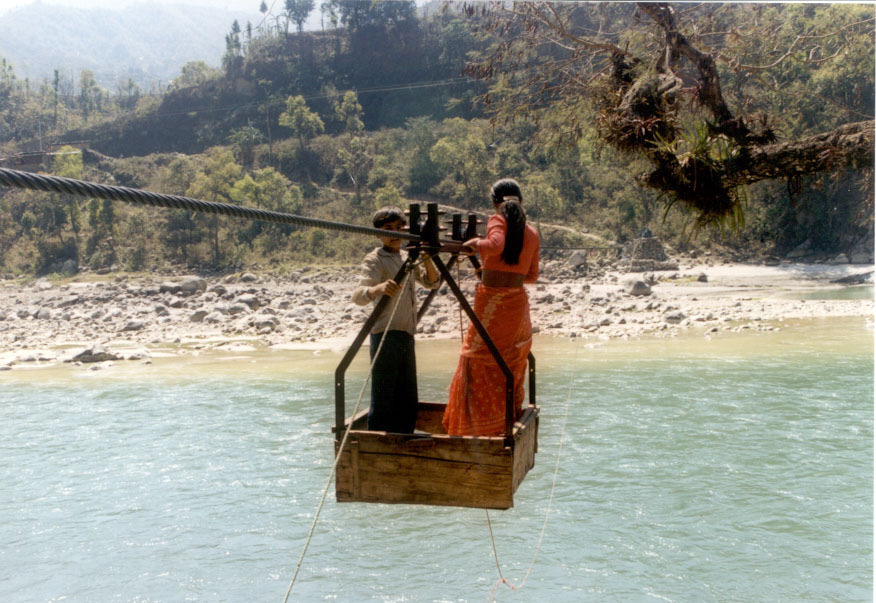
A tuin in use in Nepal

In undeveloped areas with rough terrain, simple hand-powered cable-cars may be used for crossing rivers, such as the tuin used in Nepal.

== Material ropeways ==
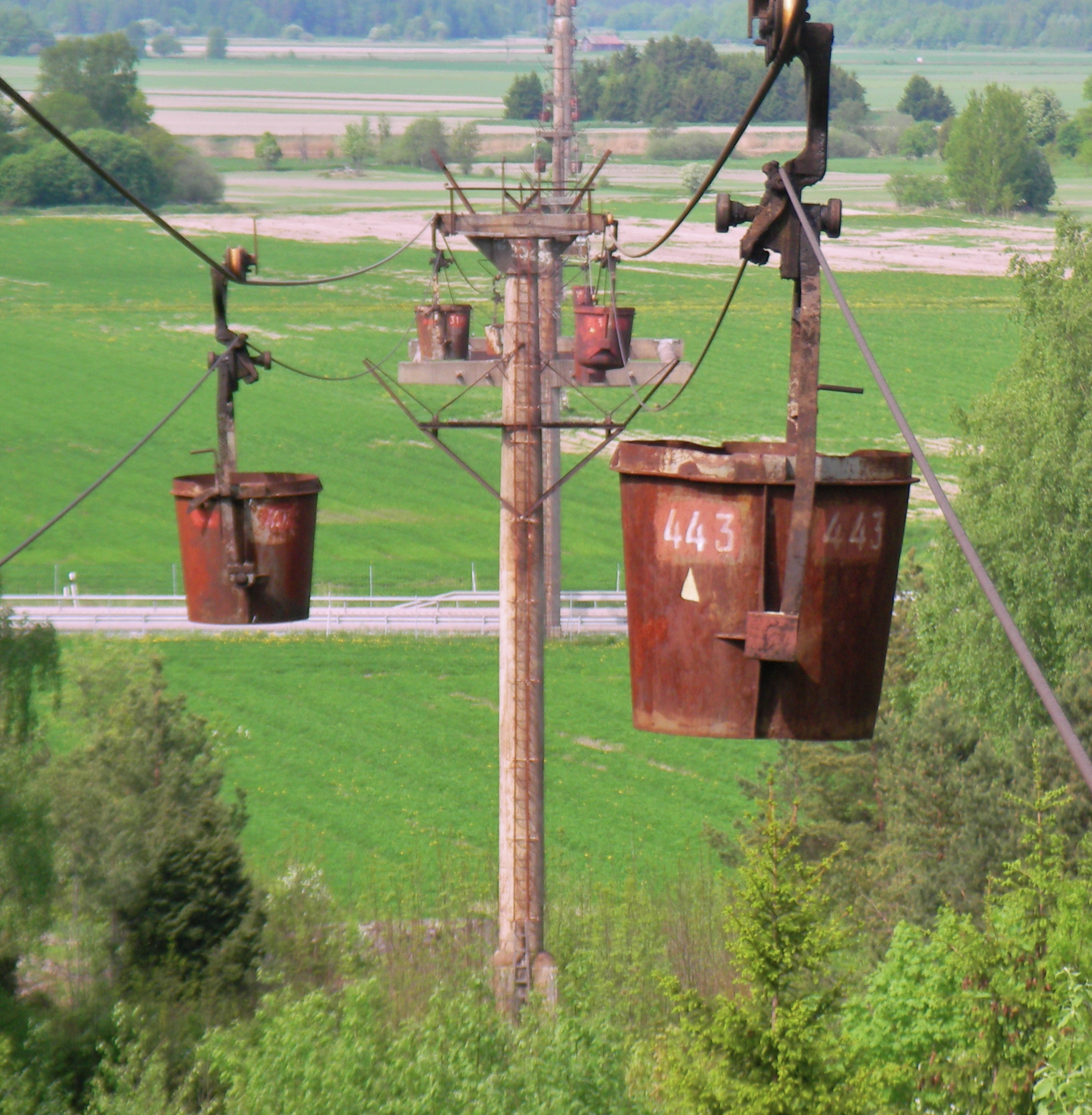
View along the Forsby-Köping limestone cableway, Sweden

A material ropeway or ropeway conveyor is an aerial lift from which containers for goods rather than passenger cars are suspended. These are usually monocable or bicable gondola lifts.

Material ropeways are typically found around large mining concerns, and can be of considerable length. The COMILOG Cableway, which ran from Moanda in Gabon to Mbinda in the Republic of the Congo, was around 76 km in length. The Norsjö aerial tramway in Sweden, which was built in 1943 to transport ore from Kristenberg to Boliden, had a length of 96 kilometers, holding the Guinness World Record for the longest material-transport cable car.

== Abbreviations ==
The following abbreviations are frequently used in the industry:

en	English	fr	French	de	German
ATW	Aerial Tramway	TPH	Téléphérique	PB	Pendelbahn
MGD	Monocable gondola detachable	TCD	Télécabine débrayable	EUB	Einseilumlaufbahn
BGD	Bicable gondola detachable	TPH 2S	Téléphérique 2S	ZUB	Zweiseilumlaufbahn
TGD	Tricable gondola detachable	TPH 3S	Téléphérique 3S	3S	3S-Bahn
MGFP	Monocable gondola fixed grip pulsed	TCP	Télécabine pulsée	GUB	Einseil-Gruppenumlaufbahn
MGFJ	Monocable gondola fixed grip jigback	TCV	Télécabine à va-et-vient	GPB	Einseil-Gruppenpendelbahn
BGFP	Bicable gondola fixed grip pulsed	TPH P	Téléphérique pulsé		Zweiseil-Gruppenumlaufbahn
CLF	Chairlift fixed grip	TSF	Télésiège à pince fixe	SB	Sesselbahn fix geklemmt
CLD	Chairlift detachable	TSD	Télésiège débrayable	KSB	kuppelbare Sesselbahn
CGD	Chairlift gondola detachable	TSCD or TMX	Téléporté débrayable avec sièges et cabines or Télémix		Kombibahn (Sessel + Gondel)
FT	Funitel	FUN	Funitel		Funitel
FUF	Funifor	FUF	Funifor		Funifor
RPC	Rope conveyor		Télécorde		Materialseilbahn

== See also ==
- Blondin (quarry equipment)
- Cable car (railway)
- Funicular
- List of aerial lift manufacturers
- Space elevator
- Surface lift, another transportation technology,
- Téléscaphe, a unique underwater cableway for tourist visits to the seabed
