= Rusksele =

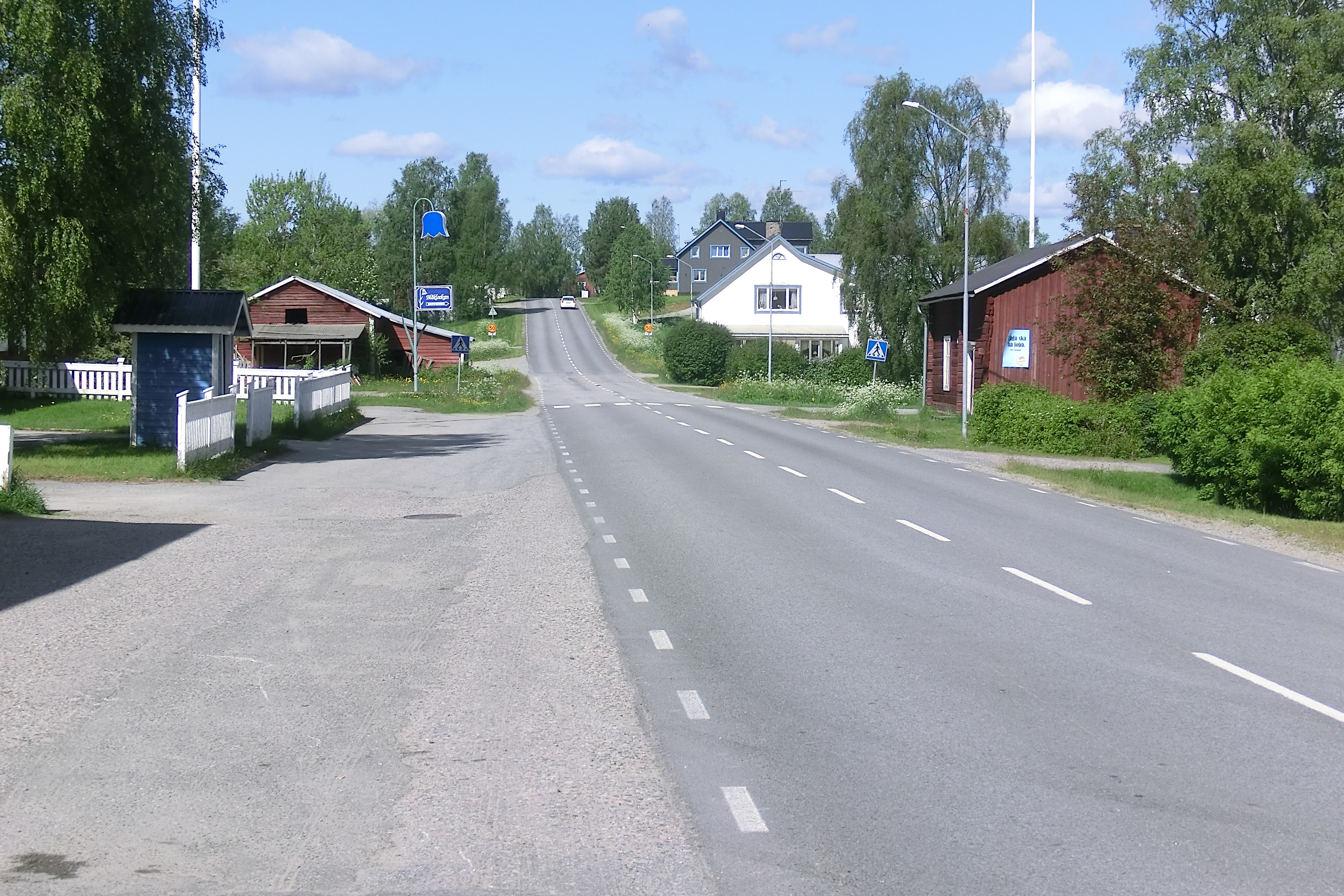
- Rusksele

- Location within Västerbotten Location within Sweden
- Coordinates: 64°48′50″N 18°53′30″E
- Country: Sweden
- Province: Lapland
- County: Västerbotten County
- Municipality: Lycksele Municipality

Area
  - Total: 0.63 km^{2} (0.24 sq mi)

Population (31 December 2010)
  - Total: 200
  - Density: 316/km^{2} (820/sq mi)
- Time zone: UTC+1 (CET)
  - Summer (DST): UTC+2 (CEST)

Rusksele is a locality situated in Lycksele Municipality, Västerbotten County, Sweden with 200 inhabitants in 2010.
