= Kristineberg, Lycksele =

Kristineberg
- Location within Västerbotten Location within Sweden
- Coordinates: 65°04′N 18°35′E
- Country: Sweden
- Province: Lapland
- County: Västerbotten County
- Municipality: Lycksele Municipality

Area
  - Total: 1.04 km^{2} (0.40 sq mi)

Population (31 December 2010)
  - Total: 257
  - Density: 246/km^{2} (640/sq mi)
- Time zone: UTC+1 (CET)
  - Summer (DST): UTC+2 (CEST)

Kristineberg is a locality situated in Lycksele Municipality, Västerbotten County, Sweden with 257 inhabitants in 2010.

Near Kristineberg is Kristinebergsgruvan, a former open pit copper mine exploited by the predecessor of the present Boliden AB. The ore was transported via a 96 km long ropeway conveyor to Boliden and from there via railway to the port of Skellefteå. The ropeway has been closed in 1987 except for 13 km used by the Norsjö aerial tramway as a tourist attraction.

== History ==
In 1887, Karl and Kristina Hultdins founded a farm in the area and named it Kristineberg. Karl Hultdins and his son found mineral deposits there and attempted to mine it, but in 1937 were forced to sell their land to the mining company Boliden. The present-day town of Kristineberg quickly formed around the mine.
