= Ropeway =

Ropeway may refer to:

== Cable transport ==
- Cableway, or cable transport, a broad class of transport modes that have cables
- Aerial lift, a means of cable transport in which cabins, cars, gondolas, or open chairs are hauled above the ground by means of one or more cables
  - Aerial tramway, a type of aerial lift in which cabins shuttle back and forth on cables
  - Gondola lift, a type of aerial lift with continuously circulating cable and multiple gondola cabins
- Ropeway conveyor, a subtype of aerial lift, from which containers for goods rather than passenger cars are suspended

== Other use ==
- Ropeway (sailing), a form of naval lifting device used to transport light stores and equipment across rivers or ravines; see Gyn
