= Norsjö ropeway =

Aerial tramway in Sweden

Coordinates: 65°00′28″N 19°36′49″E

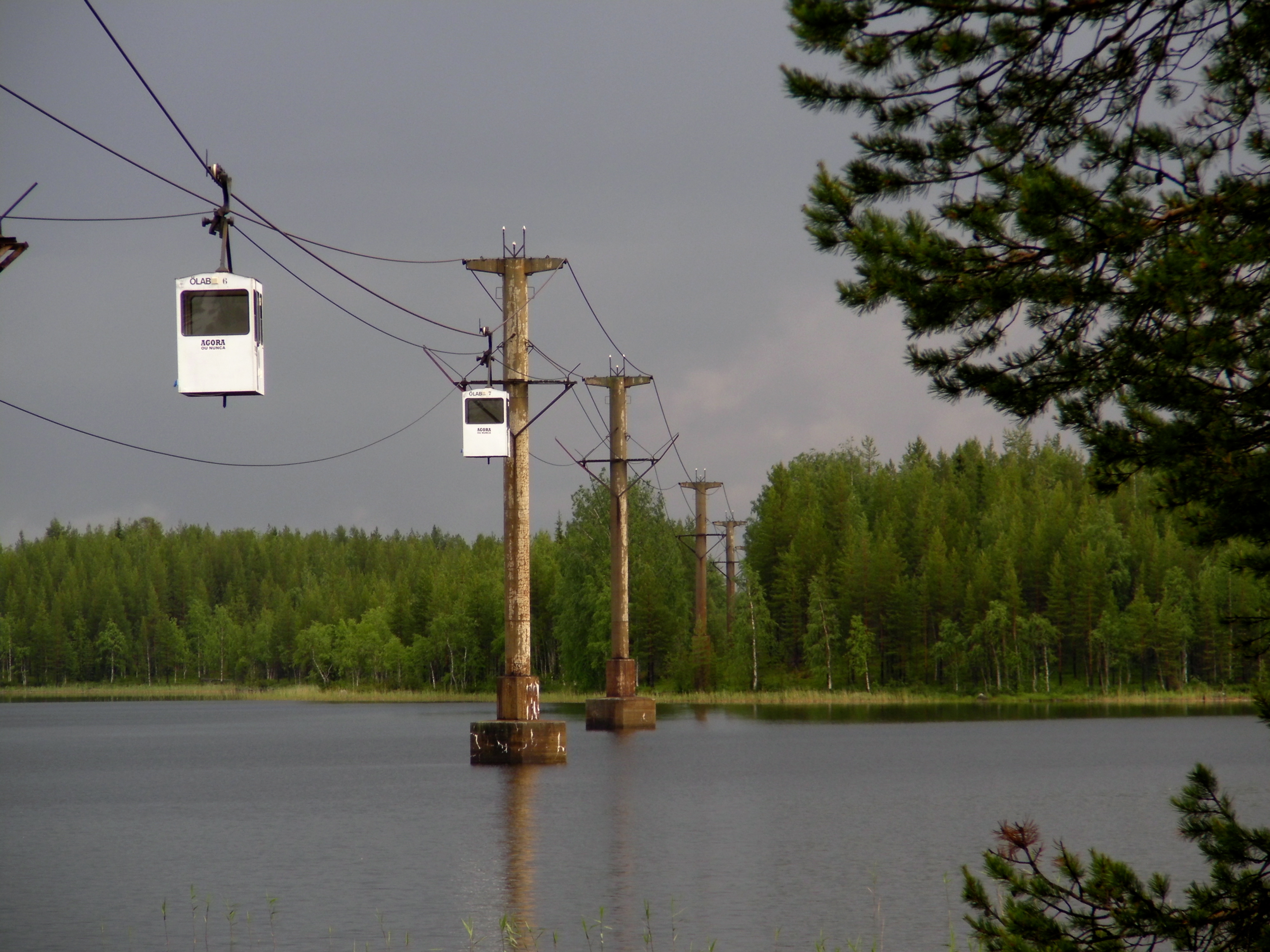
Passenger traffic on section IV (2011)

Norsjö aerial tramway is a 13.2 kilometre long aerial tramway (cable car) between Örträsk and Mensträsk in the Norsjö Municipality in Sweden.

Norsjö aerial tramway went in service for passenger traffic in 1989 as a tourist attraction. It is a section of the longest ropeway conveyor in the world at 96 km, built in the 1940s by the predecessors of Boliden AB to transport buckets of ore from Kristineberg, Lycksele to Boliden. Between 1943 and 1987 this ropeway moved 12 million tons of ore concentrates containing copper, lead, zinc, sulfur, silver and gold.

In technical terms, the Norsjö aerial tramway is a bi-cable gondola lift with detachable cabins suspended from a track rope and moved by a haul rope. The cabins can each carry four people at a speed of 10 km/hour, taking 1 hour and 45 minutes to ride one way. 3 km of the ride is above lakes and streams.

== Kristineberg-Boliden ropeway ==
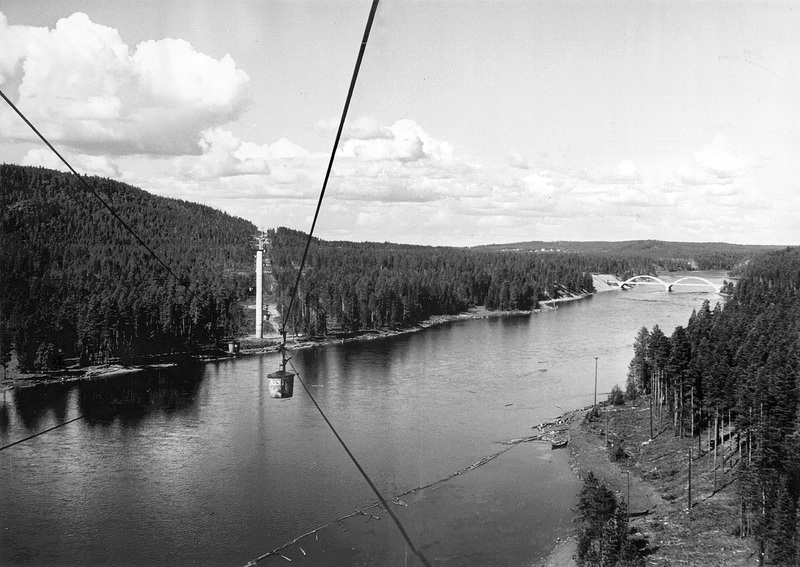
Ropeway crossing Skellefte river in 1953

The shortage of fuel and rubber during World War II made road transport of ore increasingly expensive for Boliden AB. With a straight-line distance of around 90 kilometers, the copper mine in Kristinberg was farthest from its main facility in Boliden. In addition to the rationed imports, steel and even concrete were precious commodities at the time. So while a couple of railway solutions, including a narrow gauge railway, were evaluated the ropeway came out on top because of its favourable construction material requirements.

Planning started in 1941, the initial idea was run the ropeway straight between Boliden and Kristineberg, with supports made from arsenic-treated wood to keep construction costs at a minimum. To make the most of the investment, however, it was decided to run the line across a number of newly discovered ore bodies to allow loading onto the ropeway once exploration was commenced - intermediate stations were required around every 13 km in any case. Reinforced concrete supports were chosen in lieu of wood, making them substantially longer-lasting with less maintenance. The supports and mechanical systems were identical to the 42 km Forsby-Köping limestone cableway completed in 1941 in middle Sweden, which served as a proof-of-concept for the enormous technological undertaking.

By April 1942, a workforce of 1500 men was deployed to pave support roads, clear forest (in a 40 m wide corridor to avoid damage from falling trees), cast and assemble supports and mechanical stations. 514 poles - with 16 standing in waterways - were raised, along with 10 driving- and loading stations as well as 25 intermediate tension stations. The tallest pillars at the crossing of the Skellefte river were 38 m tall with an internal staircase. Pole-to-pole span ranged between 11 and 429 meters.

The first ore gondola was sent across the 96 km line on 14 April 1943, 370 days after construction commenced and 4 ½ months ahead of schedule. During its 45 years of operation, the cableway was periodically evaluated for its competitiveness with road transport. Numerous optimizations, including lighter gondolas and full-on automation were enacted to maintain its lead. Eventually in 1986 the circumstances had changed to the point where heavy trucks were more economical, and the ropeway was closed and demolished in the following years.

At the time of decommissioning a society was founded, Världens längsta linbaneförening ("World's longest ropeway society"), for the preservation of the cableway. Section IV, one of the eight parts of roughly 13 km, was preserved and converted to passenger transport. As of 2013 it is still operated during the summer and a few other occasions by Linab i Norsjö AB.

While all mechanical installations for the rest of the system, as well as gondolas and cables were torn down, most of the support pillars were left standing along their path through the woods. The cut-down corridor is still clearly visible on satellite images, a number of support pillars can also be seen at road crossings in Google street view.

== See also ==
- Ropeway conveyor
- Aerial lift
- Kalklinbanan
- COMILOG Cableway
