= Material ropeway =

Type of gondola lift for goods transport

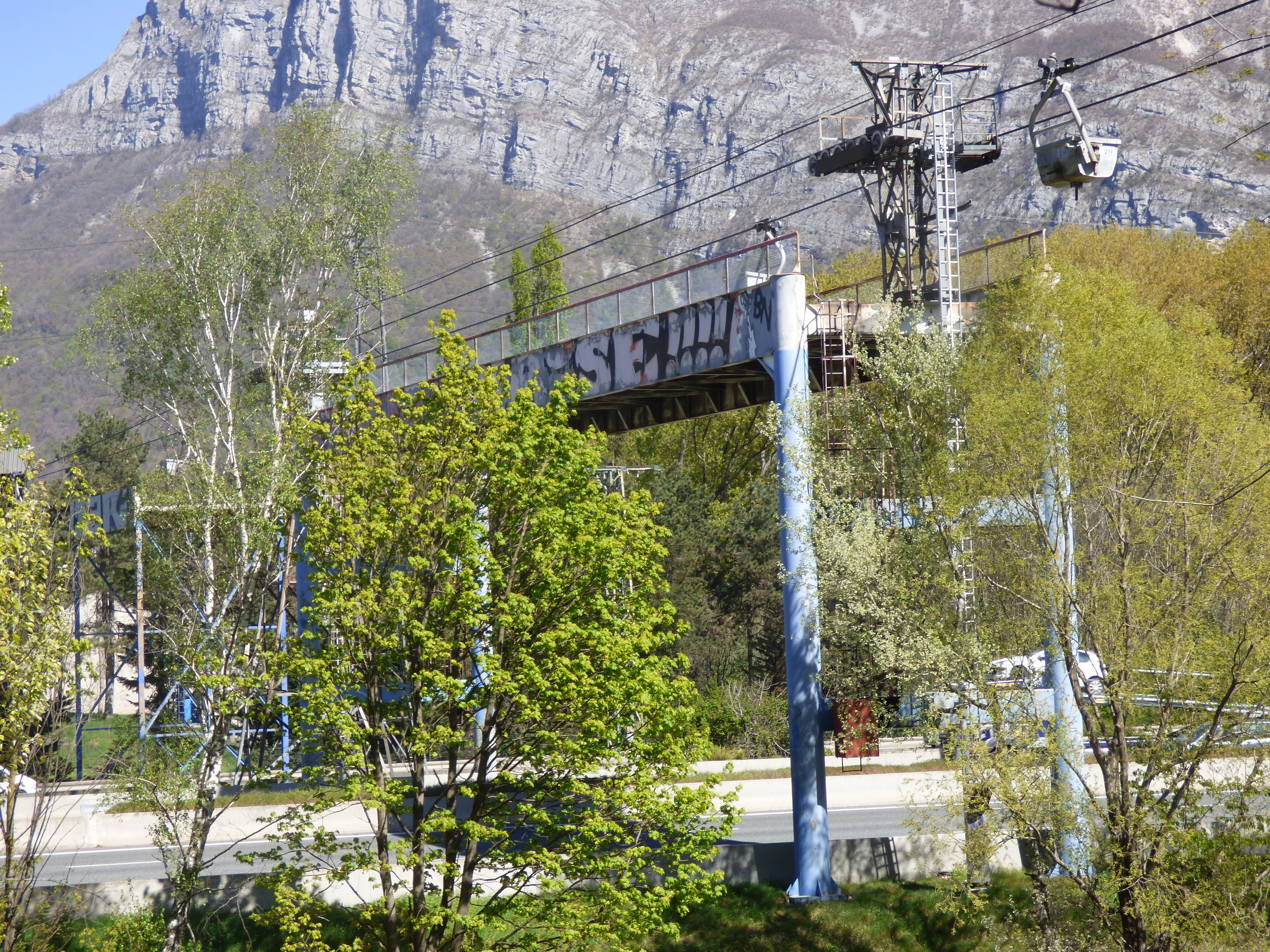
Active cableway between the Vicat quarry in Sassenage and their plant in Saint-Égrève crossing over the A48 motorway west of Grenoble, France

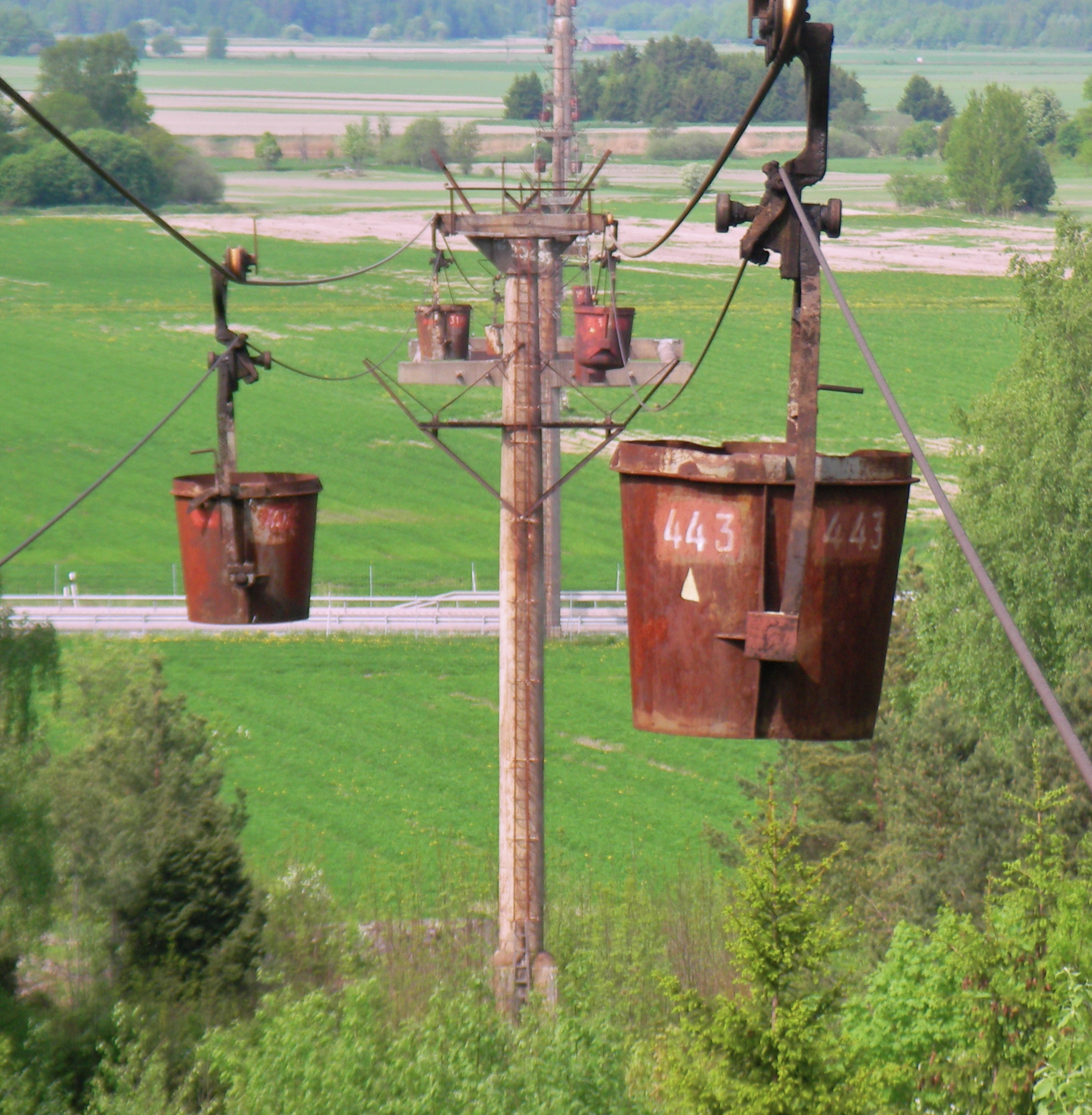
View along the Forsby-Köping limestone cableway, Sweden

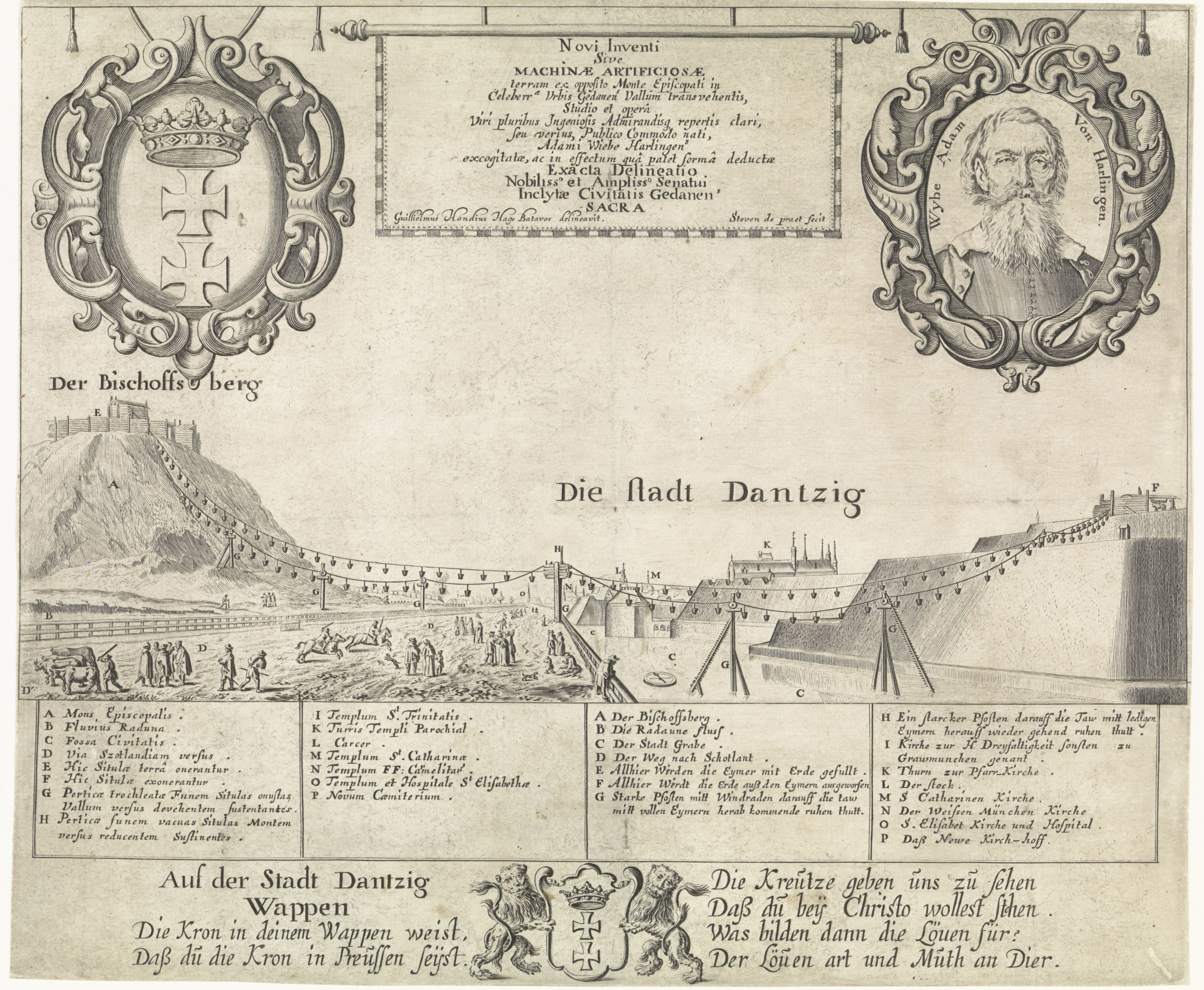
Etching of the world's first cable car, created by Adam Wybe in Gdańsk (etching by Willem Hondius)

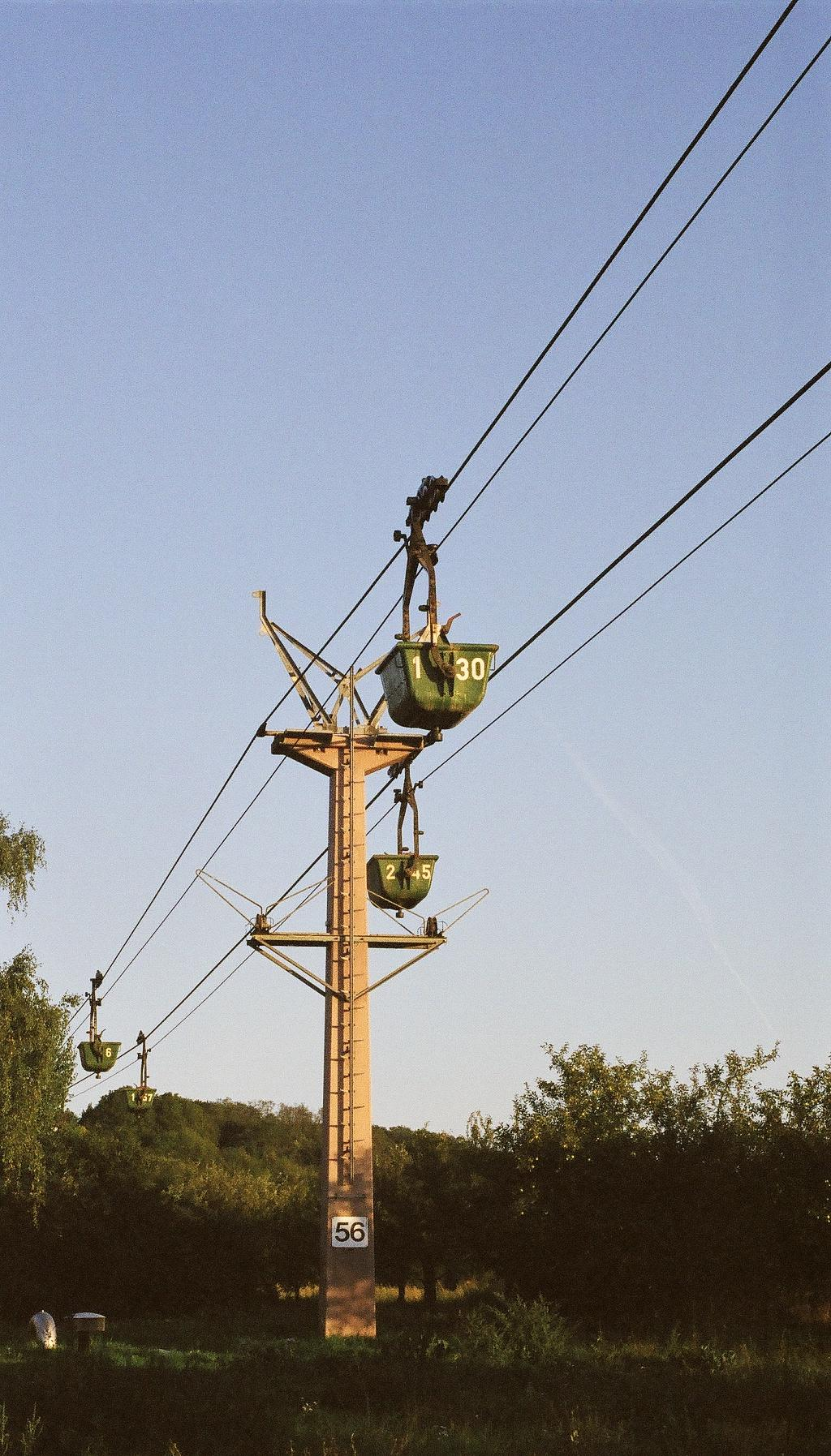
Material ropeway in Nußloch, Germany

A material ropeway, ropeway conveyor (or aerial tramway in the US) is a subtype of gondola lift or aerial tramway, from which containers for goods rather than passenger cars are suspended.

== Description ==
Material ropeways are typically found around large mining concerns, and can be of considerable length. The COMILOG Cableway, which ran from Moanda in Gabon to Mbinda in the Republic of the Congo, was over 75 km (47 mi) in length. The Kristineberg-Boliden ropeway in Sweden had a length of 96 km (60 mi).

Conveyors can be powered by a wide variety of forms of energy, such as electricity, engines, or gravity (particularly in mountainous mining concerns, or where running water is available). Gravity-driven conveyors may qualify as zip-lines, as no electricity is used to operate them, instead relying on the weight of carts going down providing propulsion for empty carts going up.

Double-rope (bi-cable) ropeways, have a stationary carrying rope and a separate hauling rope that controls their movement. Single-rope (mono-cable) ropeways use one carrying-hauling rope.

== History ==
The first recorded mechanical ropeway was by Croatian Fausto Veranzio who designed a bicable passenger ropeway in 1616. The world's first cable car on multiple supports was built by Adam Wybe in Gdańsk, Poland in 1644. It was powered by horses and used to move soil over the river to build defences.

In Eritrea, the Italians built the Asmara-Massawa Cableway in 1936, which was 75 km (47 mi) long. The Manizales - Mariquita Cableway (1922) in Colombia was 73 km (45 mi) long.

Amongst the first material ropeways in India was the Amarkantak Ropeway in Chaktipani, Korba, Chhattisgarh, which was 16.8 km (10.4 mi) long with capacity of 150 TPH constructed by Damodar Ropeways & Infra Ltd. (DRIL) (formerly known as (Damodar Enterprises Ltd. (DEL). It was made for Bharat Aluminium Company (Balco) in collaboration with Nikex, Hungary.

In the United Kingdom, aerial ropeways used for conveying mining goods and materials were historically common; however, just one remains in existence and operation, in Claughton, Lancashire, constructed in 1924 and used for quarrying shale to make bricks. It is scheduled to be demolished in 2036, once the last of the shale has been quarried.

== List ==
=== Closed ropeways ===
Ropeway line / Company	System	Type	Support type	Length	Fall/Rise	City/State	Country	In operation	Notes
American Agricultural Chemical Company	Trenton-Bleichert	Double-rope	Wood			Searsport, Maine	USA		
Maine Insane Hospital	Trenton-Bleichert	Double-rope	Wood	1,050 feet	150 feet	Augusta, Maine	USA	1899 -	
Plymouth Cordage Company	Trenton-Bleichert	Double-rope	Steel	1,150 feet		Plymouth, Massachusetts	USA		
Farnam-Cheshire Lime Company	Trenton-Bleichert	Double-rope	Wood			Cheshire, Massachusetts	USA		
Cayuga Lake Cement Company	Trenton-Bleichert	Double-rope		2,340 feet		Ithaca, New York	USA	1901 -	
Magnetic Iron Ore Company	Trenton-Bleichert			290 feet	25 rise	Benson Mines, New York	USA		
Solvay Process Company	Trenton-Bleichert	Double-rope	Wood	16,500 feet	239 feet	Syracuse, New York	USA		
Warner's Portland Cement Company	Trenton-Bleichert	Double-rope		1,056 feet	48 feet	Syracuse, New York	USA		
Catskill Cement Company	Trenton-Bleichert	Double-rope		4,170 feet		Smith's Landing, New York	USA		
Witherbees, Sherman & Company	Trenton-Bleichert	Double-rope		3,668 feet	406 feet	Port Henry, New York	USA		
United States Military Academy	Trenton-Bleichert	Double-rope	Iron	1,640 feet		West Point, New York	USA	1901 -	
Edgewater Lime Works	Trenton-Bleichert	Double-rope		360 feet	20 feet	Edgewater, New Jersey	USA	1901 -	
Vermont Marble Company	Trenton-Bleichert	Double-rope		1,600 feet		Proctor, Vermont	USA	1894 -	
New England Talc Company	Trenton-Bleichert	Double-rope	Wood	2,400 feet		Stockbridge, Vermont	USA		
Hickory Hill Mine		Double-rope	Steel	13,200 feet		Saxton, Pennsylvania	USA	1929-1944	coal mine to power plant
Pottsville Iron and Steel Company	Trenton-Bleichert	Double-rope		1,100 feet	70 feet	Pottsville, Pennsylvania	USA		
Cambria Steel Company	Trenton-Bleichert	Double-rope	Steel	3,260 feet		Johnstown, Pennsylvania	USA		
Curwensville Fire Brick Company	Trenton-Bleichert	Double-rope		2,337 feet		Bolivar, Pennsylvania	USA	1903 -	
Philadelphia & Reading Coal and Iron Company	Trenton-Bleichert	Single cable reversible				West Shenandoah Colliery, Pennsylvania	USA		
Keystone Plaster Company	Trenton-Bleichert	Double-rope		1,500 feet		Chester, Pennsylvania	USA		
Keystone Plaster Company	Trenton-Bleichert	Double-rope		1,400 feet	200 feet	East Brady, Pennsylvania	USA		
St. Bernard Coal Company	Trenton-Bleichert	Single cable reversible	Wood	600 feet		Earlington, Kentucky	USA		
East Shore Terminal Company	Trenton-Bleichert	Double-rope	Wood	700 feet	level	Charleston, South Carolina	USA		
East Shore Terminal Company	Trenton-Bleichert	Double-rope	Wood	650 feet	level	Charleston, South Carolina	USA		
Pulaski Iron Company	Trenton-Bleichert	Double-rope	960 feet	494 feet		Buchanan, Virginia	USA		
Royal Coal and Coke Company	Trenton-Bleichert	Double-rope		2,800 feet	820 feet	Prince, West Virginia	USA		
Bagdad Chase Gold Mining Company	Trenton-Bleichert	Double-rope	Wood			Atlanta, Idaho	USA	1903 - 1931	
Bunker Hill and Sullivan Mining and Concentrating Company	Trenton-Bleichert	Double-rope		9,000 feet	713 feet	Wardner, Idaho	USA	1891 -	
Bunker Hill and Sullivan Mining and Concentrating Company	Trenton-Bleichert	Double-rope		1,200 feet	370 feet	Wardner, Idaho	USA		
Pillsbury-Washburn Flour Mills Company	Trenton-Bleichert	Double-rope		320 feet	level	Minneapolis, Minnesota	USA		
St. Louis, Rocky Mountain & Pacific Company	Trenton-Bleichert	Double-rope	Wood			Koehler, New Mexico	USA		
United States Mining Company	Trenton-Bleichert	Double-rope	Wood			Bingham, Utah	USA		
Highland Boy Gold Mining Company	Trenton-Bleichert	Double-rope	Wood	12,700 feet		Bingham, Utah	USA		
Highland Boy Gold Mining Company	Trenton-Bleichert	Double-rope		20,975 feet		Bingham Canyon, Utah	USA	1910 -	
Utah Consolidated Mining Company	Trenton-Bleichert	Double-rope	Wood			Bingham Canyon, Utah	USA		
Yampa Smelting Company	Trenton-Bleichert	Double-rope	Wood			Bingham, Utah	USA		
Vallejo Tunnel and Mine Company	Hallidie	Single-rope	Wood	2,400 feet	600 feet	Little Cottonwood, Utah	USA	1872 - 1874	
North American Copper Company	Leschen	Double-rope	Wood	16 miles		Grand Encampment, Wyoming	USA	1904 -	
Nevada Gypsum Company	Trenton-Bleichert	Double-rope	Wood			Mound House, Nevada	USA		
Gold Prince Mine Tramway	Trenton-Bleichert	Double-rope	Wood			Animas Forks, Colorado	USA	1906 -	
Compromise Mining Company	Trenton-Bleichert	Double-rope		3,200 feet	920 feet	Aspen, Colorado	USA		
Aspen Public Tramway Company	Trenton-Bleichert	Double-rope	Wood	9,850 feet	2,409 feet	Aspen, Colorado	USA	1890 - 1893	
Carbon Coal and Coke Company	Trenton-Bleichert	Double-rope	Steel			Trinidad, Colorado	USA		
Old Hundred Mining Company	Trenton-Bleichert	Double-rope	Wood	1,850 feet	1,050 feet	Howardsville, Colorado	USA		
Victor Fuel Company	Trenton-Bleichert	Double-rope		1,850 feet	57 feet	Hastings, Colorado	USA		
St. Bernard Coal Company	Trenton-Bleichert	Single cable reversible		2,370 feet		Denver, Colorado	USA		
Old Hundred Mining Company	Trenton-Bleichert	Double-rope	Wood	760 feet	515 feet	Howardsville, Colorado	USA		
Old Hundred Mining Company	Trenton-Bleichert	Double-rope	Wood	1,610 feet		Howardsville, Colorado	USA		
Silver Age Mining and Milling Company	Trenton-Bleichert	Double-rope		6,240 feet	989 feet	Idaho Springs, Colorado	USA		
Sunnyside Extension Mine	Huson	Single-rope		2,279 feet		Silverton, Colorado	USA	1891 -	
Ross Mining Company	Trenton-Bleichert	Double cable reversible	Wood	1,400 feet	524 feet	Silverton, Colorado	USA		
Iowa Gold Mining and Milling Company	Trenton-Bleichert	Double cable reversible	Wood	8,625 feet		Silverton, Colorado	USA		
Shendandoah-Dives Mining Company		Double-rope	Wood	10,000 feet		Silverton, Colorado	USA	1929 - 1960	
Pay Rock Mine	Huson	Single-rope	Wood			Silver Plume, Colorado	USA		
Smuggler Union Mine	Trenton-Bleichert	Double-rope		3,150 feet		Creede, Colorado	USA		
Bachelor Commodore Mining Company	Trenton-Bleichert	Double-rope		3,310 feet		Creede, Colorado	USA		
Bachelor Commodore Mining Company	Trenton-Bleichert	Single cable reversible	Wood	850 feet	400 feet	Creede, Colorado	USA		
Smuggler Union Mine	Trenton-Bleichert	Double-rope		400 feet		Telluride, Colorado	USA		
San Juan Mining Company	Leschen and Sons	Double-rope	Wood			Telluride, Colorado	USA		
Colorado Fuel & Iron Company	Trenton-Bleichert	Double-rope		2,370 feet		Denver, Colorado	USA		
Keane Wonder Mine	Double-rope	Wood				Death Valley, California	USA		
Four Metals Mining Company	Montgomery	Double-rope	Wood	5,5 miles		Keeler, California	USA	1909 - 1914	
Inyo Cerro Gordo Mining and Power Company	Leschen	Double-rope	Wood	5,6 miles		Keeler, California	USA	1914 - 1959	
Morning Star Mine Tram		Double-rope	Wood			Keeler, California	USA		
Mountain Ledge Gold Mining Company	Trenton-Bleichert	Double-rope		5,800 feet	1,600 feet	Sierra City, California	USA		
Saline Valley Salt Company	Trenton-Bleichert	Double-rope	Wood	13,5 miles	3,000 feet	Swansea, California	USA	1913 - 1936	
Eureka Slate Company	Trenton-Bleichert	Double-rope		13,300 feet		Slatington, California	USA		
United Concentration Company	Trenton-Bleichert	Double-rope		6,600 feet	1,820 feet	Monte Cristo, Washington	USA		
Oregon Gold Mining Company	Trenton-Bleichert	Double-rope		5,000 feet	2,000 feet	Cornucopia, Oregon	USA		
Old Dominion Copper Company	Trenton-Bleichert	Double-rope		1,250 feet		Globe, Arizona	USA	1892 -	
Keeler, Holcombe & Company	Trenton-Bleichert	Double-rope		7,500 feet	1,850 feet	Kelly Switch, New Mexico	USA		
Consolidated Kansas City Smelting and Refining Company	Trenton-Bleichert	Double-rope		2,500 feet		El Paso, Texas	USA		
Bi-Metallic Mining Company	Trenton-Bleichert	Double-rope		9,750 feet	1,225 feet	Granite, Montana	USA		
Granite Mountain Mining Company	Trenton-Bleichert	Double-rope		8,750 feet	1,207 feet	Granite, Montana	USA		
Chilkoot Trail tramways	Trenton-Bleichert	Double-rope	Wood	8,250 feet/7 miles	1,070 feet	Chillkoot Pass, Alaska	USA	1898 -	
Nowell Gold Mining Company	Trenton-Bleichert	Double-rope		11,600 feet	2,297 feet	Juneau, Alaska	USA		
Mond Nickel Company	Trenton-Bleichert	Double-rope		11,400 feet		Victoria Mines, Ontario	Canada		
Laurentide Pulp Company	Trenton-Bleichert	Double-rope		1,500 feet	15 feet	Montreal	Canada		
Compania Metalurgica de Torreon	Trenton-Bleichert	Single cable reversible	Wood	1,453 feet	730 feet	Coahuila, Mexico	Mexico		
La Gran Fundicion National Mexicana	Trenton-Bleichert	Double-rope	Wood	8,650 feet		Santa Catarina, Mexico	Mexico		
San Toy Mining Company	Trenton-Bleichert	Double-rope	Steel			Chihuahua	Mexico		
Thomas & Spillane	Trenton-Bleichert	Double-rope		825 feet	425 feet	San Luis Potosí	Mexico		
Cia. Manufacturera de Ladrillos Areniscos	Trenton-Bleichert	Double-rope		1,950 feet		Coah	Mexico		
Trinidad Asphalt Company	Trenton-Bleichert	Double-rope	Iron	5,100 feet	80 feet	La Brea, Trinidad	Trinidad		
Compagnie Heitienne	Trenton-Bleichert	Double-rope	Iron	12 miles		Port de Paix, Haiti	Haiti		
Vivero Iron Ore Company- Mina de la Silvarosa	Trenton-Bleichert	Double-rope	Iron	625 feet		Vivero, Spain	Spain	1899 -	
British Australian Oil Company	Bleichert	Double-rope	Steel	3.5 miles	500 feet	Murrurundi, New South Wales,	Australia	1911-1915	Carried oil shale
Hoskins Iron & Steel		Single-rope	Steel	0.75 miles		Cadia, New South Wales	Australia	1918-1928	Carried iron ore
Kandos Cement Company	No.1	Single-rope	Steel	3 miles		Kandos, New South Wales	Australia	1915-	Carried limestone
Kandos Cement Company	No.2	Single-rope	Steel	3.25 miles		Kandos, New South Wales	Australia	1920-	
Kandos Cement Company	No.3	Double-rope	Steel			Kandos, New South Wales	Australia	1989-2011	
Warragamba Dam	(Construction phase)	Single-rope	Steel	22 km		Near Penrith to Warragamba Dam construction site, New South Wales	Australia	c.1952-c.1960	Carried gravel and sand
Hellenic Mining Company		Double-rope	Wood and Steel	1,750 ft		Vasiliko, Larnaca District	Cyprus	1938-1978	Constructed by British Ropeway Engineering Co.; carried Copper ore, gypsum

== See also ==
- Ropeway
- Zip-line
