= Lycksele Municipality =

Lycksele Municipality Lycksele kommun
- Municipality
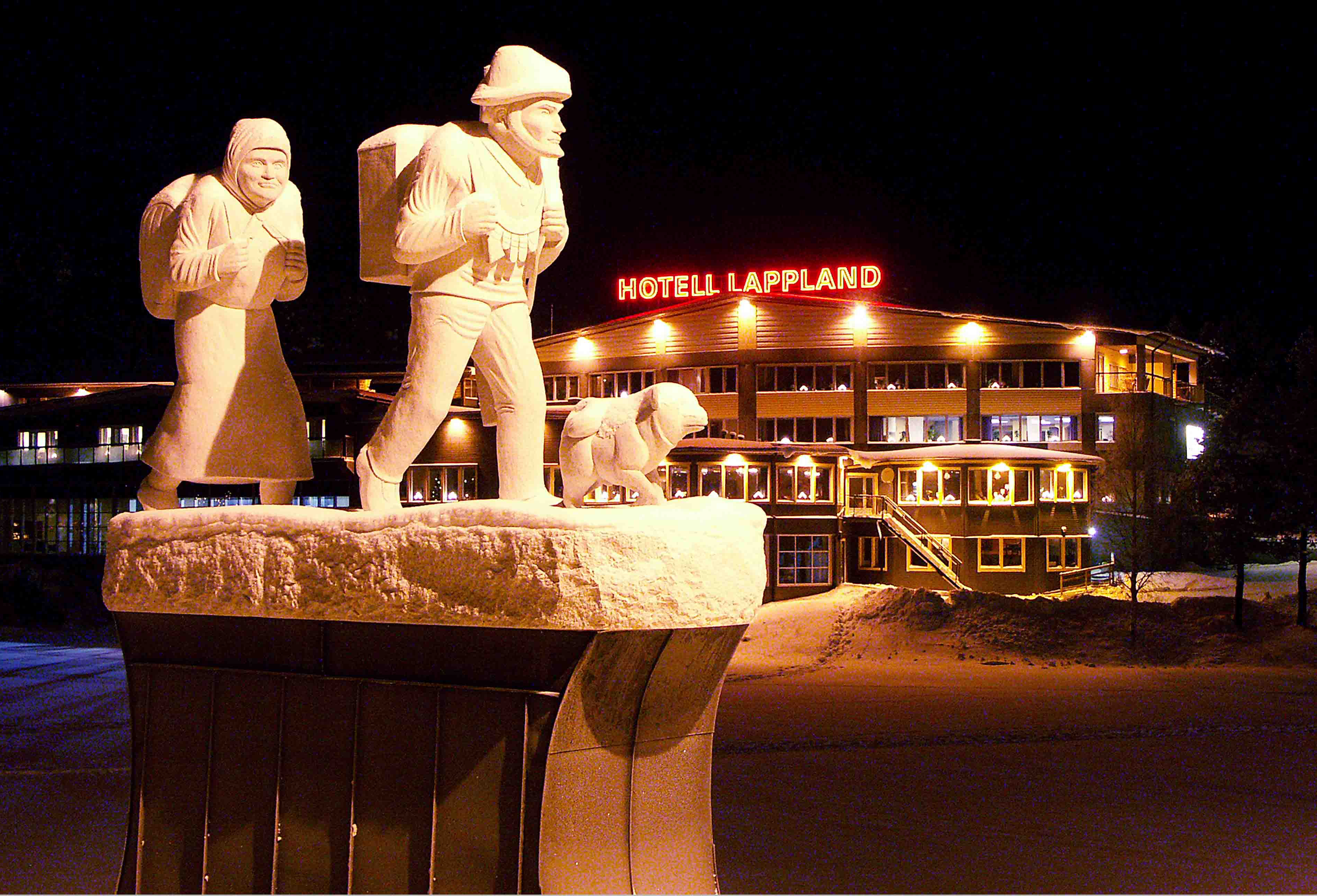
- Monument of the first settlers coming to the Lycksele area

- Coat of arms

- Coordinates: 64°36′N 18°40′E
- Country: Sweden
- County: Västerbotten County
- Seat: Lycksele

Area
  - Total: 5,888.93 km^{2} (2,273.73 sq mi)
  - Land: 5,518.49 km^{2} (2,130.70 sq mi)
  - Water: 370.44 km^{2} (143.03 sq mi)
- Area as of 1 January 2014.

Population (30 June 2025)
  - Total: 12,135
  - Density: 2.1990/km^{2} (5.6953/sq mi)
- Time zone: UTC+1 (CET)
  - Summer (DST): UTC+2 (CEST)
- ISO 3166 code: SE
- Province: Lapland
- Municipal code: 2481
- Website: www.lycksele.se

Lycksele Municipality (Swedish: Lycksele kommun; Southern Sami: Liksjoe tjïelte; Ume Sami: Liksjuon kommuvdna) is a municipality in Västerbotten County in northern Sweden. Its seat is located in Lycksele and the municipality is located in the southern parts of Swedish Lapland.

The municipality traces its history to Lycksele parish, which was in effect during the 19th century with very similar borders and size (5,000-5,500 km^{2}). The whole rural municipality Lycksele became a market town (köping) in 1929 and city in 1946. In 1971 it was amalgamated with Örträsk Municipality.

Generally the northern municipalities, already sparsely populated, have population decreases, but various supporting projects also exist. For instance, a campus of Umeå University is situated here.

== Localities ==
There are two localities (or urban areas) in Lycksele Municipality:

#	Locality	Population
1	**Lycksele**	8,597
2	Kristineberg	331

The municipal seat in bold

== Demographics ==
This is a demographic table based on Lycksele Municipality's electoral districts in the 2022 Swedish general election sourced from SVT's election platform, in turn taken from SCB official statistics.

In total there were 12,255 residents, including 9,233 Swedish citizens of voting age. 53.2% voted for the left coalition and 46.0% for the right coalition. Indicators are in percentage points except population totals and income.

Location	Residents	Citizen adults	Left vote	Right vote	Employed	Swedish parents	Foreign heritage	Income SEK	Degree
Location			%	%					
Björksele	795	571	52.0	47.3	82	85	15	23,272	29
Forsdala	1,757	1,300	48.1	51.6	89	91	9	27,840	37
Kattisavan	548	431	45.8	51.0	81	94	6	22,334	33
Knaften	874	696	47.4	52.1	87	96	4	24,064	31
Lycksele	2,186	1,627	54.2	44.9	77	76	24	20,700	27
Norrmalm	2,059	1,532	54.8	44.2	89	94	6	27,352	36
Södermalm	1,702	1,296	58.6	40.9	79	81	19	22,691	30
Villaryd	2,334	1,780	56.3	42.9	81	86	14	23,861	32
Source: SVT

== Transport ==
There is an airport just south of Lycksele, from which one can reach Stockholm in about 80 minutes.

Previously, the railroad between Umeå and Storuman was the main means of transportation, but its significance has diminished and passenger traffic was discontinued. There are now daily buses to towns like Umeå, Storuman and Tärnaby. In August 2011, passenger train services between Lycksele and Umeå were re-established.

The European route E12, also known as Blå vägen ("The Blue Road") winds along the Ume River and passes through Lycksele.

== Sister cities ==
Lycksele Municipality has three sister cities:

- Mosjøen, Norway
- Ähtäri, Finland
- Lovozero, Russia
