= Forsby–Köping limestone cableway =

Coordinates: 59°19′N 16°4′E

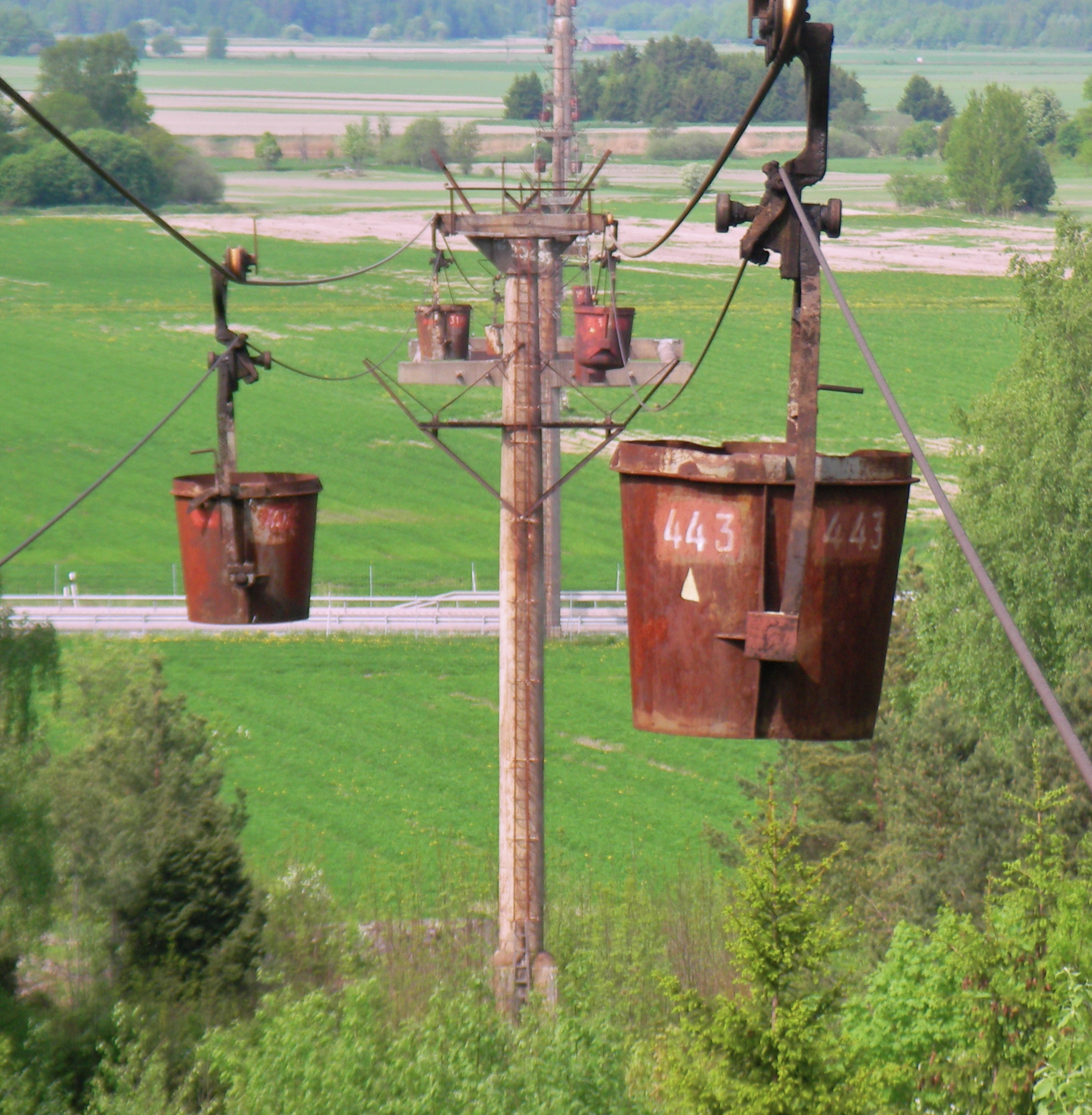
The limestone cableway running north towards Arboga river

The Forsby–Köping limestone cableway, commonly referred to in Swedish as Kalklinbanan, was a 42 km aerial tramway running from Forsby in Vingåker municipality to industrial town Köping in central Sweden. Its final destination was the factory at the port of Köping, where cement was manufactured until 1978, and later various limestone derivatives. The cableway was Europe's longest at the time of construction. It was later superseded by a handful of longer cableways, notably the Norsjö aerial tramway, all of which were demolished during the 1960s–1980s. It was taken out of service in 1997 but kept in working order. By that time all longer industrial cableways had been demolished making it at present the world's longest cableway in working order.

Despite opposition from industrial heritage groups, the cableway was demolished starting 26 June 2013. The fully functioning cableway ran one last time as carriages were removed from the track and sold for scrap. Cables were removed later the same year and poles demolished towards the winter of 2013/14. By 2015, most of the cableway was removed, except for a segment remaining as an industrial‐heritage monument.

== Construction ==
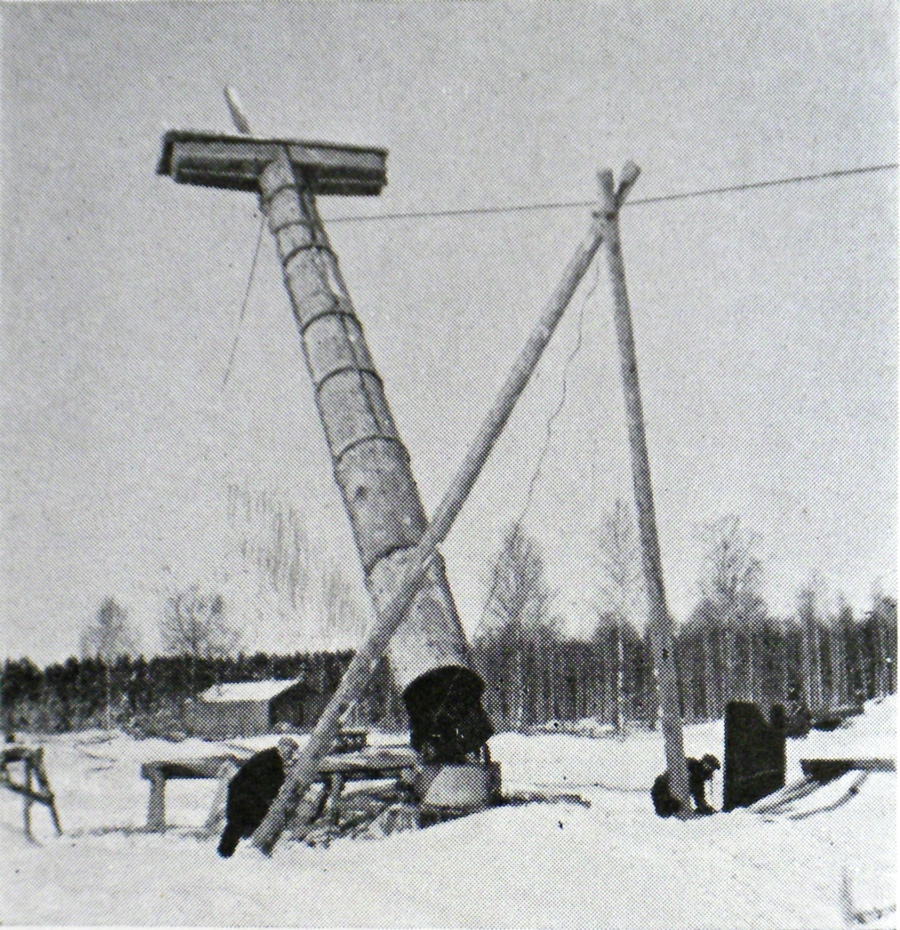
Casting of concrete trestle in 1940

The cableway was built in 1939 by AB Nordströms Linbanor for Skånska Cement AB in concert with the construction of its Forsby limestone plant and cement factory in Köping. A 300 people workforce completed the installation at a pace of 2,1 km/month. The choice of a cableway was determined after evaluation of a number of modes of transportation, and special care was taken not to interfere with the surrounding landscape, particularly at the lake Hjälmaren strait.

Construction by numbers
Resource	Amount
Concrete	15.000 m³
Rebar	1.000 metric tons
Workforce	300 people
Man-hours	800.000
Total expense	4 million SEK

The system consists of three types of stations: Power stations with 135 hp (101 kW) electric motors, powering one or both connecting sections. Terminal stations in Forsby and Köping where the limestone was loaded/unloaded also functioned as power stations. Angle stations lack motors and only change the angle of the cable track by splicing together two sections powered from their respective other sides. Station buildings have an iron frame, wooden walls and roof constructed from asbestos cement. The pulling cables go in endless loops between stations, and kept taut by counterweights in towers in the power stations. The heavier carrying cable is divided into four runs along each section, connected by tension stations. These stations are comparatively small, simple structures regulating cable tension along the way.

== Operation ==
Limestone from the Forsby quarry was coarsely crushed and sorted by hand. Passing cableway cars were automatically loaded from a storage silo, after the passage to Köping cars were automatically unloaded, the limestone was fine-ground and ready for cement production. The cableway is supported by 235 concrete trestles and split into 4 sections with stations in Forsby och Köping as well as the angle stations at Granhammar, Malmberga and Knotberget. Of these trestles, 10 are tall "special trestles" at the crossing of the Hjälmaren strait and Arboga River, the tallest being 45 m. Power stations are located in Köping, Malmberga and Forsby. 12 tension stations line the track, and 8 road or railway intersections are protected by steel nets. The limestone was transported in 750 bucket-shaped cars, each carrying 1200 kg for a total capacity of 90 metric tons per hour.

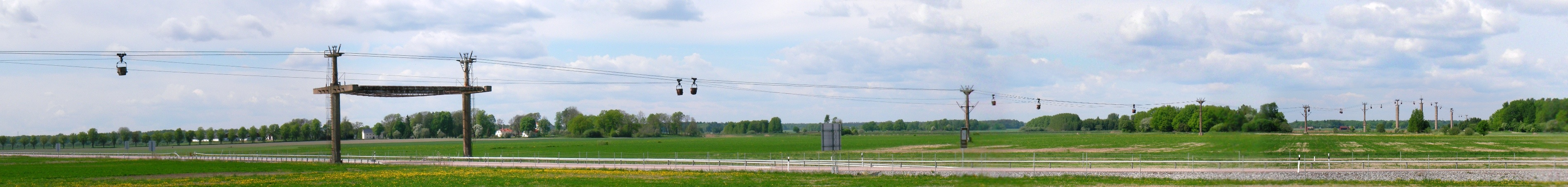
The limestone cableway crossing European route E20 and Arboga River

== Decommissioning ==
In June 1997 the track was taken out of service and Forsby limestone is since transported by truck. By then, the cableway had transported a total of 25 million tons of limestone and been in operation for 56 years. This made the Forsby–Köping cableway the longest duration operating in the 10 km-class of cableways (closest second is the Mariquita-Manizales cableway, which was run for 39 years). The limestone cableway was preserved as industrial heritage, with test runs each year and subjected to some degree of maintenance. In 2003 it was awarded Industrial Memorial of the Year by Svenska industriminnesföreningen.

November 2009 current owner Nordkalk announced that demolition was being planned, following unsuccessful attempts to transfer it to a suitable caretaker. In December 2011, evaluation for classification as cultural or world heritage was proposed, but has not been carried out as of early 2013. Despite this effort, demolition applications were submitted to the concerned municipalities in June 2012, and was planned to take place during the autumn.

The International Committee for the Conservation of the Industrial Heritage – TICCIH – wrote an open letter in February 2013 addressed to key organizations including the Swedish National Heritage Board. The letter urged the authorities involved to avert demolition and assure its preservation.

== See also ==
- Norsjö ropeway, the longest ropeway, also using the same construction.
- Ropeway conveyor
