= Boliden =

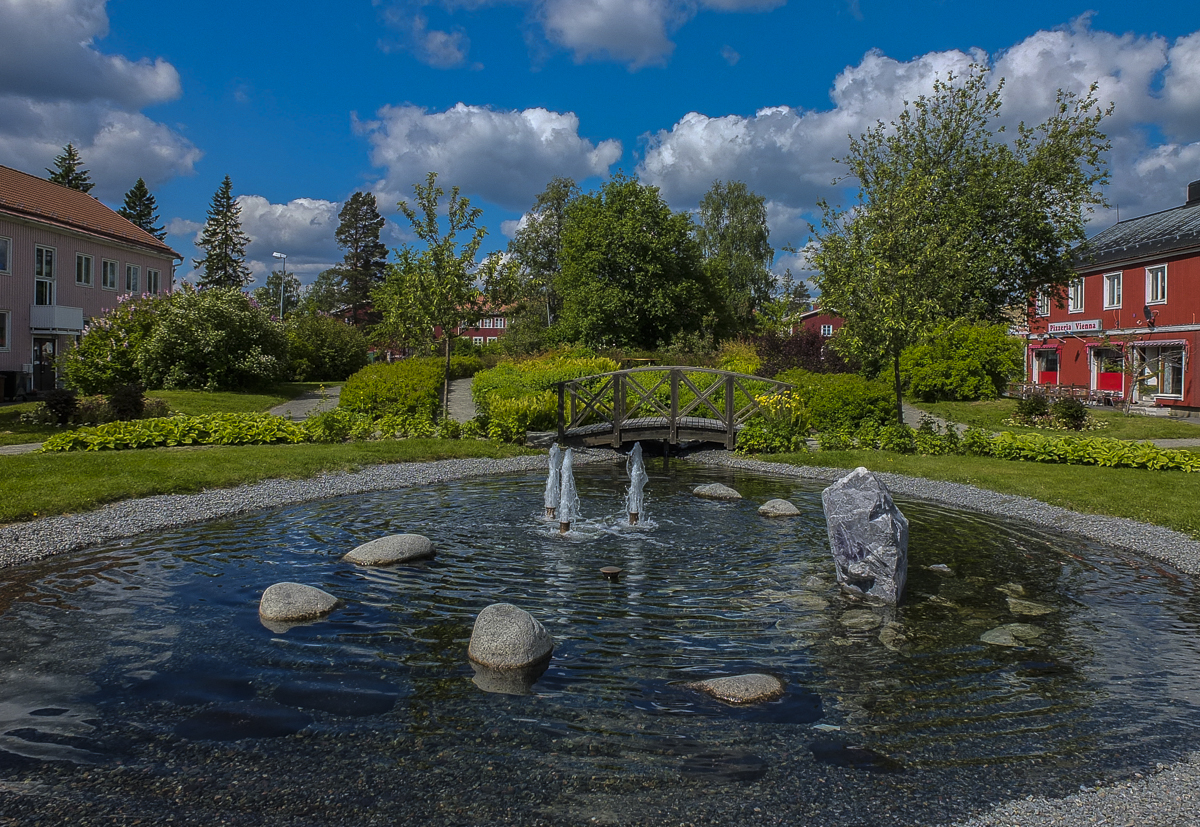

- Location within Västerbotten Location within Sweden
- Coordinates: 64°52′N 20°23′E
- Country: Sweden
- Province: Västerbotten
- County: Västerbotten County
- Municipality: Skellefteå Municipality

Area
  - Total: 1.94 km^{2} (0.75 sq mi)

Population (31 December 2010)
  - Total: 1,566
  - Density: 805/km^{2} (2,080/sq mi)
- Time zone: UTC+1 (CET)
  - Summer (DST): UTC+2 (CEST)

Boliden is a locality situated in Skellefteå Municipality, Västerbotten County, Sweden with 1,566 inhabitants in 2010. It lies 28,5 kilometers from Skellefteå City.

This is where Boliden AB was founded in early 20th century after the findings in the mine that was called the Boliden mine.
