= Veta La Palma =

Estate in Andalusia, Spain

Veta la Palma is an estate (finca) in Andalusia, Spain. It is located on an island in the Guadalquivir river, 10 miles (16 km) inland from the Atlantic Ocean in Seville province of Spain. Prior to the break up of the estate in 2023 it consisted of 11,000 hectares, one of the biggest private properties in the province of Seville. It is recognised for its ecological importance, being included in Doñana Natural Park, the buffer zone of Doñana National Park. The two parks, national and natural, have been classified as a single natural landscape.

== History ==
Isla Mayor, as the "nerve centre" of the marshlands (Las Marismas) of the lower Guadalquivir, has seen a long process of transformation over time due to both the natural evolution caused by silting and the effects of human activity. The first attempts to exploit the resources of the Isla Mayor date back to the 19th century, but it was not till the third decade of the twentieth century that farming really began in the area, thanks to a project carried between 1926 and 1928 by the British company Islas del Rio Guadalquivir Limited.

The village and municipality were named as Villafranco del Guadalquivir in honour of the caudillo General Franco; in 2000 the name was changed to Isla Mayor by popular vote. During the Franco years the Veta la Palma Estate was owned by Argentinians who raised beef cattle. In 1982, the Empresa Agropecuaria del Guadalquivir, owner of the estate since 1966, was acquired by the Hisparroz, the leading Spanish company in rice seed production. Though it may have seemed a good idea to plant rice, agricultural activities were soon prohibited in much of the finca under Spain's new environmental legislation. Another plan was needed. After a brief introductory period, in 1990 a subsidiary Pesquerías Isla Mayor SL (PIMSA) was authorised by General Directorate for Fisheries of the Andalusian Regional Government, following the Rector Plan for the Use and Management of the Doñana National Park (PRUG), to introduce fish farming to the area.

== Fish Farming ==
Part of the estate was used as a fish farm from the 1990s onwards and attracted international attention. This aquaculture operation was carried out by PIMSA. Initially using 1,500 acres of the estate, the project was gradually extended to reach 8,000 acres. These were flooded with high quality waters which provided a habitat to the significant population of fish and crustaceans which reared on the farm. A further 8,000 acres were dedicated to the dry crops and 1,000 acres to the cultivation of rice. The remaining 12,000 acres were maintained to preserve the original biotope of the marshlands.

It produced 1,200 tons of sea bass, bream, grey mullet, and shrimp each year. The fish food used in the farm's semi-extensive systems (fish in the extensive balsas were left to feed on naturally occurring organisms) contained no dioxins, antibiotics or GMOs. Given its 32 km^{2} area, this gave a yearly yield of 37 tons per square kilometer. However, this project reportedly became commercially unviable because of factors such as difficulty maintaining water quality and predation of the fish by wildlife.

== Ecology ==
The fisheries attracted more than 200 species of migratory bird, many of which were endangered.

Under environmental legislation this fish farm had to support a set of services for hydrology and ecology of the marshlands. The extensive and semi-extensive aquaculture attracted a range of nesting and migratory species of birds. The total bird population of Veta la Palma can reach a figure of 600,000 covering some 250 different species, of which some 50 suffer some degree of threat in other areas. The wetland habitat re-created artificially on the estate plays an essential part in the conservation of birds by guaranteeing food both for species which complete their development cycle from birth on the island before migrating and those which, during the course of migration between Africa and Europe stay on the area temporarily to find food.

The area used for fish farming was acquired by the Junta de Andalucia in 2023 in order for it to be managed for conservation purposes.
