= Marisma de Hinojos =

Salt marsh in Spain

The Marisma de Hinojos is a salt marsh about 50 km north of the city of Cádiz, It is in the province of Huelva, in the autonomous region of Andalusia, Spain. "Marisma de Hinojos" means 'salt marsh of Hinojos', being Hinojos a town which name means 'fennel plants'. It lies within Doñana National Park (Parque Nacional de Doñana) on the Costa de la Luz.

It is one of the sites suggested for the location of the lost city of Atlantis.
