= Doñana National Park =

National park in Andalucía, southern Spain

- Parque Nacional y Natural de Doñana
- IUCN category II (national park)
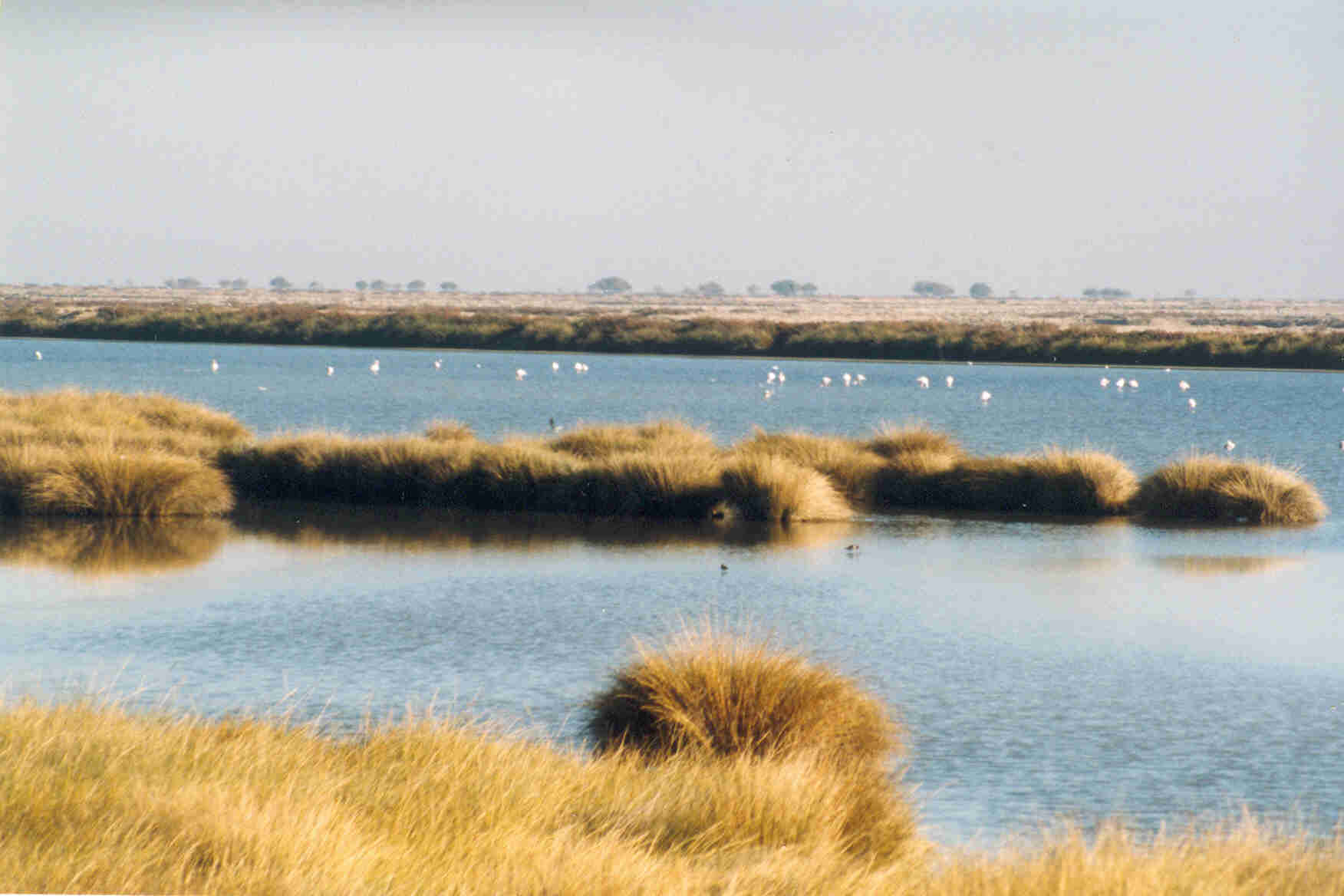
- Marshes of Doñana
- Location of Doñana
- Location: Huelva, Seville and Cádiz provinces - Andalucía, Spain
- Coordinates: 37°00′N 6°30′W
- Area: 543 km^{2} (210 sq mi)
- Established: 1969
- Visitors: 392,958 (in 2007)
- Governing body: National Parks Autonomous Agency and Regional Government of Andalusia

UNESCO World Heritage Site
- Criteria: Natural: (vii), (ix), (x)
- Designated: 1994 (18th session)
- Reference no.: 685
- Region: Europe and North America
- Extensions: 2005

Ramsar Wetland
- Official name: Doñana
- Designated: 5 April 1982
- Reference no.: 234

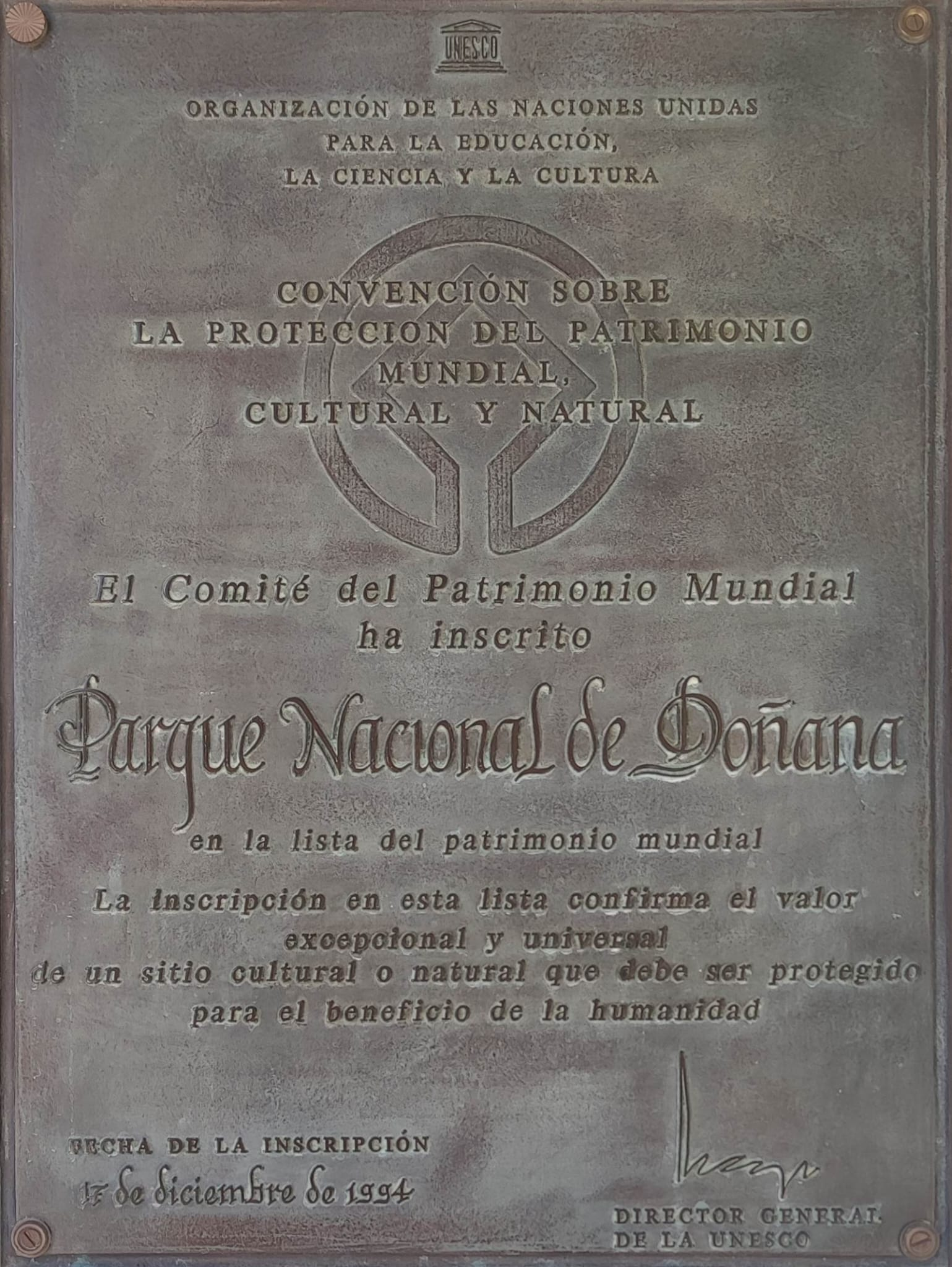
UNESCO World Heritage plaque

Doñana National Park or Parque Nacional y Natural de Doñana is a natural reserve in Andalusia, southern Spain, in the provinces of Huelva (most of its territory within the municipality of Almonte), Cádiz and Seville. It covers 543 km^{2} (209.65 mi^{2}), of which 135 km^{2} (52.12 mi^{2}) are a protected area. It is named after Doña Ana de Silva y Mendoza, wife of the 7th Duke of Medina Sidonia.

The park is an area of marshes, shallow streams, and sand dunes in Las Marismas, the delta where the Guadalquivir flows into the Atlantic Ocean. It was established as a nature reserve in 1969 when the World Wildlife Fund (WWF) joined with the Spanish government and purchased a section of marshes to protect it. The eco-system has been under constant threat by the draining of the marshes, the use of river water to boost agricultural production by irrigating land along the coast, water pollution by upriver mining, and the expansion of tourist facilities.

Doñana National Park has a biodiversity that is unique in Europe, although there are some similarities to the Parc Naturel Régional de Camargue of the Camargue river delta in France, with which Doñana Park is twinned. The park features a great variety of ecosystems and shelters wildlife, including thousands of European and African migratory birds, fallow deer, Spanish red deer, wild boars, European badgers, Egyptian mongooses, and endangered species such as the Spanish imperial eagle and the Iberian lynx.

The Doñana nature reserve includes both the Doñana National Park, established in 1969, and the Natural Park, created in 1989 and expanded in 1997, creating a buffer zone of protection under the management of the regional government. The two parks, national and natural, have since been classified as a single natural landscape. Due to its strategic location between the continents of Europe and Africa and its proximity to the Strait of Gibraltar, Doñana's large expanse of salt marsh is a breeding ground as well as a transit point for thousands of European and African birds (aquatic and terrestrial), and hosts many species of migratory waterfowl during the winter, typically up to 200,000 individuals. Over 300 different species of birds may be sighted there annually. Considered the largest nature reserve in Europe, several different scientific institutions have monitoring stations within its boundaries to ensure appropriate development of adjacent lands and conservation of the threatened species that inhabit it. The area was declared a World Heritage Site by UNESCO in 1994; in 2006, the park recorded 376,287 visitors.

== Geology and geomorphology ==
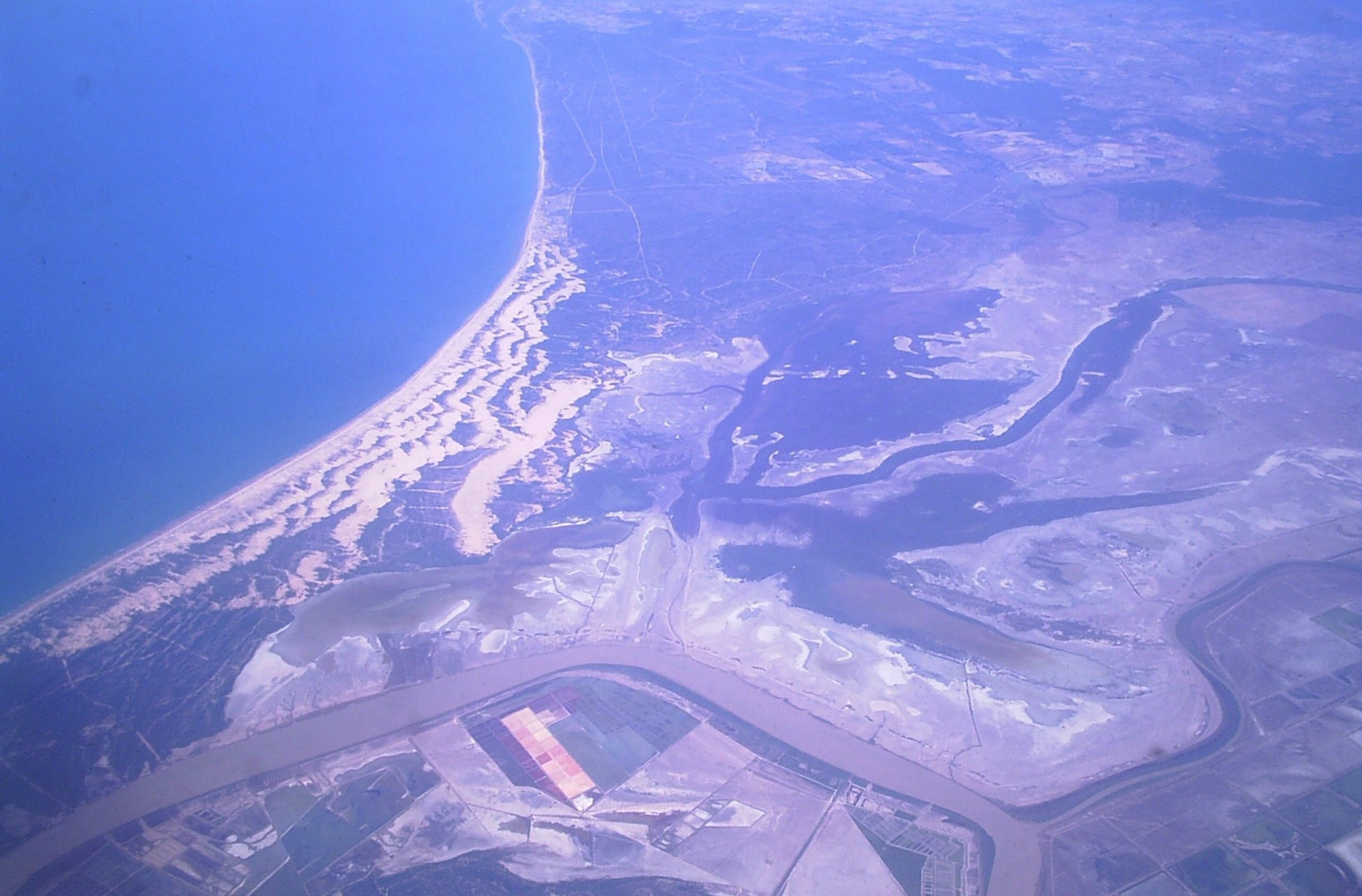
Doñana - Aerial view of Doñana National Park and surrounding areas

The geological profile of Doñana National Park reflects the development over several hundred thousand years of a deep aquifer and geomorphological features that have enhanced the biodiversity of the wildlife habitats presently found there. After the end of the last glacial period, the area was covered by freshwater and brackish marshes, ponds and sand dunes, with some marine intrusions caused by high-energy events such as tsunamis and large storms. A period of comparatively rapid rise in global sea level during the first part of the Flandrian interglacial was associated with the melting of the paleoglaciers, and reached its maximum level 6,500–7,000 years ago. At this time, Doñana National Park and the surrounding areas were flooded, and a lagoon, later called Lacus Ligustinus by the Romans, was formed. The pace of infilling of the lagoon has increased over the last 6,000 years, along with accelerated growth of sandspits and the creation of new inland marshes and wetlands. The extensive marshes of Doñana National Park now have a flat topography, with some inland depressions occupied by temporary or permanent wetlands, locally called 'lucios'. The whole area is protected by the Doñana spit, a wide sandy littoral barrier with mobile dune systems growing toward the southeast.

== History ==
=== Antiquity ===
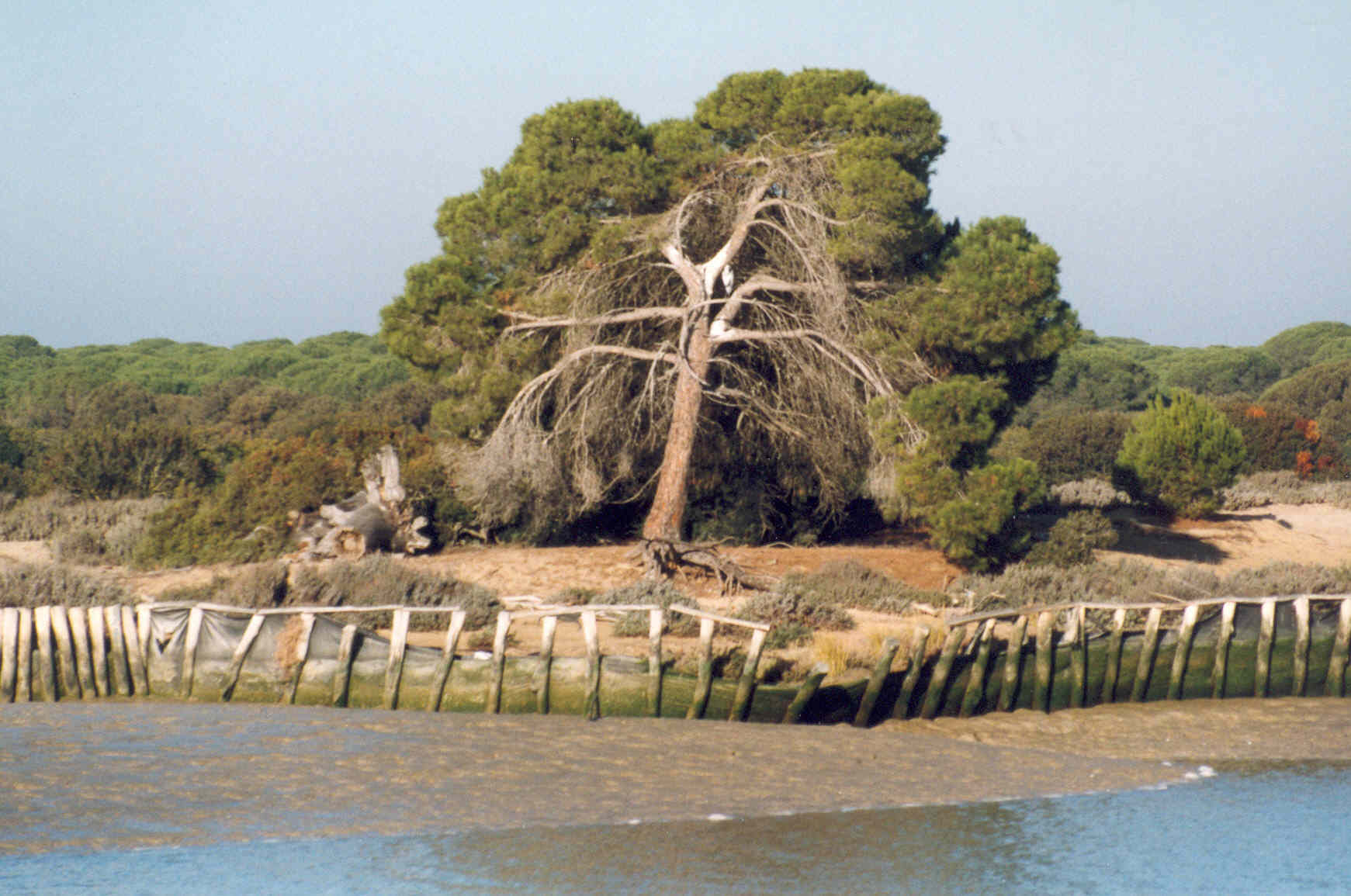
Banks of the Guadalquivir river in Doñana National Park (Almonte)

Although the topography of Doñana is a relatively new land feature as measured on the geological time scale, remains of Neolithic tools have been found in the area. Various ancient civilisations may have had a presence there as long as 2,800 years ago, including the Phoenicians, the Phocaean Greeks and the Tartessians, but archaeological remains attesting to such have not been found. In 1923, the German archaeologist Adolf Schulten, accompanied by Adolf Lammerer and George Bonsor, searched for the location of the ancient Tartessian capital in Almonte, where the Doñana dunes are, but found nothing of interest. These excavations were carried out at Cerro del Trigo and funded by the Duke of Tarifa and Denia, then owner of Doñana. Nevertheless, in 1978 Schulten found the stele of Villamanrique at the nearby town of Villamanrique de la Condesa. Surveys were made in 2007 in the Hinojos salt marsh, or "Marisma de Hinojos", of Huelva province, in an effort to discover traces of the mythical city Atlantis. Noteworthy finds included the remains of Roman settlements, dating from the 2nd through the 5th centuries AD, which had been primarily engaged in fishing and fish salting or the preparation of garum. The Guadalquivir Marshes (Las Marismas del Guadalquivir), an area of marshy lowlands near the left bank of the mouth of the Guadalquivir, was then a large inland lake known as the Lacus Ligustinus in Latin. The lake slowly infilled with deposited sediment, gradually giving way to the current marshes.

=== Middle Ages ===
Alfonso X the Wise

In 1262, after conquering the vassal kingdom of Niebla, King Alfonso X established a Real Cazadero (royal hunting preserve) in the Las Rocinas forest, between the Rio Tinto and the Guadalquivir, partly due to the abundance of deer there, as well as the small sanctuary of Santa Olalla, since disappeared, on the Arroyo de la Rocina.

In 1297, his son Sancho IV granted Guzmán el Bueno the Lordship of Sanlúcar, consisting of the territory located behind Arenas Gordas on the left bank of the Guadalquivir estuary, and which remained in the hands of the House of Medina-Sidonia for over six centuries. The noble house was established in 1369, when Henry II of Castile granted the fourth Lord of Sanlúcar the County of Niebla. In 1493 the Catholic Monarchs donated part of the land of the present village of El Rocío to the royal secretary, whose son later sold it to the town of Almonte. Previously, new breeding stock had been introduced among the local populations of wild boar and deer, while wolf hunting was encouraged for the benefit of cattle and horse ranching.

In the region of Niebla, specifically at Las Rocinas, the land is flat, covered by thickets, and wild boars are always to be found there... ...one may not traverse this ground in the winter, which is generally very wet, except during a drought, nor in summer because it is then so dry and miserably uncomfortable. ~Alfonso XI in his Libro de la Montería (The Book of Hunting), written between 1342 and 1348

=== Early modern ===
Nearly a century later, Alonso Pérez de Guzmán y Sotomayor, 7th Duke of Medina Sidonia and commander of the Spanish Armada, bought back part of the land. His wife, Ana de Silva y Mendoza, daughter of the Princess of Eboli, moved to a country retreat there called "Coto de Doña Ana" (Doña Ana Game Preserve), which was the origin of the current name "Doñana"; the house was renovated years later as a palace. Reference to the use of Coto Donana as a hunting lodge is made in the first verses of the La Fábula de Polifemo y Galatea (Fable of Polyphemus and Galatea), which the lyric poet Luis de Góngora dedicated to the Count of Niebla, and in which he requests that the nobles suspend their hunting exploits to hear his verses. In 1624, King Philip IV stayed at the estate for several days as a guest of the 9th Duke of Medina Sidonia, and joined in some large hunts. He brought with him a great variety of comestibles, which included such luxuries as snow from the mountains for the frequent banquets he held in honor of the duke. In 1797 Francisco Goya stayed in the palace as a guest of his patrons, the 15th Duke of Medina-Sidonia and his wife, the 13th Duchess of Alba. Here Goya created his Álbum A, a collection of drawings, and apparently painted his famous portraits, La Maja Vestida ("The Clothed Maja") and La Maja Desnuda ("The Naked Maja"), rumoured to portray the duchess.

=== Late modern, creation of the National Park ===
After 1854, with the publishing of a discussion of the area in a treatise called "Avifauna de Doñana: Catálogo de las aves observadas en algunas provincias andaluzas" ("Avifauna of Doñana: Catalogue of the birds observed in some Andalusian provinces"), by Antonio Machado y Nunez, the public began to appreciate its ecological value for the many different species of wildlife found there. Consequently, it was visited by British naturalists and hunters including Abel Chapman and Walter J. Buck, both of whom wrote books that alerted a wider audience in Europe to the strategic importance of Doñana for migratory birds travelling to Africa. Later, when José Joaquín Álvarez de Toledo y Caro (1865-1915) became the 19th Duke of Medina Sidonia, he inherited large debts and to pay them was forced to sell off various assets, including the Coto de Doñana, which he sold for 750,000 pesetas, finally detaching it from the noble house.

When the sherry baron William Garvey bought Doñana from the Duke in 1901, the estate was abandoned and in a state of ruin. Garvey restored the palace to its former splendour, and upon his death it passed to his brother Joseph and his niece Maria Medina y Garvey, who was married to the Duke of Tarifa, a forest engineer. In 1934 it passed to the sister of the Duchess of Tarifa, Blanca Medina and Garvey, who was married to the Marquis of Borghetto. In 1942, the Marquis sold it to a company formed by Salvador Noguera, Manuel Gonzalez and the Marquis of Mérito. Fifty years later the park was consolidated as a natural area.

=== Conservation ===
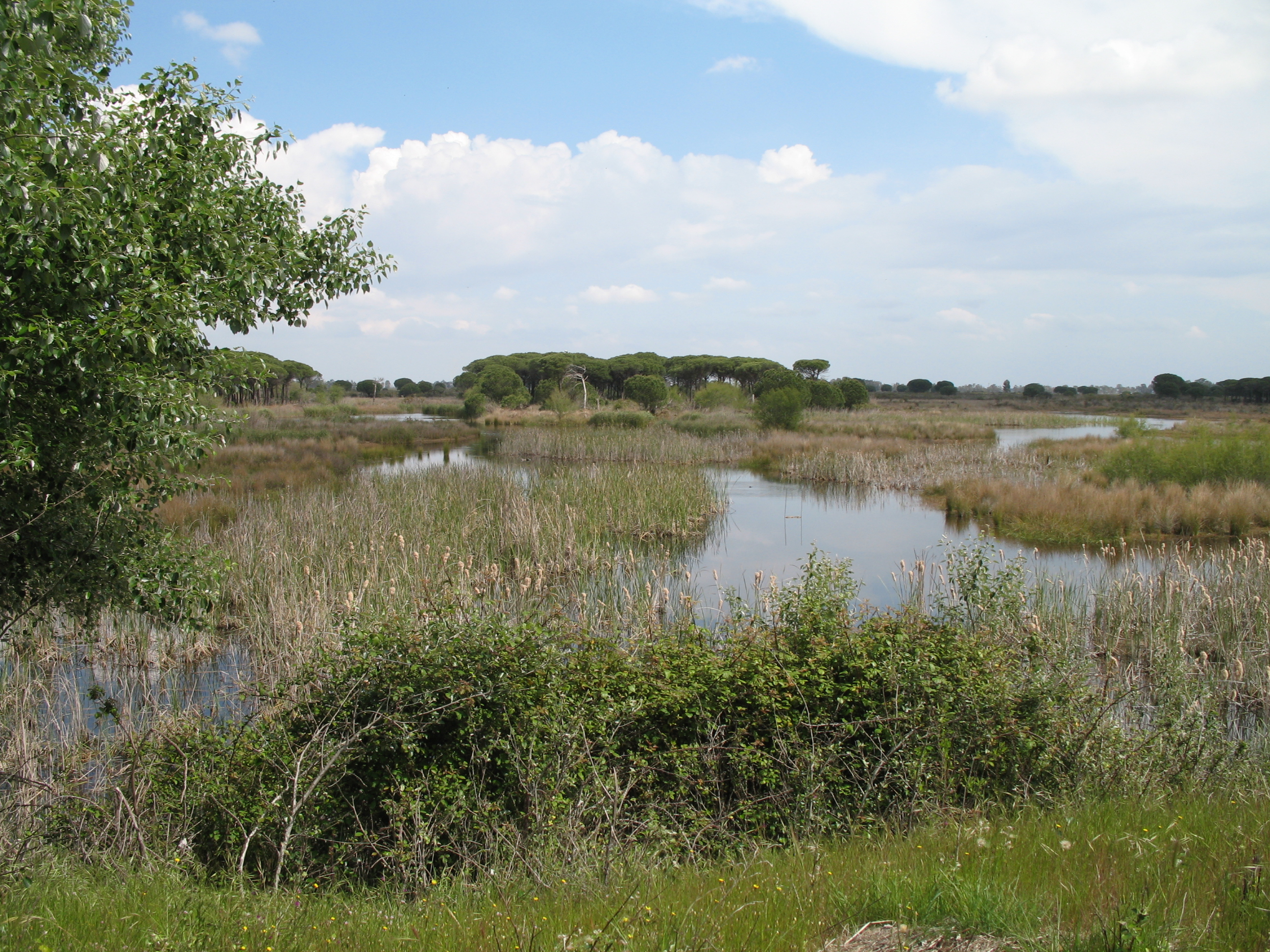
View of Doñana National Park from visitors' centre at El Acebuche (Almonte)

The Spanish businessman Mauricio González-Gordon y Díez, Marquis of Bonanza, whose family owned a large estate in Doñana, became interested in its ecosystems and their birdlife, and invited ornithologists from all over Europe to visit. In 1952, the Spanish ornithologists José Antonio Valverde and Francisco Bernis visited the property, with González-Gordon serving as their guide. Valverde and the González-Gordon family saw that the wetlands, with their richly diverse wildlife, were threatened by the Spanish government's proposals to drain them for farming and the planting of eucalyptus trees. Mauricio, together with his father, asked Bernis to try and influence Spanish dictator Francisco Franco into abandoning the plans. The trio wrote a memorandum which was presented to Franco himself by Mauricio's father Manuel. By November 1953 Bernis had finished a report on the status of the Doñana which showed that the area had exceptional ecological value. The group sought and obtained international support for their goals. The efforts of González-Gordon to dissuade Franco exposed him to some danger, but the Franco government conceded and the drainage plans were aborted.

Valverde led the first organised scientific expedition to the Donana in 1957, joined by the British naturalists Guy Mountfort, Roger Tory Peterson, and Sir Julian Huxley. A group of European conservation experts – including Guy Mountfort, Max Nicholson and Luc Hoffmann –then demonstrated the crucial importance of the area as a stopover for birds migrating between the European and African continents. In 1959, the Gonzalez family sold part of their land in Doñana for development of the Matalascañas resort. This alarmed European conservationists, leading various institutions and anonymous donors to offer to buy part of the property. Valverde, Hoffman, and Nicholson, in partnership with the British Nature Conservancy, formed an association that organised an international drive for funds to expand the park. The campaign raised two million Swiss Francs to buy 7,000 hectares of land for annexation to that already donated by González-Gordon. Finally, in 1963 the Spanish government and WWF bought part of the territory and created the first Doñana preserve, and in 1964 they established the Doñana Biological Station and the Spanish National Research Council (Consejo Superior de Investigaciones Científicas - CSIC) to study the biodiversity of Doñana and other Spanish ecosystems.

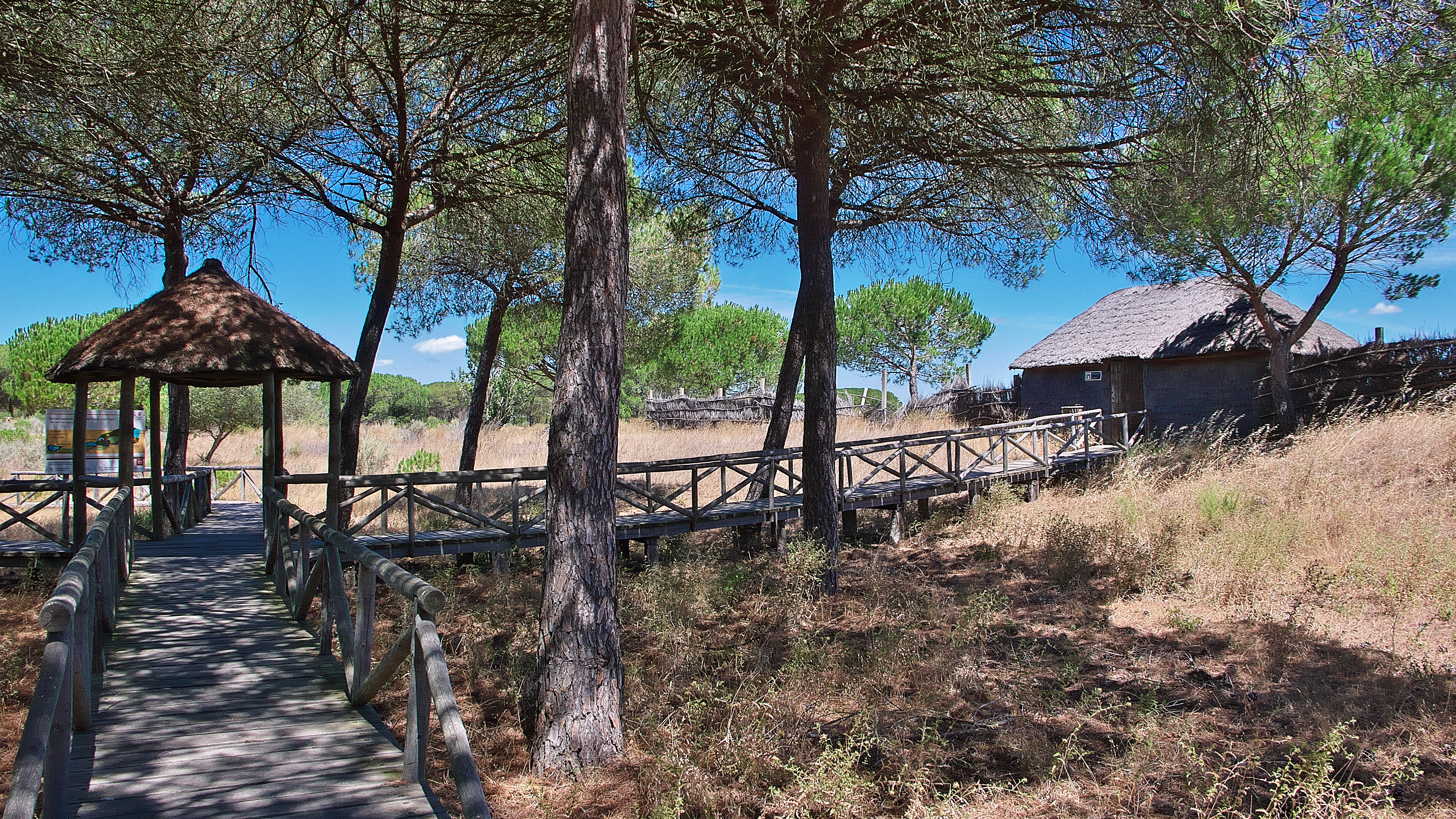
El Porrón observatory (Almonte)

In 1969, the WWF again joined forces with the Spanish government to purchase another section of the Guadalquivir Delta marshes and establish the Doñana National Park. That same year the Doñana National Park was created by decree, part of whose territory was owned by the Ministry of Economy and Competitiveness (Ministerio de Economía y Competitividad) and part still in private hands. Ten years later the protected area was expanded and the so-called "Preparque Doñana" was created. In 1980, UNESCO recognised the Doñana National Park as a Biosphere Reserve of 77,260 hectares. The Core Zone consists of 50,720 hectares in the National Park of Doñana. The buffer zone is 54,250 hectares in the Natural Park of Doñana. The altitude ranges from sea level to 40 meters above sea level. Unesco considers Doñana of world significance, based on the variety of its ecosystems and the wide number of species they harbour. In 1982 it was included in the list of wetlands of the Ramsar Convention, and in 1989 the Regional Government of Andalusia converted the Preparque into the Doñana Natural Park. In 1994 it was listed by Unesco as a World Heritage Site, enabling the establishment of programs to preserve and manage the area. Historically, these vital wetlands have been constantly threatened by schemes to increase local agricultural output and tourism. WWF still supports the Doñana, and is fighting proposals to drain the marshes and syphon off water for irrigation of agricultural land along the coast and expansion of tourist facilities.

In 1998, the Aznalcóllar disaster occurred when a holding dam burst at the Los Frailes mine owned by Boliden-Apirsa (formerly Andaluza de Piritas, S.A.), the Spanish subsidiary of Boliden, releasing a flood of toxic sludge that entered the Guadiamar river, the main water source for the park. In 2000, after this major environmental catastrophe, the Spanish Ministry of Environment promoted the "Doñana 2005" program, aimed at regenerating the marshes. In 2006 the responsibilities of maintaining the park were transferred to the Government of Andalusia by the Royal Decree of 9 June; the functions and services of the Nature Conservation administration thus transferred to the Andalusian state were widened, and Doñana National Park and the Natural Park became the "Natural area of Doñana", a single territory divided into areas with different levels of environmental protection. In 2008 this park was twinned with the Regional Natural Park Camargue in France, with which it shares anthropological and ethnographic aspects.

During his tenure, the Spanish Prime Minister Felipe González began using Doñana as a vacation retreat, setting a precedent for his successors. In 2010, 9200 hectares of land on the coastline were expropriated by the former Ministry of the Environment for protection. In July 2012, Unesco approved the extension of the Biosphere Reserve of Doñana from 77,260 hectares to over 255,000 hectares and enabled compliance with the guidelines of the Man and Biosphere Program. This created a transition zone where the socio-economic interests of the various municipalities in the Doñana region are represented. In 2019, the police closed tens of illegal wells operated largely by fruit farmers around the park which had for many years been draining water away from the park's water table. In the same year, the EU commission decided to take Spain to the European Court of Justice (EJC) for violating EU conservation rules. The court ruled in favour of the EU commission, stating that Spain has not fulfilled its obligations concerning the prevention of illegal water extraction as well as failed to take necessary measures to stop significant modifications of the park's landscape. In 2023 the Junta de Andalucia sought to approve some of the illegal strawberry cultivation taking place near the park, but was blocked by the central government. The Junta reached an agreement with the national government whereby there would be more support for dryland farming. It also made an effort to mitigate damage to the national park by the acquisition of 7,000 ha of an estate called Veta La Palma. This property includes lagoons which had been used for a failed fishing farming enterprise within the natural park and which at the time of purchase were seen as a potential extension to the national park.

In January 2024 the bird count was the lowest on record, reflecting low water levels in the National Park. In 2025 there was more rainfall, increasing the area of the park under water. However, UNESCO was still concerned about the aquifer and there was still a threat of the national park being placed on the List of World Heritage in Danger.

== Climate ==
Doñana Park has a mild, typically Mediterranean climate, characterised by dry summers and relatively wet winters resulting from variations in the polar front and the subtropical ridge of high pressure. The rainy seasons are intermediate, occurring in spring and in autumn; the latter especially can produce torrential rains caused by the accumulation during the summer of heat in nearby large bodies of water, and the arrival of polar air masses. In winter, however, thermal anticyclones may occur locally. Temperatures are mild throughout the year, with maximum temperatures varying about 17 °C from winter to summer. The most significant feature of the climate is the three to five months of dry weather in the summer, when it is dominated by the subtropical anticyclone.

== Flora ==
There are many species of flora in the park: trees, including pines, flowers such as roses, and shrubs. Of special interest are the species Vulpia fontquerana, Tursica linaria, Juniperus macrocarpa (maritime juniper), Micropyropsis tuberosa, Hydrocharis morsus-ranae or Thorella verticillatinundata, many of them endangered. Non-native species such as eucalyptus, Acacia longifolia, Gomphocarpus fruticosus, Nicotiana glauca or Carpobrotus edulis (cat's claw) are removed by the park service.

Other notable species in the park, of the more than 875 indigenous to the Doñana ecosystems are: oleander, oak, the sea wallflower, sweet saltwort, the prickly tumbleweed, marram grass, heather, camarina, lavender, sea holly, reed, carnation, bulrush, common fern, sage-leaved rock rose, rushes, labiérnago (Phillyrea angustifolia), sea spurge, mastic, sedge, palm, pine, Scotch broom, rosemary, juniper, gorse, thyme, spurge and blackberries.

=== Flora of the transdunes ===
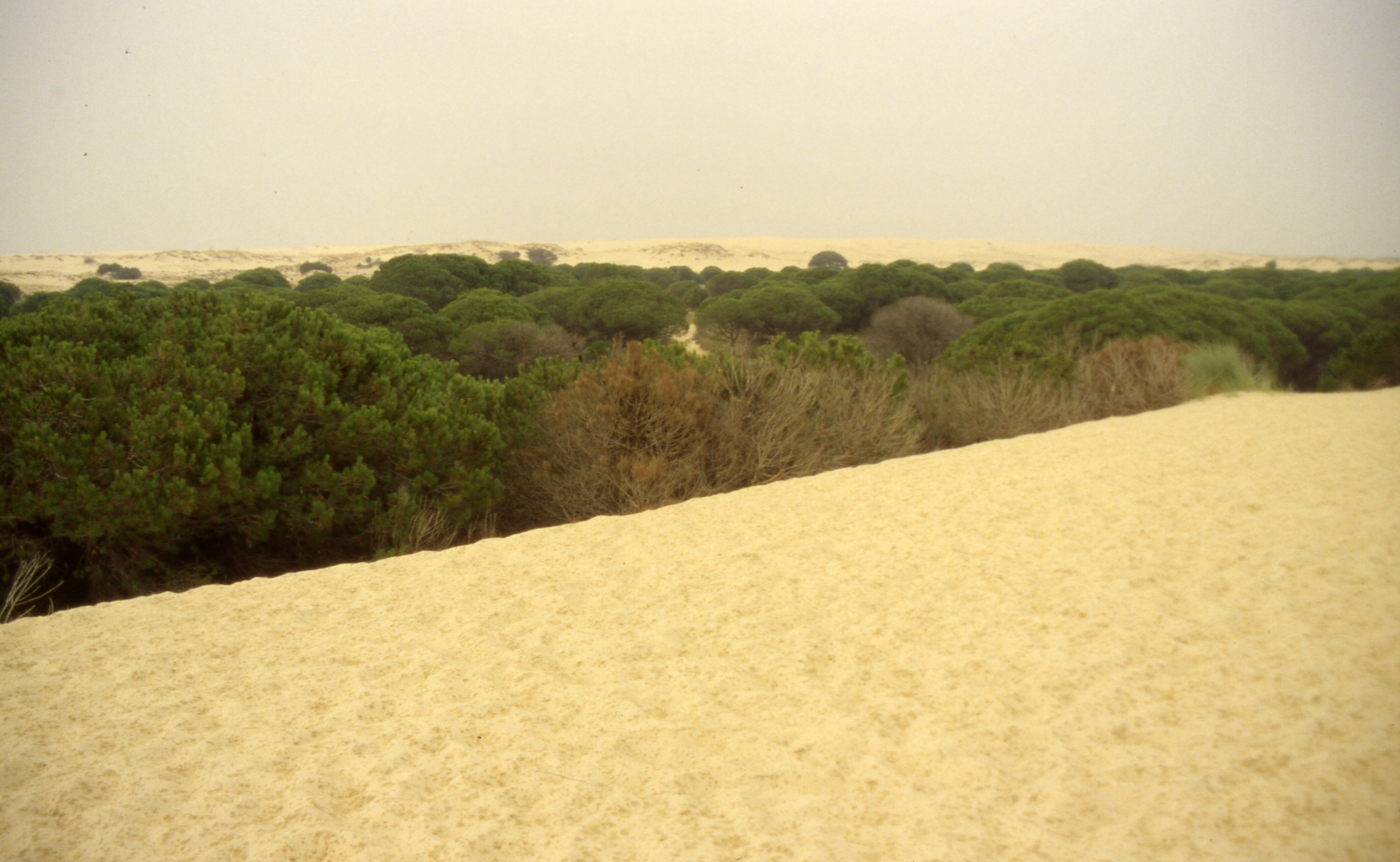
Dunes in the park

The ecosystem of the mobile dunes, also known as transdunes, which are formed by the prevailing south-west wind, is almost nonexistent elsewhere in the Iberian Peninsula. The harshness of this ecosystem is evident in the adaptations made by some plant species to its special conditions: the dunes of sand and soil are inconsistent. The gradual burial of vegetation, especially of trees that emerge then die, killed by the slow movement of sand, is one of the most well-known phenomena in the beach area of the park.

== Fauna ==
Animals recorded within the park include 142 species of fishes (20 of which are freshwater), 10 species of amphibians, 13 species of reptiles, 37 species of mammals and 360 non-marine bird species, of which 127 have bred in the park.

=== Fishes ===
Over 140 species of fishes are found in the park, including eight species endemic to the Iberian Peninsula: Iberian nase, Southern straight-mouth nase, and Iberian arch-mouthed nase, which are of least concern of extinction in the park; Southern Iberian spined loach, Andalusian barbel, and calandino, which are threatened in the park; Southern Iberian chub, which is critically endangered in the park; and the critically endangered Baetican toothcarp, which is endemic to the Doñana system. Five other non-endemic species are declining in the park, including vulnerable populations of black goby, black-striped pipefish, and greater pipefish, as well as critically endangered populations of twait shad and sea lamprey. Populations of European sea sturgeon, allis shad, and three-spined stickleback were previously found in the park, but are now locally extinct. Some of the most common native species in the park include big-scale sand smelt, common goby, and sand goby. There are ten introduced species in the park, including eight listed in the Spanish Catalogue of Exotic Invasive Species: common bleak, common carp, eastern mosquitofish, mummichog, largemouth bass, pumpkinseed, rainbow trout, and black bullhead. The non-invasive introduced species include goldfish and Prussian carp.

=== Reptiles ===
Reptiles found in Doñana Park include the European pond turtle, Spanish pond turtle, spur-thighed tortoise, Iberian worm lizard, Bedriaga's skink, western three-toed skink, common wall gecko, spiny-footed lizard, ocellated lizard, Carbonell's wall lizard, Andalusian wall lizard, Psammodromus manuelae, Spanish psammodromus, horseshoe whip snake, ladder snake, southern smooth snake, Montpellier snake, false smooth snake, viperine snake, grass snake, Lataste's viper, loggerhead turtle and leatherback turtle.

=== Birds ===
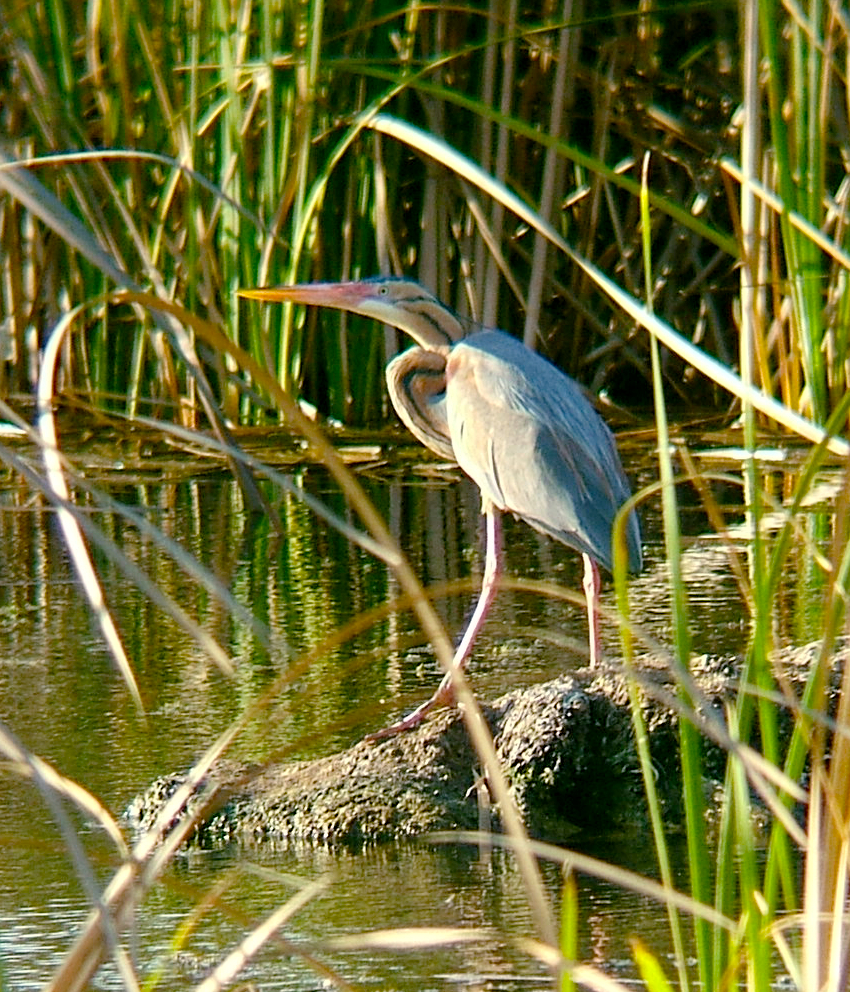
Purple heron

Over 300 species of bird have been recorded in the area, including range-restricted species such as Spanish imperial eagle, marbled teal, white-headed duck and red-knobbed coot. Wetland species include glossy ibis, western swamphen, ferruginous duck, Eurasian spoonbill, red-crested pochard, little and cattle egret, night and squacco heron and greater flamingo, whilst the surrounding areas can have hoopoe, Eurasian thick-knee, Spanish sparrow, Mediterranean short-toed lark and pin-tailed sandgrouse. The site also attracts many summer migrants, which can include purple heron, gull-billed tern, greater short-toed lark, short-toed eagle, European roller, western olivaceous warbler, Savi's warbler, little bittern, booted eagle, whiskered tern and rufous scrub robin.

=== Mammals ===
38 mammal species have been recorded, including twelve species of bat, red deer, European rabbit, European hedgehog, common genet, wildcat, wild boar, Iberian lynx, garden dormouse, Egyptian mongoose, greater white-toothed shrew, Eurasian otter, wood mouse, European polecat, red fox, European badger, Mediterranean pine vole, southwestern water vole and black rat.

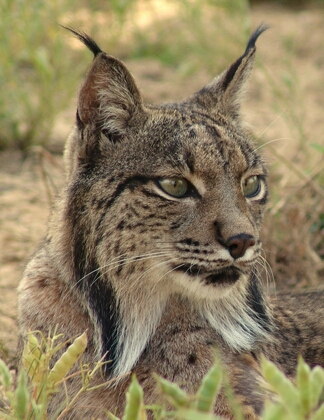
Iberian lynx, a symbolic species of the park

==== Iberian lynx ====
The Iberian lynx, whose habitat is restricted to the Iberian Peninsula, is the most endangered of the big cats. Precipitous drops in population counts led to its being declared a protected species in 1966. The only extant colonies of the Iberian lynx are in the Natural Parks of Sierra de Andujar and Cardena, Montoro, and Doñana with its surroundings; the other mainland colonies of former times are considered extinct. In Portugal recovery efforts to preserve its remaining habitat have resulted in the creation of the Sierra Malcata Natural Reserve.

The Acebuche Breeding Centre in Doñana has developed a captive breeding program which has achieved the survival of eleven individuals born in the centre, and of over thirty captured in the park, whose survival was otherwise doubtful. These conservation efforts are threatened by a high mortality rate among the cats and recurring violations of laws prohibiting cars from entering the park or driving on its roads, although, as some agencies have reported, the causes of death are not always clear. The precarious survival situation of this animal has become an emblematic symbol of the park for the general public.

==== Horses ====
In Doñana there are two indigenous breeds of horse: the Marismeño and the Retuertas; the latter is one of the oldest European breeds, dating to perhaps 1000 BC, and the only one living in the wild and isolated from other populations.

==== Camels ====
During the 19th and 20th centuries, a herd of feral dromedaries roamed the area. They may have been introduced during the Moorish Conquest of Spain in the 8th century, or they may have escaped from a herd introduced from the Canary Islands in 1829 by the Marquis de Molina as beasts of burden. By the 1950s, there were only eight individuals left, and these were threatened by poachers. By the early 1960s, there were only three, but more were released into the wild after being used in the filming of Lawrence of Arabia in 1962.

== Natural Park of Doñana: Preparque ==
- Abalario–Asperillo. The coastal area west of the national park from Matalascañas to Mazagon, forming a rectangle 25 km in length and reaching about 5 km inland, consists of a field of dunes, several ancient lagoons and wetlands, as well as a large forest of pine and eucalyptus trees. It shelters abundant wildlife, including the Iberian lynx. This zone includes the towns of Matalascañas and Mazagon, as well as the El Arenosillo test Centre, a rocket launch site for suborbital rockets, but its declaration as a national park blocked the construction of a large urban project west of Matalascañas.
- Preparque Norte–Pinares de Hinojos ("North Preparque Pinewoods of Hinojos"). It stretches north of the National Park from El Rocío to Hinojos, with areas of marsh and forest. The Pinar del Pinto of Coto del Rey, between Aznalcázar and Villamanrique de la Condesa, is home to several species of raptors.
- Preparque Este–Brazo de la Torre-Entremuros. An area east of the National Park, between Brazo de la Torre and the Guadalquivir, with marshes and caños (tidal channels that reach into the muddy marsh land). It attracts birds that inhabit Doñana during the summer and during those winters in which drought occurs. Part of the marshes have been converted to rice cultivation.

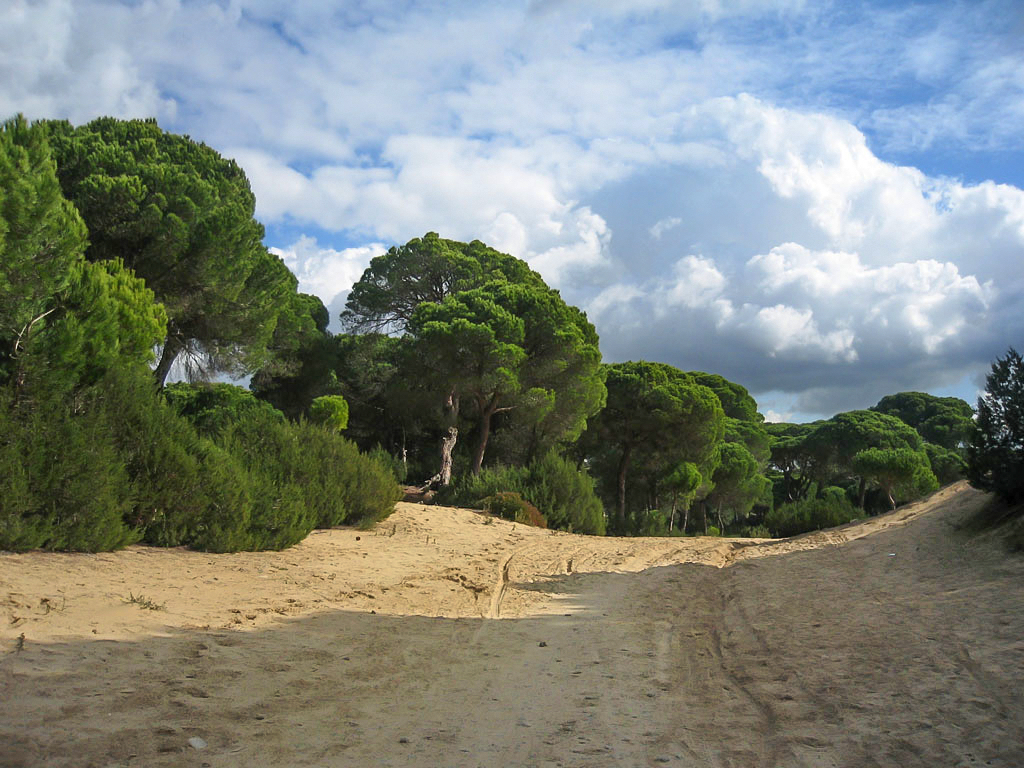
Pinar de la Algaida

- Pinar de la Algaida–Marismas de Bonanza. An area southeast of the National Park and north of Sanlúcar de Barrameda on the left bank of the Guadalquivir, that includes a large forest of pines and marshes in Salinas. These marshes are the only ones still flooded by the tides (all the others rely solely on freshwater streams and rain for replenishment), and consequently, flamingos and avocets are found in them. "Algaida" is a word of Arabic origin, meaning generally any place covered with trees and bushes. El Pinar de la Algaida is located near the henarllo, a sanctuary dedicated to the female deity Astarte, and the site of the Roman well of Caveros. Restocking has been practised at Algaida since the early 19th century, and it now contains a large colony of black kites.

== Environmental issues ==
After the Aznalcóllar Dam disaster of 1998, public awareness of the environmental risks to which the countryside is exposed has increased. Various impact studies and environmental groups have warned repeatedly of problems that threaten the region's flora, fauna, water and soil. While the pressure of urban isation and its various demands on local ecosystems has been a concern throughout the years, this is not the only associated risk factor. UNESCO has reviewed the nomination of the park for inclusion in its "List of World Heritage in Danger" several times, but has yet to add it.

=== Impact of infrastructure ===
There have been a number of problems related to infrastructure near the park. A project to build an oil pipeline between Extremadura and the port of Huelva has been critic ised by environmental groups, who allege it would significantly increase tanker traffic in the area with an associated risk of oil spills. Frequent dredging of the Guadalquivir to allow passage of ships to the port of Seville has been observed to cause serious disturbances in the biodynamics of the estuary. Adena, the Associación de defensa de la naturaleza ("Association for the defence of nature"), the Spanish branch of WWF, has linked the passage of these boats with the introduction of new animals to the local ecosystems, which occurs when they discharge ballast water containing exotic species.

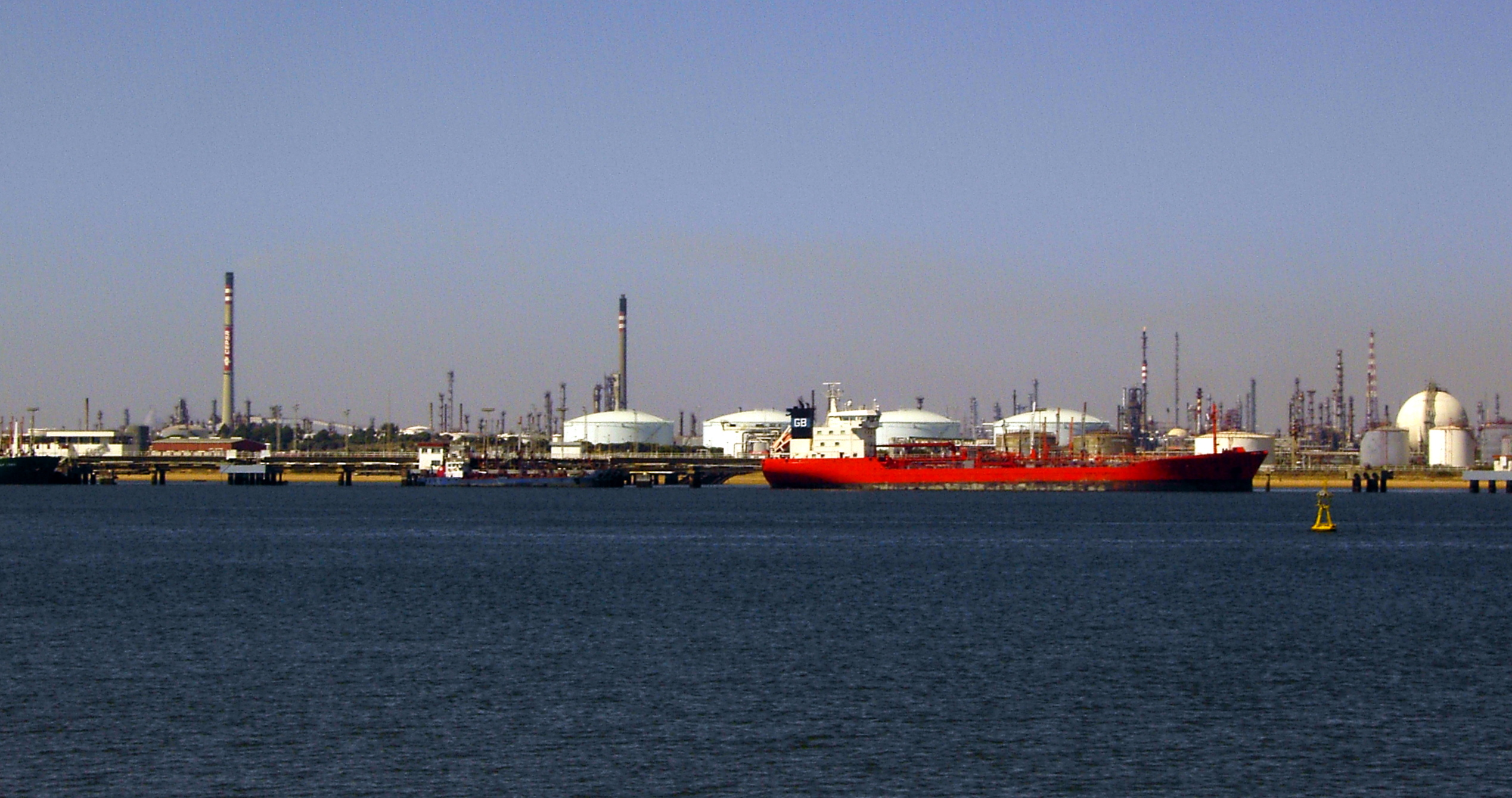
The Port of Huelva

The Port of Huelva, a few kilometres from the Natural Park, is one of its major environmental threats. Francisco Bella, PSOE senator and former mayor of the town of Almonte, considers it absurd that the pipeline project has been approved while the national government and the regional government of Andalusia invest in renewable energy. As mayor of Almonte, he noted the difficulties of implementing policies that promote employment near the park: (translation) "...we know almost everything about the ant and the lynx, but need to know how employment evolves in Doñana." In line with Bella's position regarding the aqueduct, Ginés Morata, a biologist and former president of the Consejo de Participación de Doñana (Participation Council of Doñana), says that the project, which involves the passage of hundreds of oil tankers per year that would unload their cargoes near Doñana, would lead to an increased possibility of oil spills.

=== Overexploitation of water resources ===
Another environmental problem is water withdrawals for irrigation, many of them illegal, which have doubled since the late 1980s to maintain water-intensive crops such as cotton, rice and more recently strawberries. The latter are grown in greenhouses, with an estimated area under plastic of between 4,500 and 6,000 hectares in the Doñana area, producing over 90% of the Spanish strawberry crop. The boring of illegal wells to draw irrigation water from underground aquifers has apparently proliferated, while the water demands of nearby residential complexes and inappropriate usage of the water resources of nearby rivers may also affect the hydrology of the park. Other potential risks include salin isation resulting from climate change; the intrusion of salt water from the Atlantic would endanger several animal species. On the other hand, desertification could also occur; recently a transfer from the Chanza-Piedras water system was approved by the Diputación de Huelva (Provincial Council of Huelva) to alleviate this eventuality.

=== Impact of agriculture ===
In 2007, the WWF warned that strawberry farms surrounding the park, where 95% of Spanish strawberries were produced, threatened to cause catastrophic damage to the park by depleting the surrounding groundwater, notably where illegal boreholes were involved, as well as creating considerable pesticide pollution and plastic waste which was accumulating in local creeks; AFP further reported that WWF was calling for a boycott of Spanish strawberries, but this is contradicted by the remarks of a WWF Spain spokesperson, and it is uncharacteristic of WWF to call for blanket boycotts.

=== Aznalcóllar disaster ===
On 25 April 1998, a holding dam burst at the Los Frailes mine operated by the mining company, Boliden-Apirsa, near Aznalcóllar, Seville Province, releasing 4–5 million cubic metres of mine tailings. The acidic tailings, which contained dangerous levels of several heavy metals, quickly reached the nearby Agrio river, and then its tributary the Guadiamar, travelling about 40 kilometres along these waterways before they could be stopped and advancing as far as the prepark. The cleanup operation took three years, at an estimated cost of €240 million. Although the spill was slowed by levees and diverted by way of the Guadalquivir to the sea, the vulnerability of Doñana's ecosystems to such environmental catastrophes was evident.

To ensure sustainable development both in the countryside and in the surrounding provinces, as well as to counteract future environmental threats, an International Commission of Experts met in 1992 to propose solutions, and produced the Plan de Desarrollo Sostenible de Doñana y su Entorno (Plan for Sustainable Development of Doñana and its Surroundings), briefly described as:

A plan of action, implemented through the Doñana Operational Programme and funded by the regional government of Andalusia and the Spanish State, as well as the Feder Funds, ESF and EAGGF, to revitalise both the regional infrastructure and social fabric through a new economic model of development compatible with preserving the biodiversity of such an extraordinarily important natural heritage as Doñana.

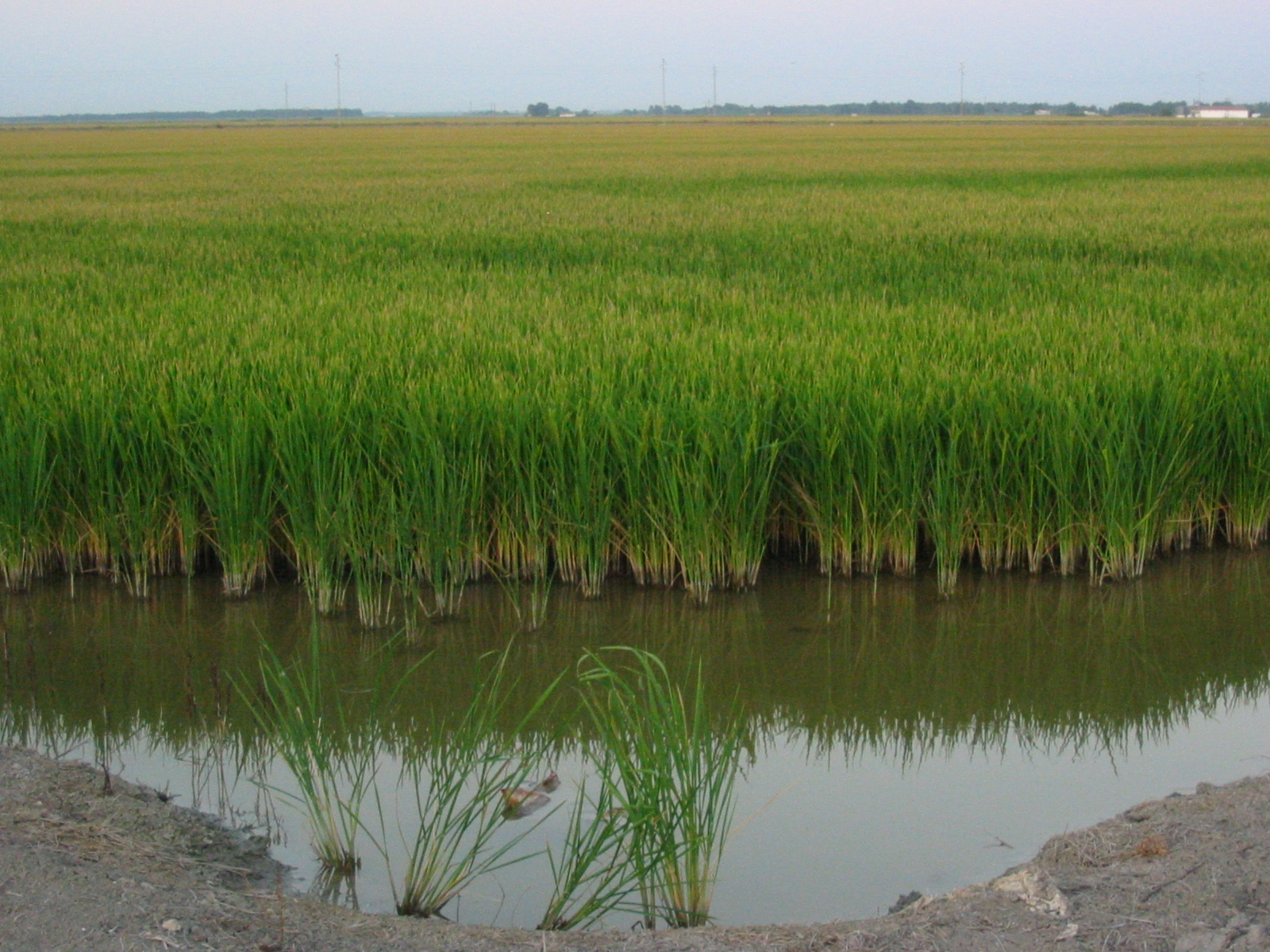
Rice field in Las Marismas, near Isla Mayor

This effectively became the mission statement of the Doñana 21 Foundation, created in 1997 as a partnership between the Governing Council of the Andalusian Regional Government and the El Monte, San Fernando and Unicaja savings banks. The plan established among its objectives the promotion of actions beneficial to the natural environment, seeking the cooperation of national and European governmental bodies, and the various organ isations with an interest in the park, economic or otherwise, for sustainable development of the area (e. g., by encouraging the organic farming of rice). Since then, representatives from Council agencies, businesses, trade unions, and conservation organisations, such as WWF, have joined the foundation and collaborated in meeting its goals.

=== Pipeline ===
In 2013 the construction of a pipeline in the vicinity of the park was authorised by the Spanish Ministry of Agriculture, Food and Environment.

=== Pilgrimage of El Rocío and ecological issues ===
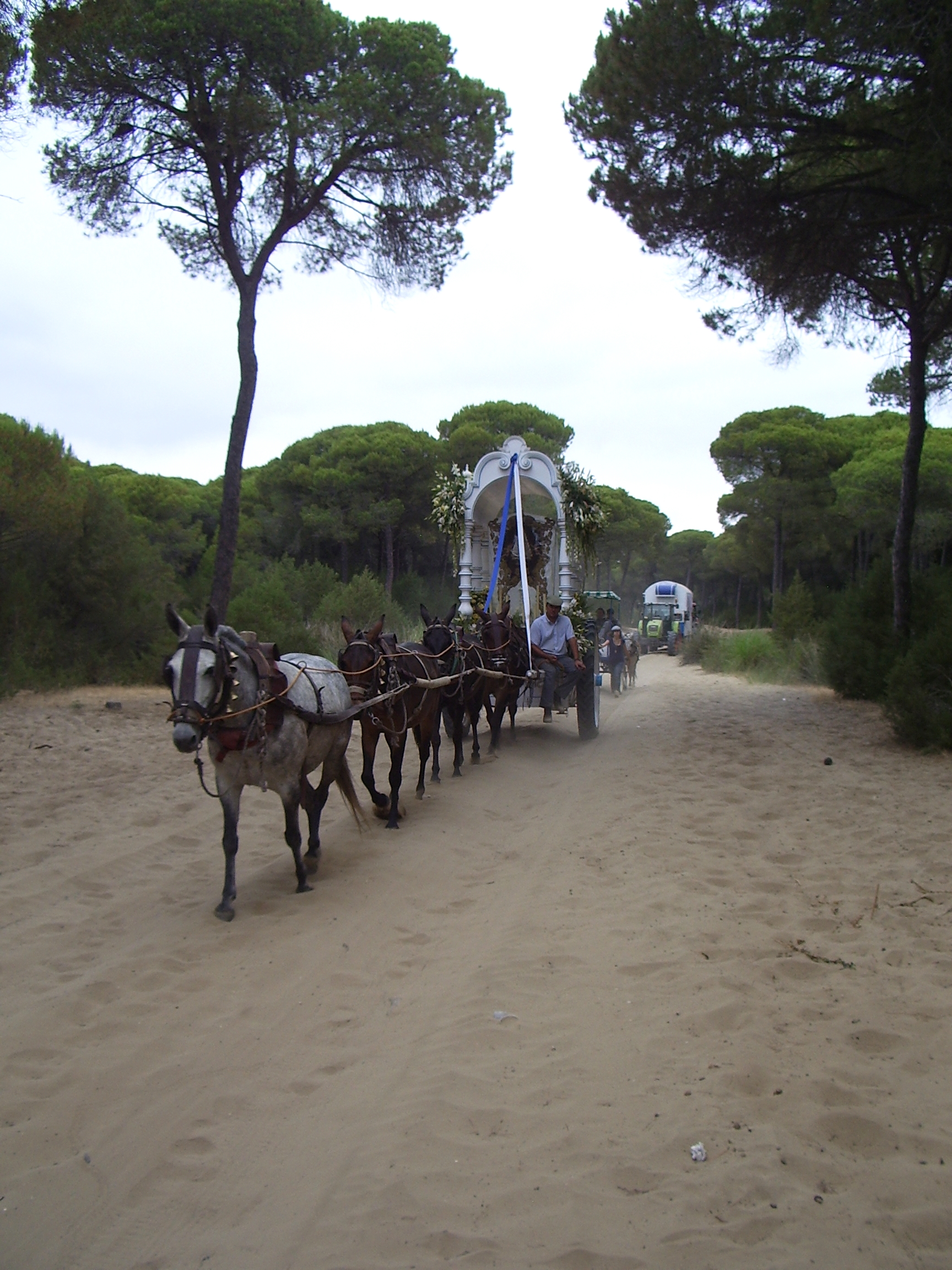
Wagon bearing a Simpecado (banner with insignia that proceeds images of the Holy Virgin Mary) crosses the Coto Doñana on its return from the pilgrimage of El Rocío, in May 2009.

The municipality of Almonte, and therefore the park, is situated in an area in which public manifestations of religious fervour have been frequent throughout the centuries. The deities of nature and water were worshipped by the ancient Iberians, as in the goddess cult of Cybele. The cult rituals, similar in many ways to current Rocieras celebrations, were quickly adapted by the early Christians of these lands to be assimilated in their liturgy. They built a small basilica here, now defunct, but it was mainly after the reconquest of the area in 1262 that the Marian devotions were institutional ised. About 1270–1284, Alfonso X reconstructed the Chapel of St. Mary of Rocinas, and in 1337 Alfonso XI made the first recorded mention of the Marian cult in the area:

...e señaladamente son los mejores sotos de correr cabo de una Iglesia que dicen de Santa María de las Rocinas.(... and in particular it is said that the best groves proceed from the church of St. Mary of Rocinas.) ~Alfonso XI, 1337

The image of the Virgin at the Hermitage of El Rocío dates probably from the 13th century, although the current iconography representing the Virgin as a lady of the royal court was adopted in the late 16th century, according to the fashion of the time. The popularity of the cult of the Virgen del Rocío in modern times has raised concerns about the annual pilgrimage's effect on the natural environment of the park.

The park is used by pilgrims on their way to the Romería de El Rocío. As this event attracts a million pilgrims annually, it has a significant negative impact on the park's eco-system. The overcrowding of pilgrims around certain dates is evident not only in the village of El Rocío where the shrine is located, but also in places within and outside the park such as the Piara del Acebuchal, the Ajolí Bridge, Boca del Lobo and the Moguer road. This has been a publicity windfall for the park, but requires stepped-up park resources for fire prevention and general monitoring, and also has had a significant negative environmental impact (e.g., increased danger of wildfires, off-road SUVs damaging sensitive ground, etc.) denounced by environmentalists.

Wildfires are a recurrent issue for the park (see Doñana fire in 2017).

=== World Heritage in Danger ===
UNESCO reiterated its serious concern over the impact of the irrigation bill on Doñana and gave a fifteen-month ultimatum. The concern over illegal wells was not new: in June 2013, UNESCO's World Heritage Committee warned Spanish authorities that if a solution to problems such as illegal wells was not found, conditions could arise "in the near future" for Doñana to be placed on the List of World Heritage in Danger.

== Doñana Biological Station ==
Doñana Biological Station (EBD, Estación Biológica de Doñana) is a centre dedicated to the study of terrestrial ecology. It was created jointly in 1964 by the Spanish government and the WWF to support scientific research on local ecosystems; in the course of this research the status of other national and international ecosystems is also investigated. The EBD, as an administrative and scientific management agency under the aegis of the CSIC, operates a research centre in Seville, the Doñana Biological Reserve in Almonte, and a Field Station in the Natural Park of Sierras de Cazorla, Segura and Las Villas in the province of Jaén. After the WWF was created in 1961, one of its first actions was to acquire 6,794 hectares of the Doñana estate 'Las Nuevas' in 1963, which it then turned over to the CSIC. The CSIC declared the area to be a Reserva Biológica (Biological Reserve) and in 1964 built the Estación Biológica de Doñana. WWF bought another section of Doñana in 1968 totalling 3,214 hectares and later called the Reserva Biológica de Guadiamar (Guadiamar Biological Reserve).

== Saca de las Yeguas ==
Another important activity of longstanding association with the park is La Saca de las Yeguas ("The Gathering of the Mares"), a livestock event from Almonte pertaining to the indigenous wild horses of the salt marshes of Doñana. On 26 June, after the Feast of St. John the Baptist is celebrated, mares and new foals among the marismeños are gathered in a traditional roundup.

== Other points of interest ==
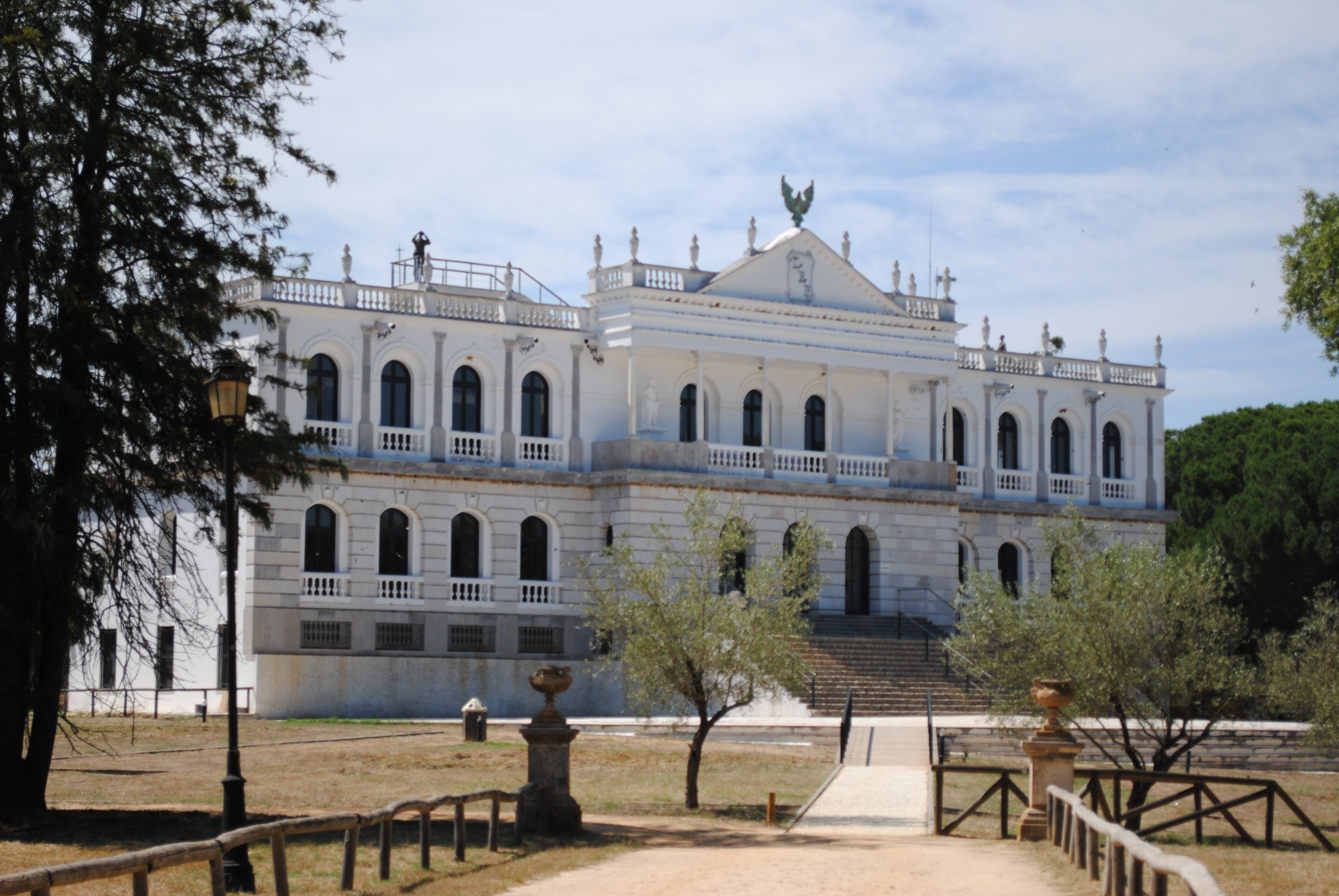
Acebrón Palace (Palacio del Acebrón)

- Acebrón Palace. It was built in the 1960s by Luis Espinosa Fondevilla as a residence and hunting lodge, and currently serves as the park visitors centre.
- Palace of Lomo del Grullo, an old royal house in the north part of the park, also known as Palacio del Rey, Palacio de la Dehesa del Rey or Coto del Rey.
- The Visitors Centre at Acebuche, located in an old farmhouse, is the point of departure for visits to the park. It has trails and bird observatories on the lake of the same name.
- Bajo de Guía Visitors Centre. Located in Sanlúcar de Barrameda, devised for visitors to Doñana Natural Park.
- Ice House Visitors Centre (Centro de Visitantes Fábrica de Hielo). Located in Sanlúcar de Barrameda in the mariners' neighbourhood of Bajo de Guía, this early 20th century former ice house has been repurposed for receiving visitors to Doñana National Park. Beside it is the dock for the Real Fernando, a boat that takes visitors up the Guadalquivir river to La Plancha.
- La Plancha, a reconstructed antique village with marshland cabins on the right bank (west side) of the Guadalquivir, last lived in in the 1980s. From La Plancha, one can access the Llanos de Velázquez (Velázquez Flats) and Llanos de la Plancha (La Plancha Flats), where there are natural observatories.
- Historic Areas of the peoples of the Comarca (Region).
- Matalascañas Dune Park and Marine World Museum, installed on a dune system; opened in 2002, abandoned since 2012 because of debts accumulated by the managing partner Fundacion Donaña 21, an agency of the Junta de Andalucia.

== See also ==
- List of Sites of Community Importance in Andalusia
- Costa de la Luz
- List of Spanish national parks
- Tartessos
