= Marismeño =

Breed of horse

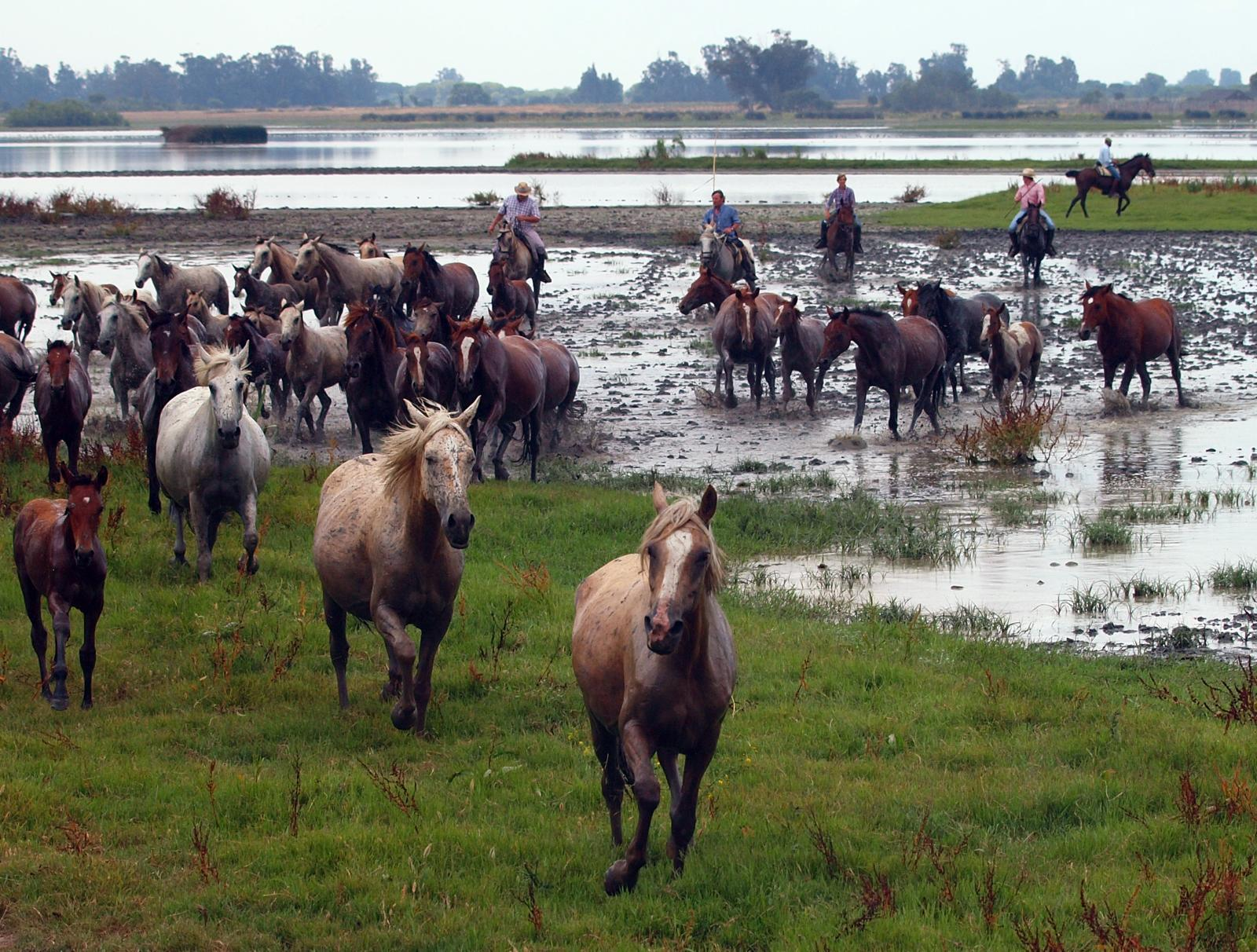
- Conservation status: FAO (2007): not listed; DAD-IS (2024): at risk/endangered
- Other names: Marismeña
- Country of origin: Spain

The Marismeño is a rare Spanish breed of horse indigenous to the marshes of the Guadalquivir River, from which it takes its name. It is now found particularly in the Doñana National Park, which lies mostly in the province of Huelva, in Andalusia in southwestern Spain. Until recently it was not considered a breed; recognition and recovery began in 2003. It is listed in the Catálogo Oficial de Razas de Ganado de España in the group of autochthonous breeds in danger of extinction.
