= WWF Spain =

Spanish non-governmental environmental organization

WWF España Asociación para la Defensa de la Naturaleza

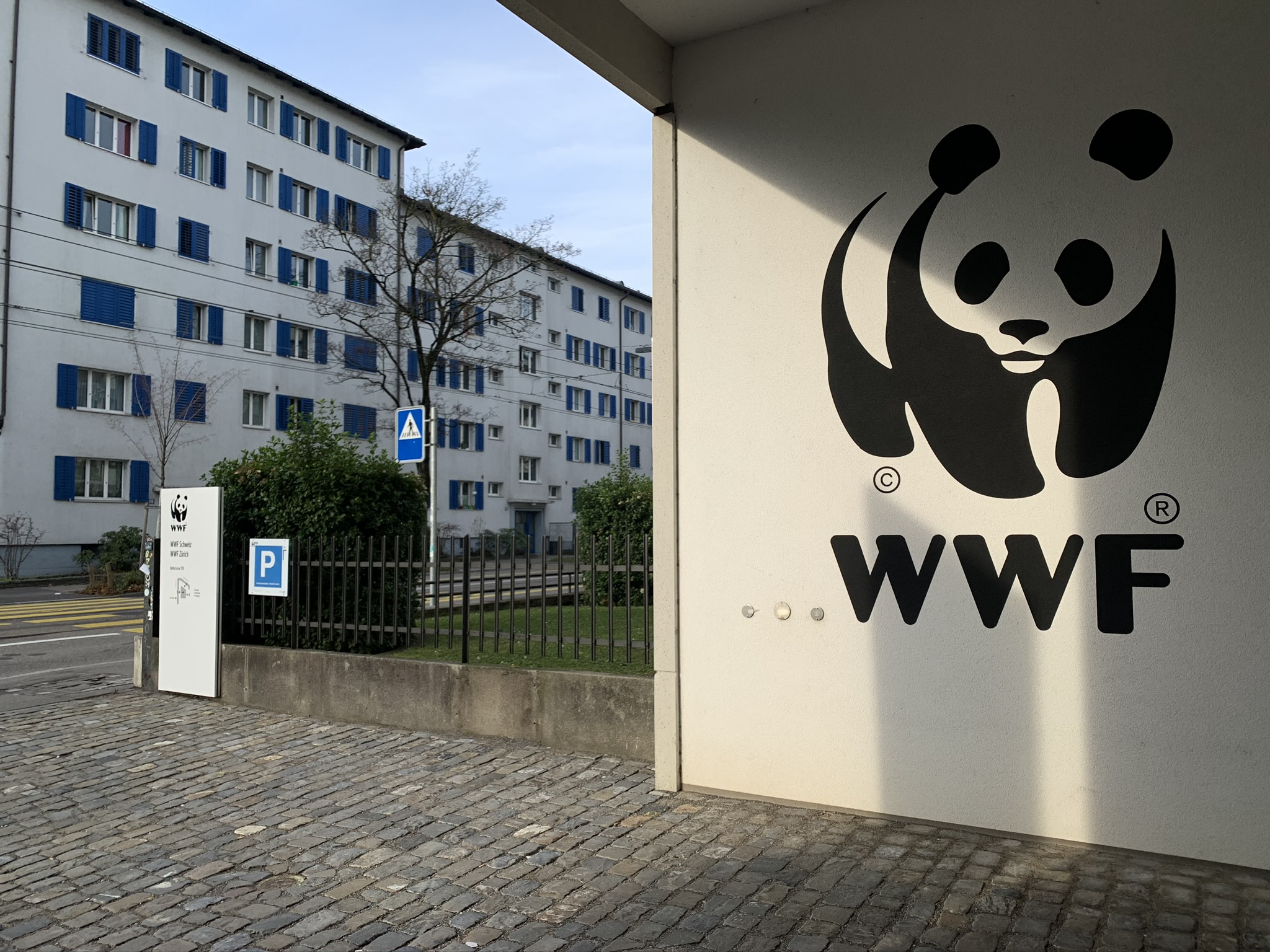
- Formation: 30 July 1968
- Legal status: Volunteer organization
- Purpose: Conservation and protection of nature and the environment
- Headquarters: Gran Vía de San Francisco, 8D, 28005 Madrid
- Members: 50,842 in 2019
- Parent organization: World Wide Fund for Nature
- Website: https://www.wwf.es/

WWF Spain (Spanish: WWF España) is the Spanish section of the World Wide Fund for Nature (WWF), which is one of the world's largest organizations dedicated to the conservation of nature, with headquarters in more than 100 countries. Its mission is to halt the environmental degradation of the planet and build a future in which humans live in harmony with nature, through the protection and conservation of biodiversity and the reduction of the ecological footprint.

== Beginnings ==
The WWF was founded in 1961 with the main goal of raising funds and acting in the defense of endangered natural species around the world. One of the WWF's first and most ambitious goals was to buy land in Doñana to preserve the wild marshes from imminent industrialization.

The Spanish section of WWF was created on 30 July 1968 under the name ADENA, which stands for Asociación para la Defensa de la Naturaleza. (Note: English: Association for the Defense of Nature—not to be confused with Association for the Defense of Nature (ADN), which is a regional NGO working to protect and study nature in Andorra.) Naturalist Félix Rodríguez de la Fuente was one of its founders and served as its vice president until his death in 1980.

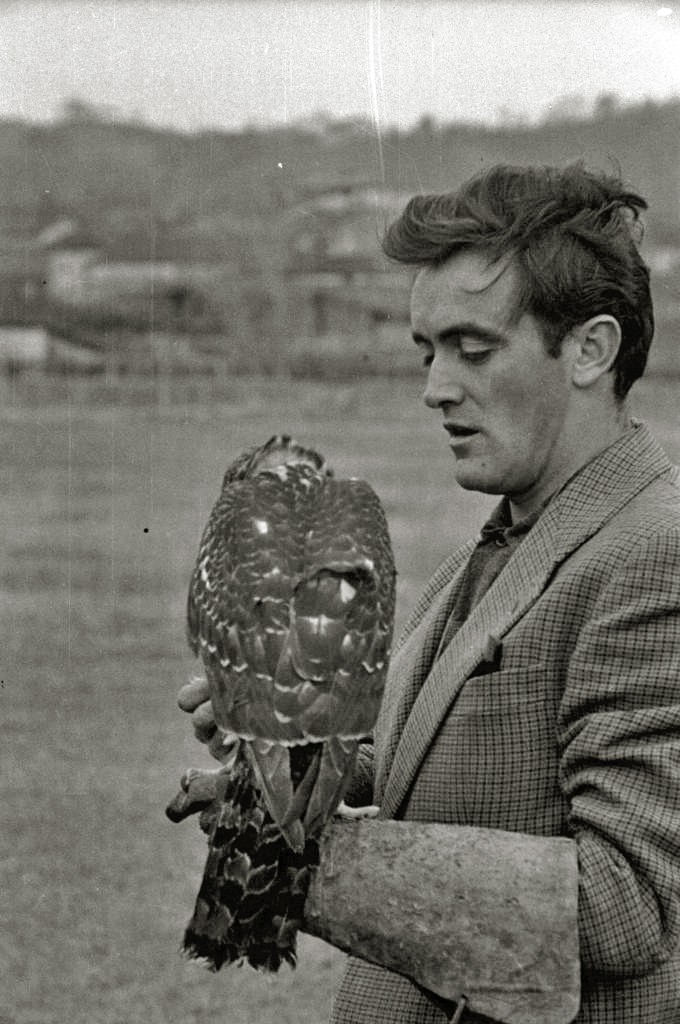
Félix Rodríguez de la Fuente photographed at an exhibition in Lasarte, 1955

Rodríguez de la Fuente fought for the creation of natural and national parks, the protection of endangered species—such as wolves, the Eurasian griffon vulture, and the peregrine falcon. Thanks to him, it was possible to save the Tablas de Daimiel wetlands from drying out, to prevent the construction of an urban development in the Albufera de València, and to enforce the legal protection of the Doñana and Cabrera parks. Therefore, the creation of ADENA is closely linked to the creation of the Doñana National Park, one of the most biodiverse places in Europe. The organization later joined the WWF network and became known as WWF/Adena. Since 2009, it has been known as WWF Spain.

ADENA's way of working focuses on conservation projects on the ground and with local communities, seeking solutions to environmental problems, in contrast to the other major environmental organizations working in Spain, such as Greenpeace and Ecologists in Action, which work more on denunciation at a global and local scale, respectively. WWF's global logo, the giant panda, has become an icon that the public identifies with nature conservation.

== The 1970s ==
ADENA launched the first campaign for the conservation of amphibians in Spain and took part in campaigns against poisoning, for the protection of the wetlands of La Mancha, against illegal hunting, and other causes. In 1973, it participated in the First Working Meeting of Wolf Specialists and of the First International Conference on Conservation of the Wolf held in Stockholm, Sweden. In subsequent years, it created the Birds of Prey Refuge of Montejo de la Vega. Moreover, in order to preserve the Mediterranean fauna, it launched a campaign in defense of the mountain ranges and forests of Extremadura and proposed the creation of the Tablas de Daimiel National Park.

== The 1980s ==
In 1983, Adena launched the first issue of its magazine Panda, and began taking part in projects to study the Iberian lynx and the white stork, studying the ecology of many other animal species, and actively fighting for their conservation. Furthermore, it created a database of plants endemic to the Spanish Mediterranean and launched the awareness campaign Salvemos las plantas que nos salvan a nosotros, (Note: English: Let’s save the plants that save us) an unprecedented initiative for the conservation of forests. It also created the La Encantá Botanical Micro-reserve in Villarrobledo, Albacete; launched environmental education activities; dealt a hard blow to the poaching of bears in Asturias; continued to work for the protection of the Doñana National Park; and decried the construction of the Costa Doñana residential development.

== The 1990s ==
WWF helped complete the list of natural areas to be included in the Natura 2000 network.

== The 21st century ==
=== Honorary presidency ===
In 2012, a controversy arose surrounding an elephant hunting safari in Botswana involving then King Juan Carlos I of Spain, who had been the honorary president of WWF Spain since its founding in 1968. The king had been going on these safaris since 2006, but the news came to light when the government announced harsh economic cuts for the Spanish people. On 21 July 2012, via a special assembly, the organization decided by 226 to 13 votes to remove the position of honorary president from its statutes.

== See also ==
- World Wide Fund for Nature
- Félix Rodríguez de la Fuente
- Doñana National Park

== Bibliography ==
- Gómez-Campo, César; Herranz-Sanz, José M. (1993). "Conservation of Iberian endemic plants: The botanical reserve of La Encantada (Villarrobledo, Albacete, Spain)". Biological Conservation . 64 (2). Elsevier: 155–160. doi:10.1016/0006-3207(93)90652-H.
- Jiménez-Sánchez, Manuel (September 2007). "The Environmental Movement in Spain: A Growing Force of Contention". South European Society and Politics. 12 (3). Taylor & Francis: 359–378. doi:10.1080/13608740701495244.
- Valladares, Miguel A., ed. (2018). "50 años en defensa de la naturaleza" (PDF). Panda - Revista trimestral de WWF España (in Spanish) (141). WWF España: 24.
