= Francisco Bernis =

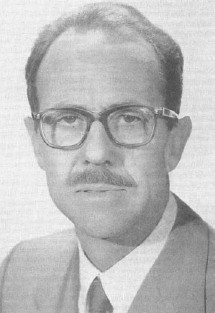

Francisco Bernis Madrazo (16 August 1916 – 10 November 2003) was a Spanish ornithologist who has been called the father of modern ornithology in Spain. He was a professor at the University of Madrid, a founding member of the Spanish Ornithological Society and the founding editor of the journal Ardeola.

== Life and work ==
Bernis was born in Salamanca where his father, Francisco, from Seville was a professor of economics at the University of Salamanca. His mother Rosa was from Salamanca. The family estate, La Vádima, on the Tormes River, was surrounded by wilderness and he became interested in nature at an early age. His father enrolled him into the Royal Spanish Society of Natural History in the bulletin of which he wrote his first work on birds at the age of 17. He studied at the German School in Madrid (1923–27), Instituto Escuela (1927–33) and studied law at the Central University of Madrid from 1934. His studies were interrupted by the Spanish Civil War (1936–1939) but he finished school, shifting to natural sciences, in 1941. He became a teacher at the National Boys' Secondary School in Lugo in 1943 and completed a doctorate in botany in 1950 with research on the genus Armeria (Plumbaginaceae). In 1954 he was a founding member of the Spanish Ornithological Society. The society published the journal Ardeola from 1954 and he edited it until 1970. In the early years of the journal much of the research was by foreign visiting ornithologists, with many articles translated into Spanish by Bernis. Bernis also wrote extensively on bird conservation. In 1956 he became a professor of vertebrate zoology at Madrid University where he trained a generation of students. He established bird ringing programs, nest recording schemes, census, atlases and raptor migration counts. He contributed to the declaration of wetland conservation sites including the Coto Doñana. His studies were sponsored by the industrialist Juan López Suárez (1884–1970). In 1972 he represented Spain at the Ramsar Conference. He wrote about wetland birds in Información Española sobre Anátidas y Fochas (1964) and produced a textbook on bird migration in Spanish, Migración en Aves, Tratado Teórico y Práctico (1966). Bernis guided 23 doctoral students.

Bernis married Cristina Carro, a professor of Spanish literature, in 1945 and they had three children. She died a year before him. Bernis was an honorary member of the British Ornithologists' Union, the American Ornithological Union (1982), the French Society for Ornithology and the Deutsche Ornithologische Gesellschaft.
