= Guadalquivir Marshes =

Guadalquivir Marshes Marismas del Guadalquivir
- Natural region
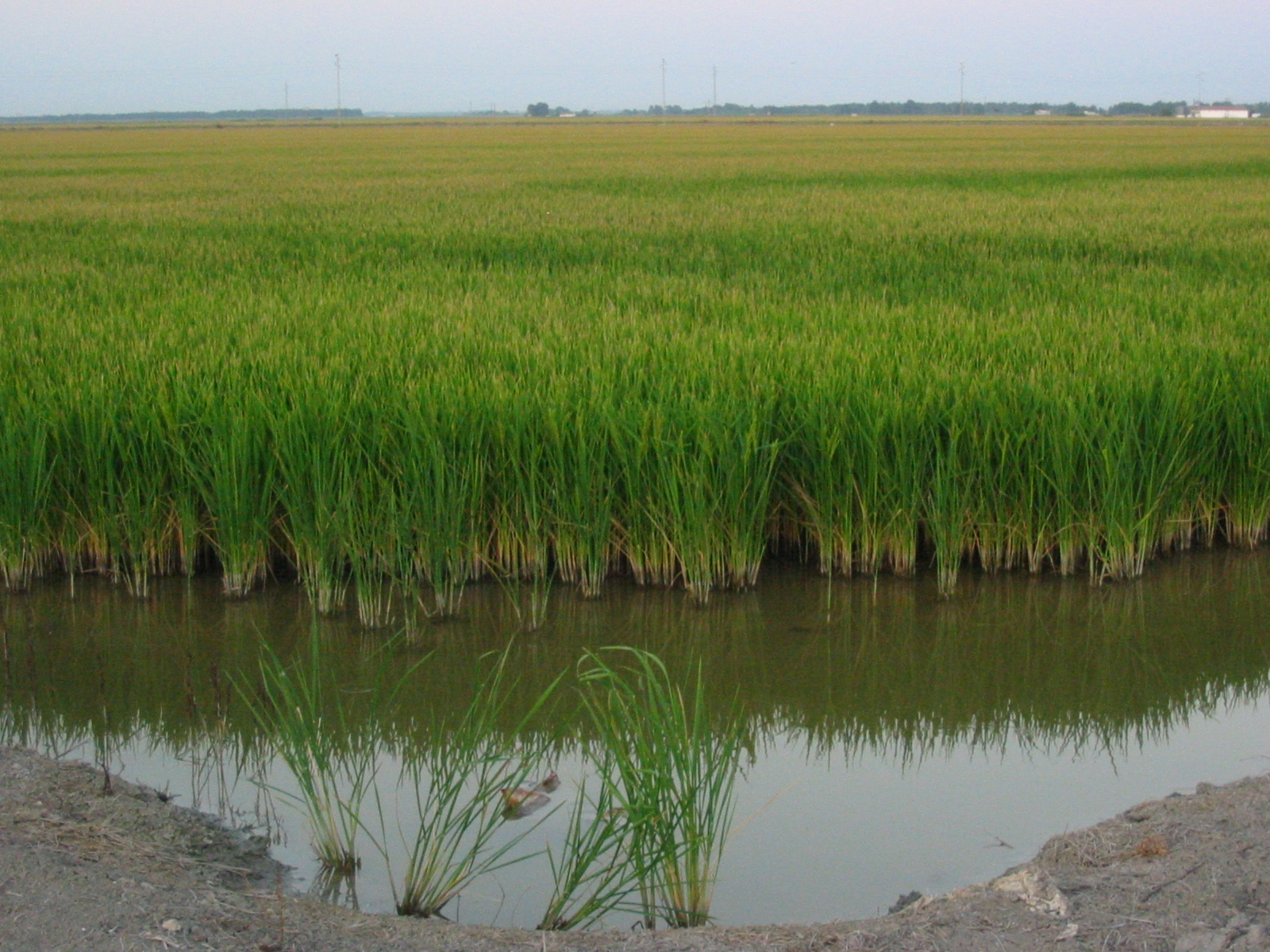
- Las Marismas del Guadalquivir landscape, depicting rice fields in the Isla Mayor area.

- Location within Spain
- Coordinates: 36°57′N 6°19′W
- Country: Spain
- Region: Andalucia

Area
  - Total: 2,000 km^{2} (770 sq mi)

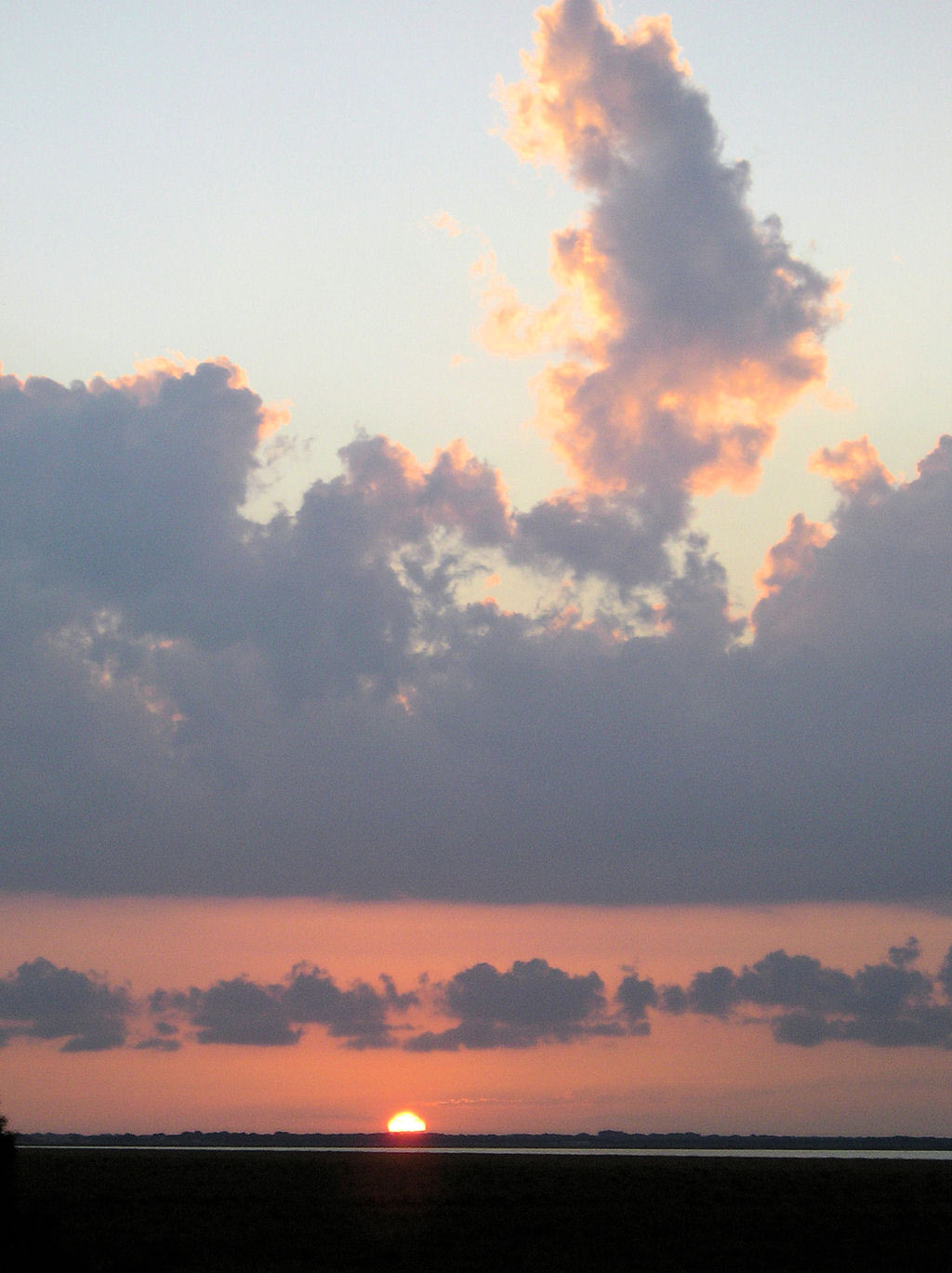
Sunset at Las Marismas

The Guadalquivir Marshes (in Spanish: Marismas del Guadalquivir or simply Las Marismas) are a natural region of marshy lowlands on the lower Guadalquivir River.

The Las Marismas zone forms a large part of the province of Huelva, province of Seville and province of Cádiz in Andalucia, Spain. The area includes parts of the municipalities of Isla Mayor, Los Palacios y Villafranca, La Puebla del Río, Utrera, Las Cabezas de San Juan and Lebrija and Sanlúcar de Barrameda.

Rice farming in this area produces 40% of Spain's national crop. Some areas are protected for wildlife and habitat, including dunes.

== History ==
Approximately two millennia ago the wetlands comprised a large lagoon and estuary, known as Lacus Ligustinus in Latin, leading to the Guadalquivir River mouth with some sand bars to the South. Over time the lake silted up, gradually transforming into marshland. This silt has formed into a barrier of dunes extending approximately 70 kilometres (43 mi) along the coast, known as Arenas Gordas (English: "the fat sands").

The marquessate de las Marismas del Guadalquivir is a Spanish noble title named after the area; this noble title was created by Royal Decree of King Ferdinand VII in 1829 for Alejandro María Aguado y Ramírez de Estenoz.

In the early 21st century, the Guadalquivir wetland region's main economic activity is agriculture, specialising in the cultivation of rice. An area of about 400 km^{2} is devoted to rice farming. It has an annual output of about 310,000 metric tonnes, equating to approximately 40% of Spain's rice production.

== Protected area ==
The wetland zone acts as a buffer zone between the human settlements of the Guadalquivir region and Doñana National Park, a protected area of marshland, streams, and sand dunes. The National Park was established in 1969 as a nature reserve when the World Wildlife Fund joined forces with the Spanish Government to purchase a substantial part of the local wetlands in order to preserve them.

== Fauna ==
The Las Marismas area is home to a large number of wildlife species. Commonly seen terrestrial animals include deer, lynx, and wild boars. Notable avian species include vultures, flamingos, herons, spoonbills, and ducks. The rare Spanish imperial eagle lives here, whose population is considered vulnerable by the International Union for Conservation of Nature.

== See also ==
- Gulf of Cádiz
- Sanlúcar de Barrameda
