= Isla Mayor =

- Municipality
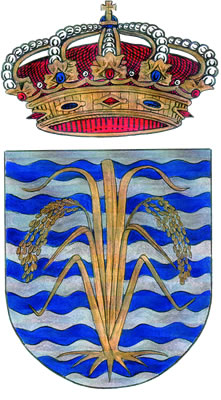
- Flag Coat of arms

- Location in Spain
- Coordinates: 37°8′N 6°10′W
- Country: Spain
- Province: Seville
- Municipality: Isla Mayor

Area
  - Total: 114 km^{2} (44 sq mi)
- Elevation: 5 m (16 ft)

Population (2025-01-01)
  - Total: 5,748
  - Density: 50.4/km^{2} (131/sq mi)
- Time zone: UTC+1 (CET)
  - Summer (DST): UTC+2 (CEST)

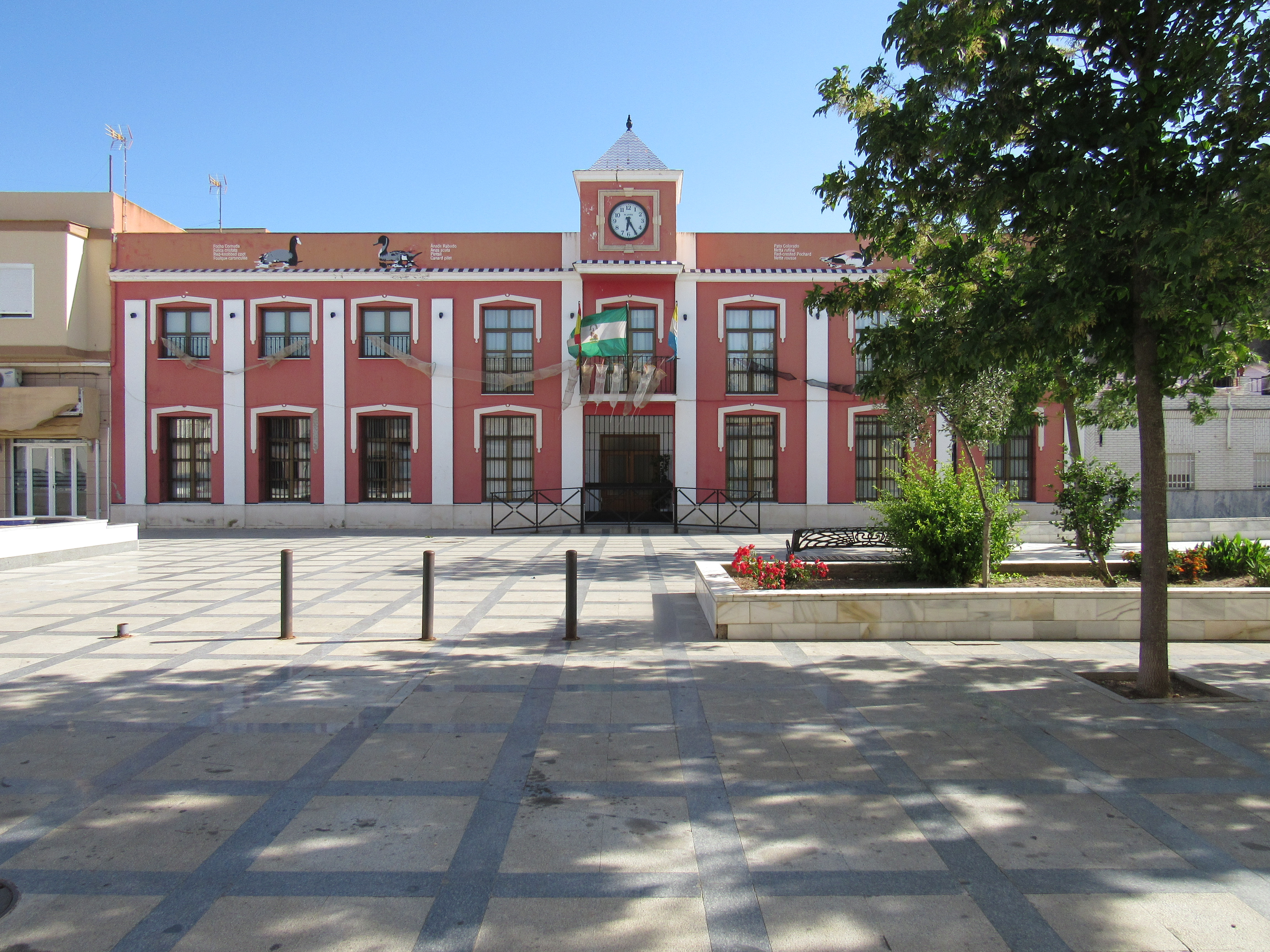
Isla Mayor City Hall. (May 2016)

Isla Mayor is a municipality located in the province of Seville, Spain. According to the 2009 census, the municipality has a population of 5873 inhabitants.

== Geography ==
The main village is Isla Mayor, about 45 km south west of Sevilla, The small village of Poblado de Alfonso XIII is in the same municipality. Isla Mayor separated from the municipality of Puebla del Río in 1994.

Isla Mayor is situated in the Las Marismas (marshes) of the Bajo Guadalquivir River, of which one part forms part of the Doñana National Park. The land is formed from sediment at the mouth of the Guadalquivir river. It is crisscrossed by canals, with the land dedicated primarily to the cultivation of rice.

Previously just a seasonal settlement for workers in the rice harvest, it became a permanent settlement in 1956 with the establishment of a paper factory by the Instituto Nacional de Colonización. The village and municipality were known as Villafranco del Guadalquivir, in honour of dictator Francisco Franco. In 2000, the town was renamed "Isla Mayor" by popular vote.

== See also ==
- Guadalquivir Marshes
- List of municipalities in Seville
