= Aerial tramway =

Aerial cable shuttle transport

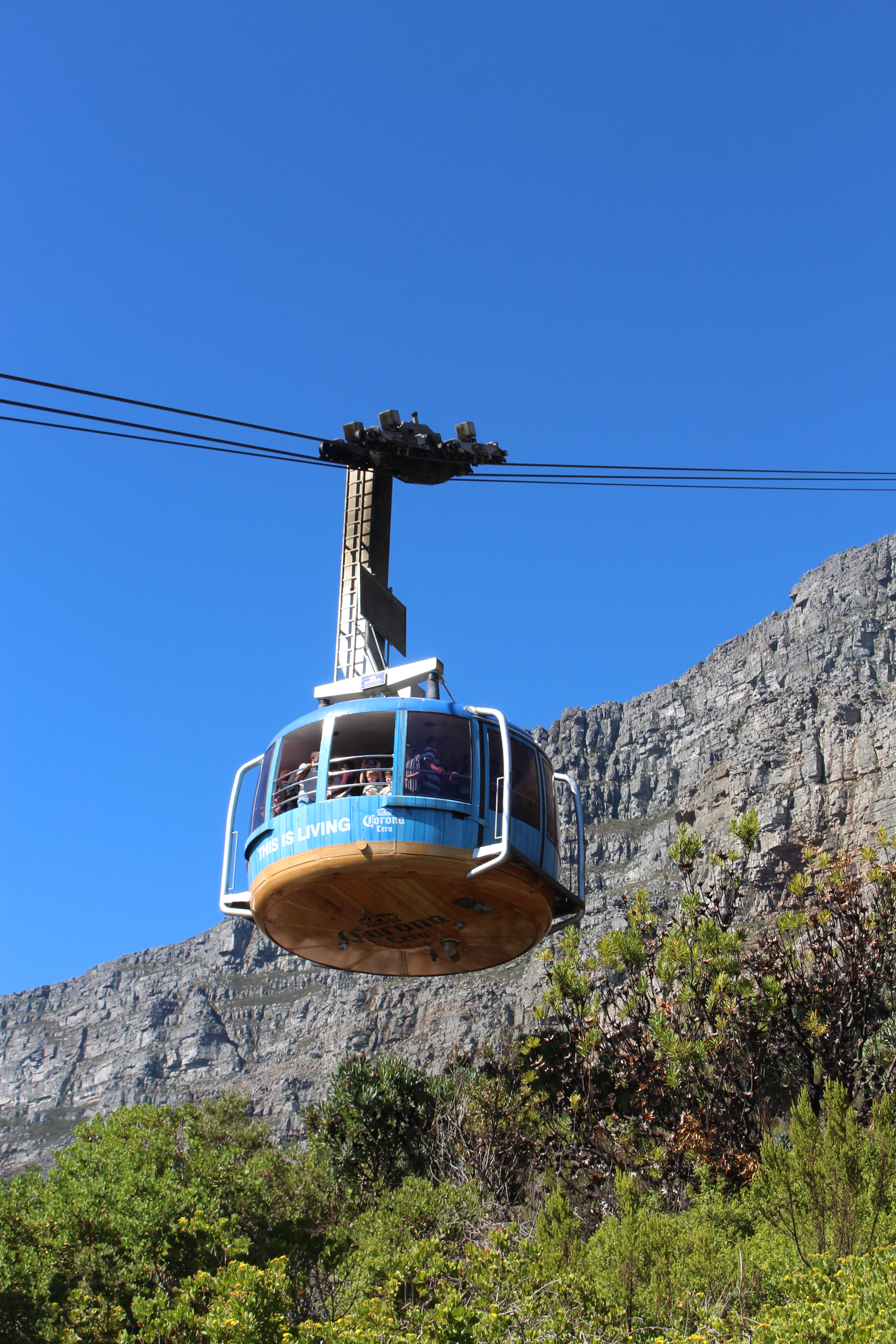
The Table Mountain Aerial Cableway in Cape Town, South Africa

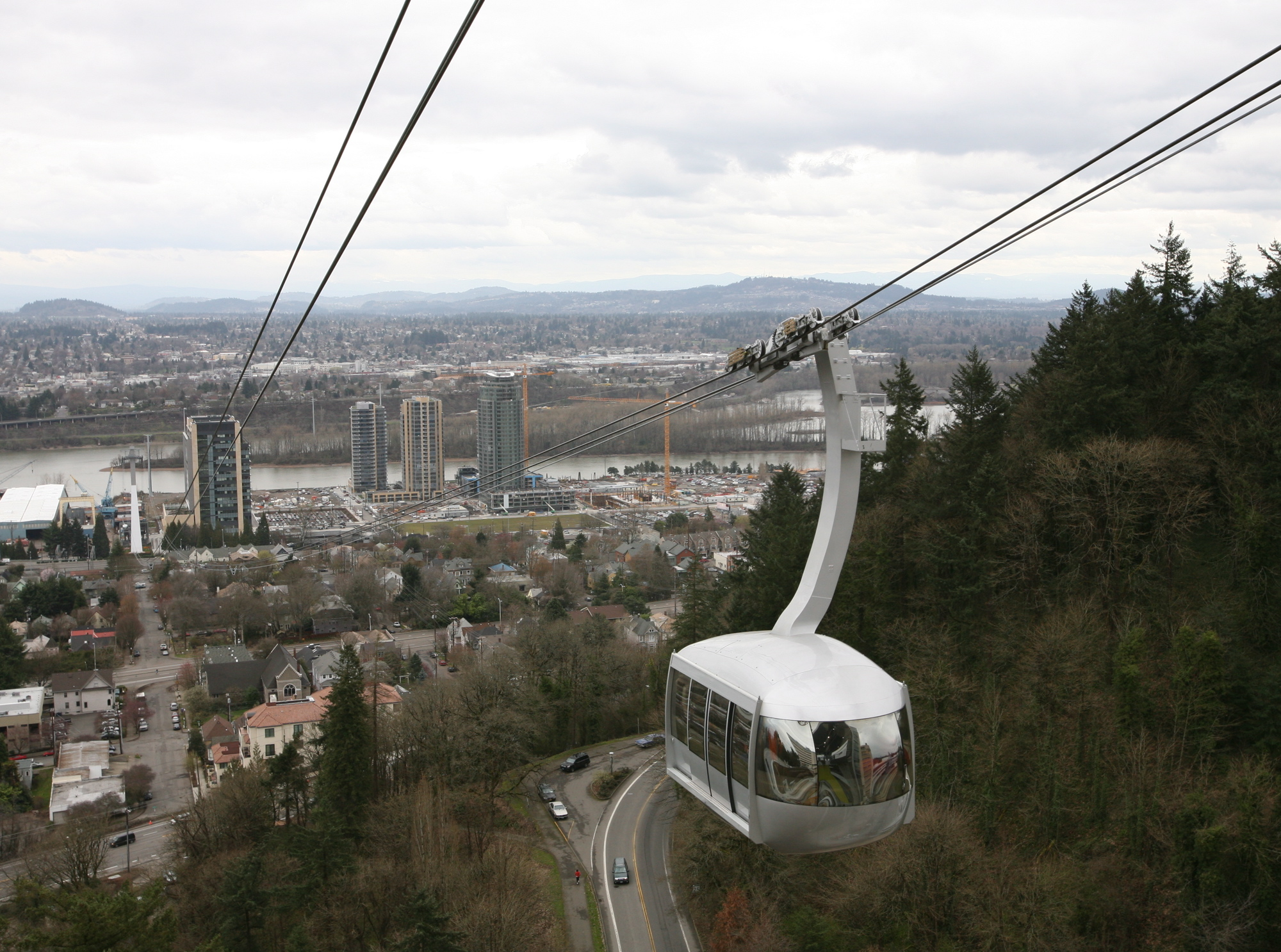
The Portland Aerial Tram in Portland, Oregon, US

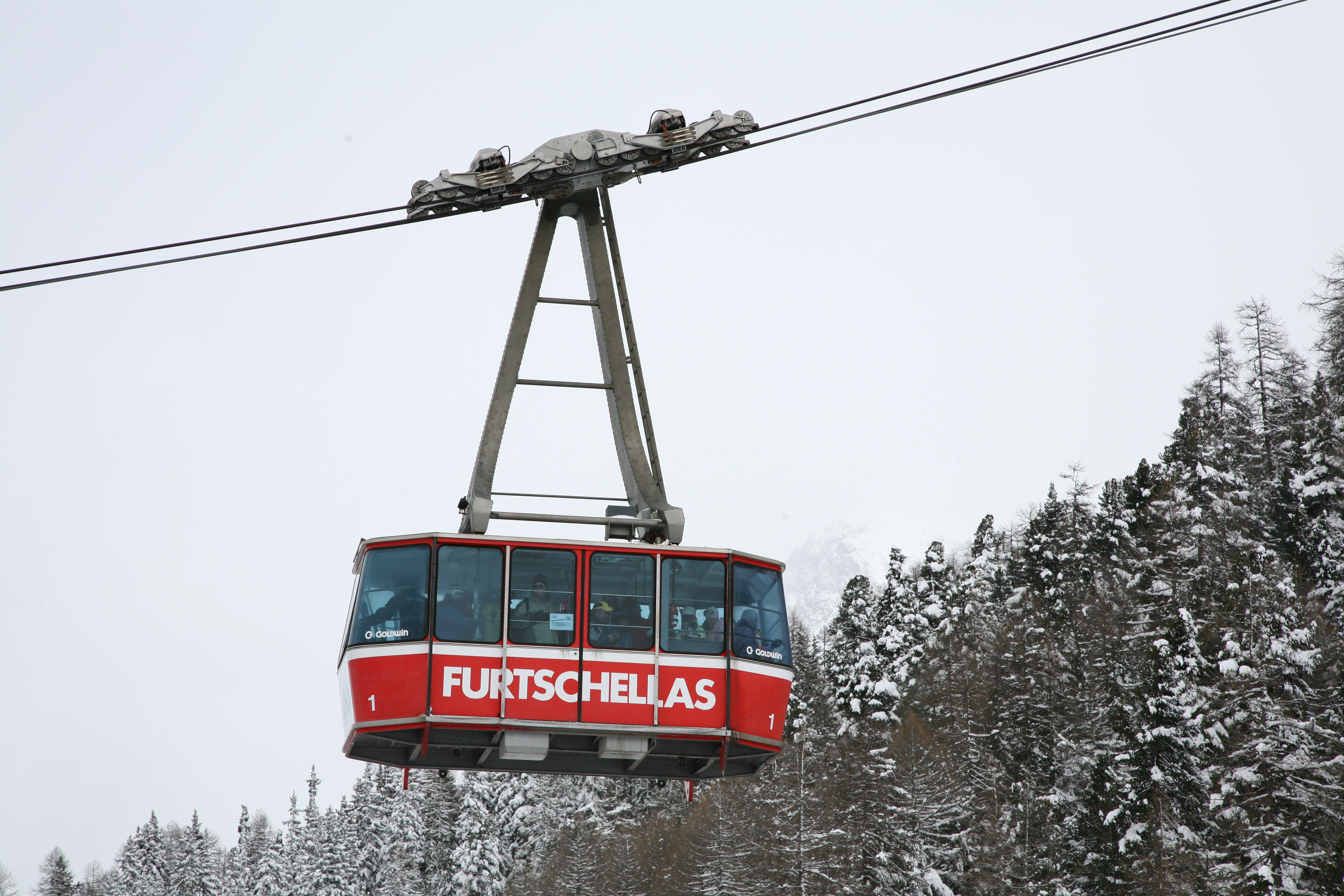
Aerial tramway in Engadin, Switzerland, suspended on two track cables with an additional haulage rope

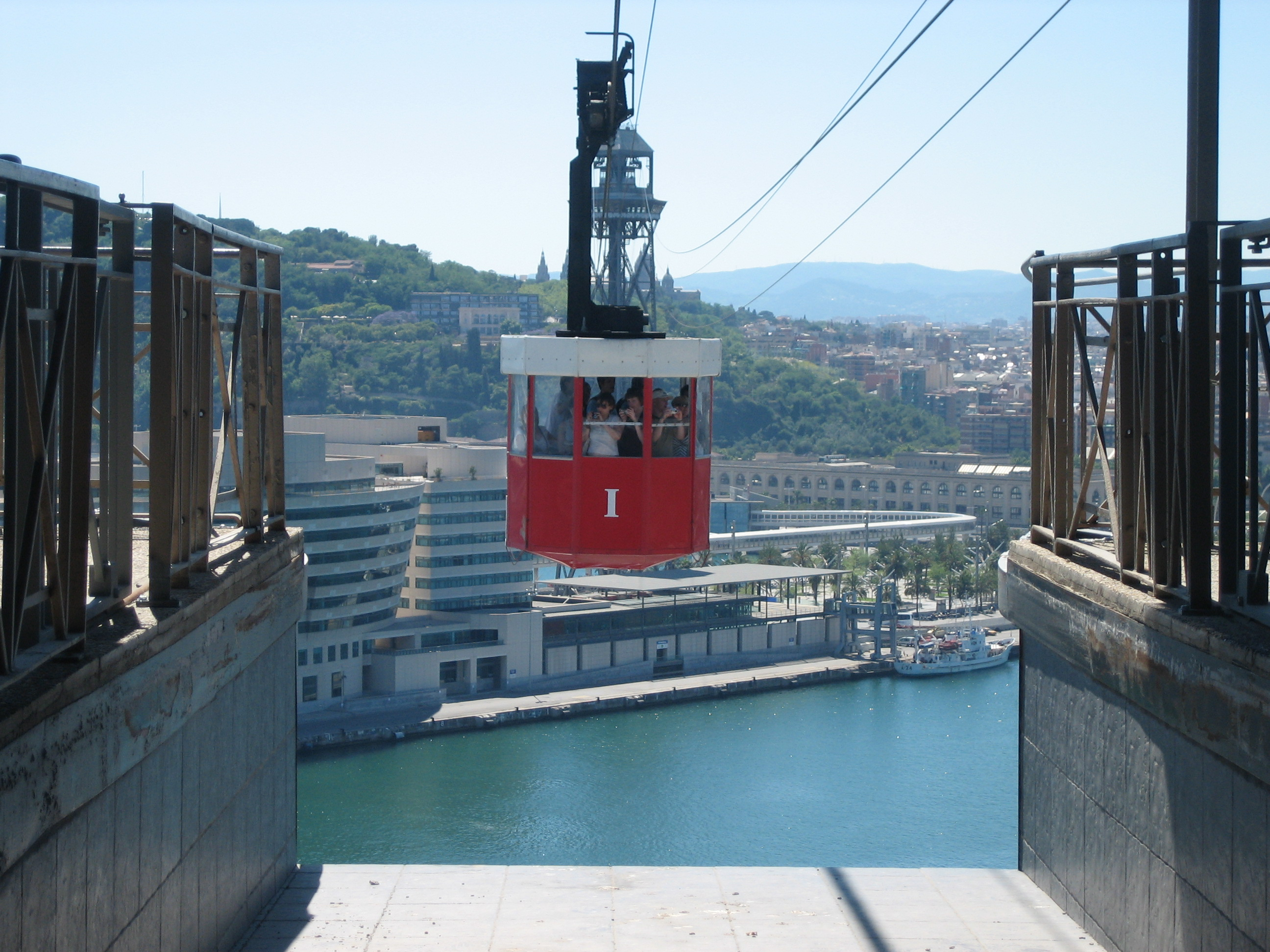
The Port Vell Aerial Tramway in Barcelona, Spain

An aerial tramway, aerial tram, sky tram, cable car or aerial cablecar, aerial cableway or ropeway is a type of aerial lift that uses one or two stationary cables for support, with a third moving cable providing propulsion. With this form of lift, the grip of an aerial tramway cabin is fixed onto the propulsion cable and cannot be decoupled from it during operation. Aerial tramways usually provide lower line capacities and longer wait times than gondola lifts.

== Terminology ==
Cable car is the usual term in British English, where tramway generally refers to a railed street tramway. In American English, cable car may additionally refer to a cable-pulled street tramway with detachable vehicles (e.g., San Francisco's cable cars). Consequently careful phrasing is necessary to prevent confusion.

It is also sometimes called a ropeway or even incorrectly referred to as a gondola lift. A gondola lift has cabins suspended from a continuously circulating cable whereas aerial trams simply shuttle back and forth on cables. In Japan, the two are considered as the same category of vehicle and called ropeway, while the term cable car refers to both ground-level cable cars and funiculars. An aerial railway where the vehicles are suspended from a fixed track as opposed to a cable is known as a suspension railway.

== Overview ==
An aerial tramway consists of one or two fixed cables (called track cables), one loop of cable (called a haulage rope), and one or two passenger or cargo cabins. The fixed cables provide support for the cabins while the haulage rope, by means of a grip, is solidly connected to the truck (the wheel set that rolls on the track cables). An electric motor drives the haulage rope which provides propulsion. Aerial tramways are constructed as reversible systems; vehicles shuttling back and forth between two end terminals and propelled by a cable loop which stops and reverses direction when the cabins arrive at the end stations. Aerial tramways differ from gondola lifts in that gondola lifts are considered continuous systems (cabins attached onto a circulating haul cable that moves continuously).

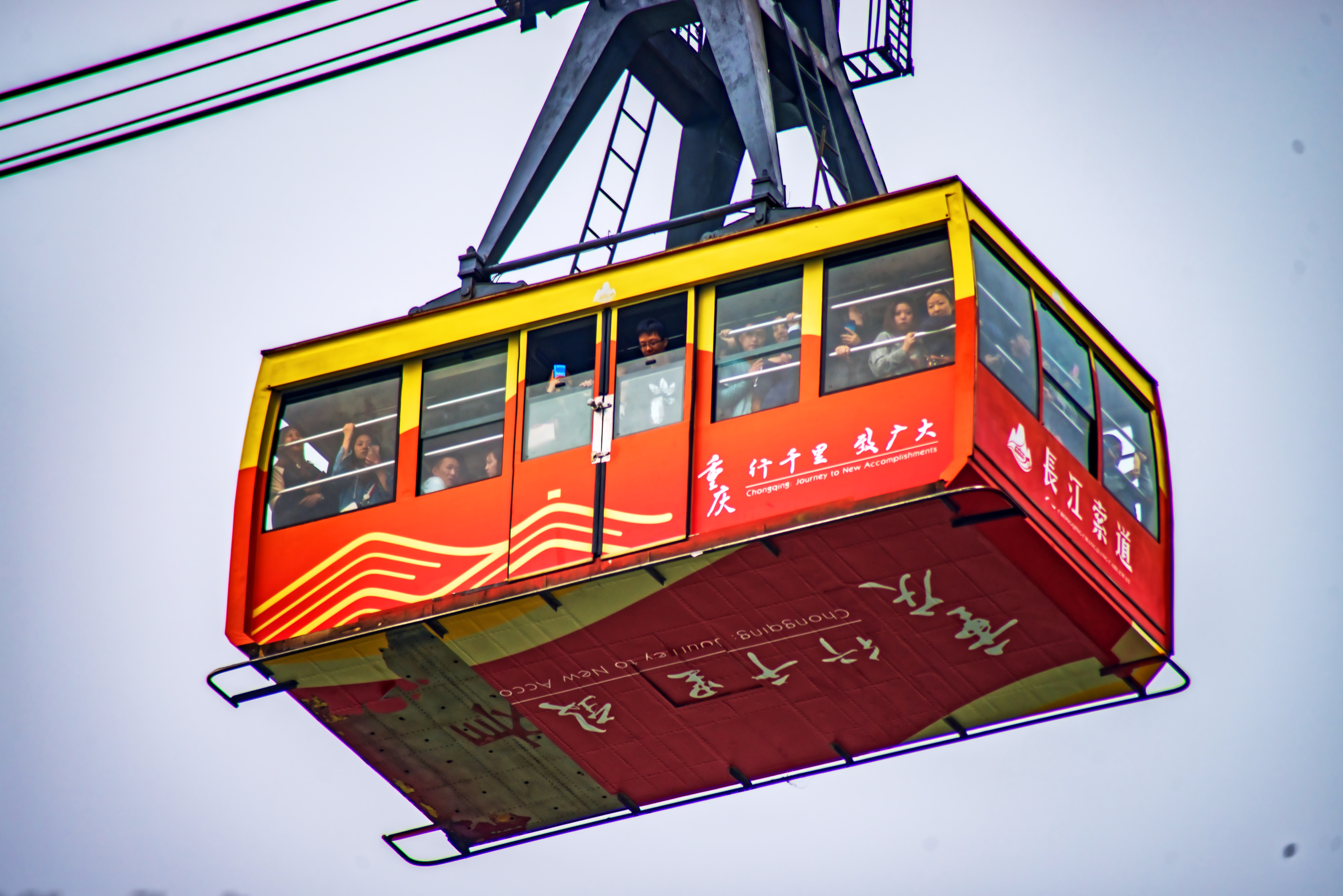
The Yangtze River Cableway across the Yangtze river in the Chongqing CBD

Two-car tramways use a jig-back system: a large electric motor is located at the bottom of the tramway so that it effectively pulls one cabin down, using that cabin's weight to help pull the other cabin up. A similar system of cables is used in a funicular railway. The two passenger or cargo cabins, which carry from 4 to over 150 people, are situated at opposite ends of the loops of cable. Thus, while one is coming up, the other is going down the mountain, and they pass each other midway on the cable span.

Some aerial trams have only one cabin, which lends itself better to systems with small elevation changes along the cable run.

== History ==
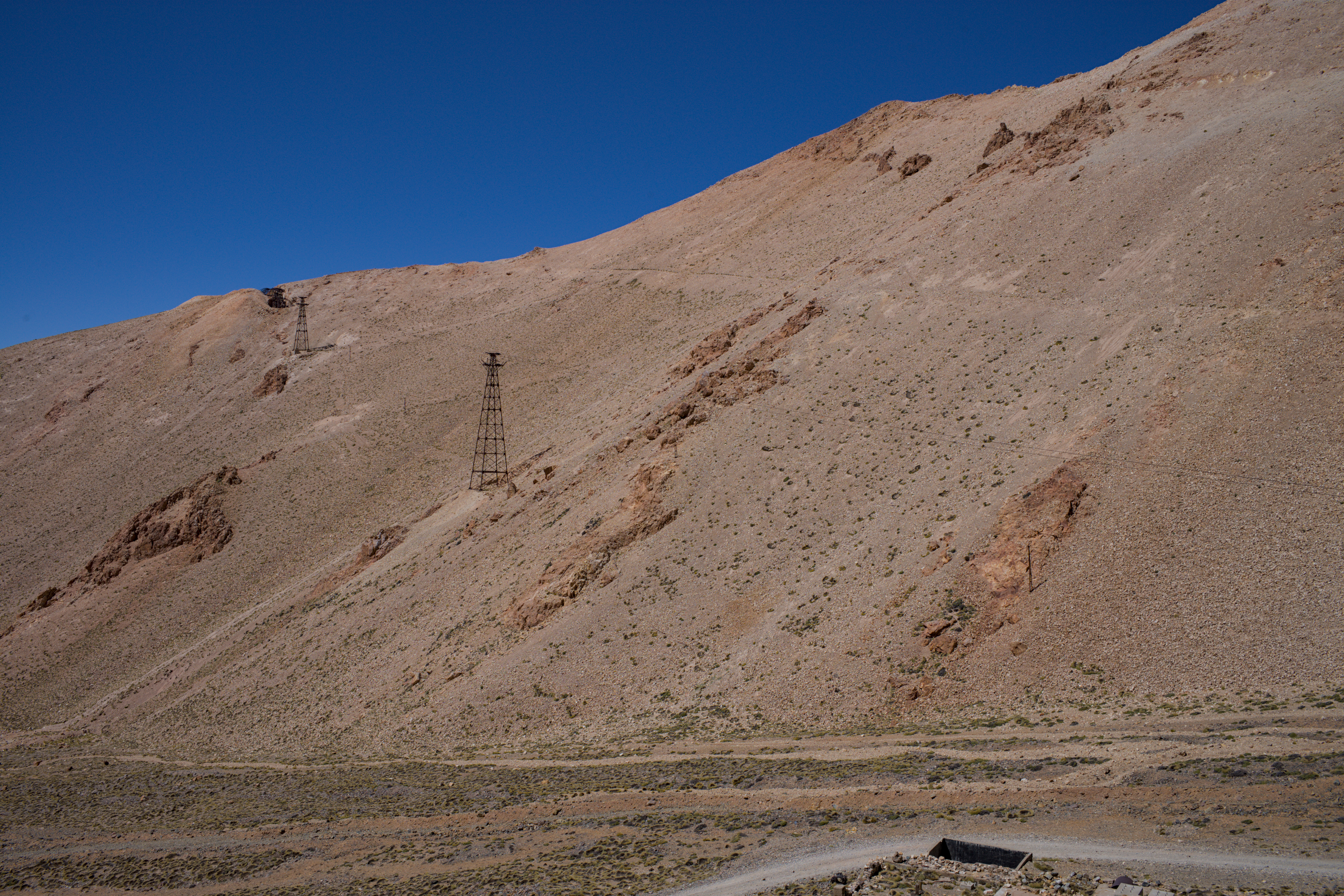
The pylons between the last stations of the La Mejicana aerial tramway in Chilecito, Argentina.

The first design of an aerial lift was by Croatian polymath Fausto Veranzio, and the first operational aerial tram was built in 1644 by Adam Wybe in Gdańsk, Poland. It was moved by horses and used to move soil over the river to build defences. It is called the first known cable lift in European history and precedes the invention of steel cables. It is not known how long this lift was used. Germany installed the second cable lift 230 years later, now using iron wire cable.

=== In mining ===
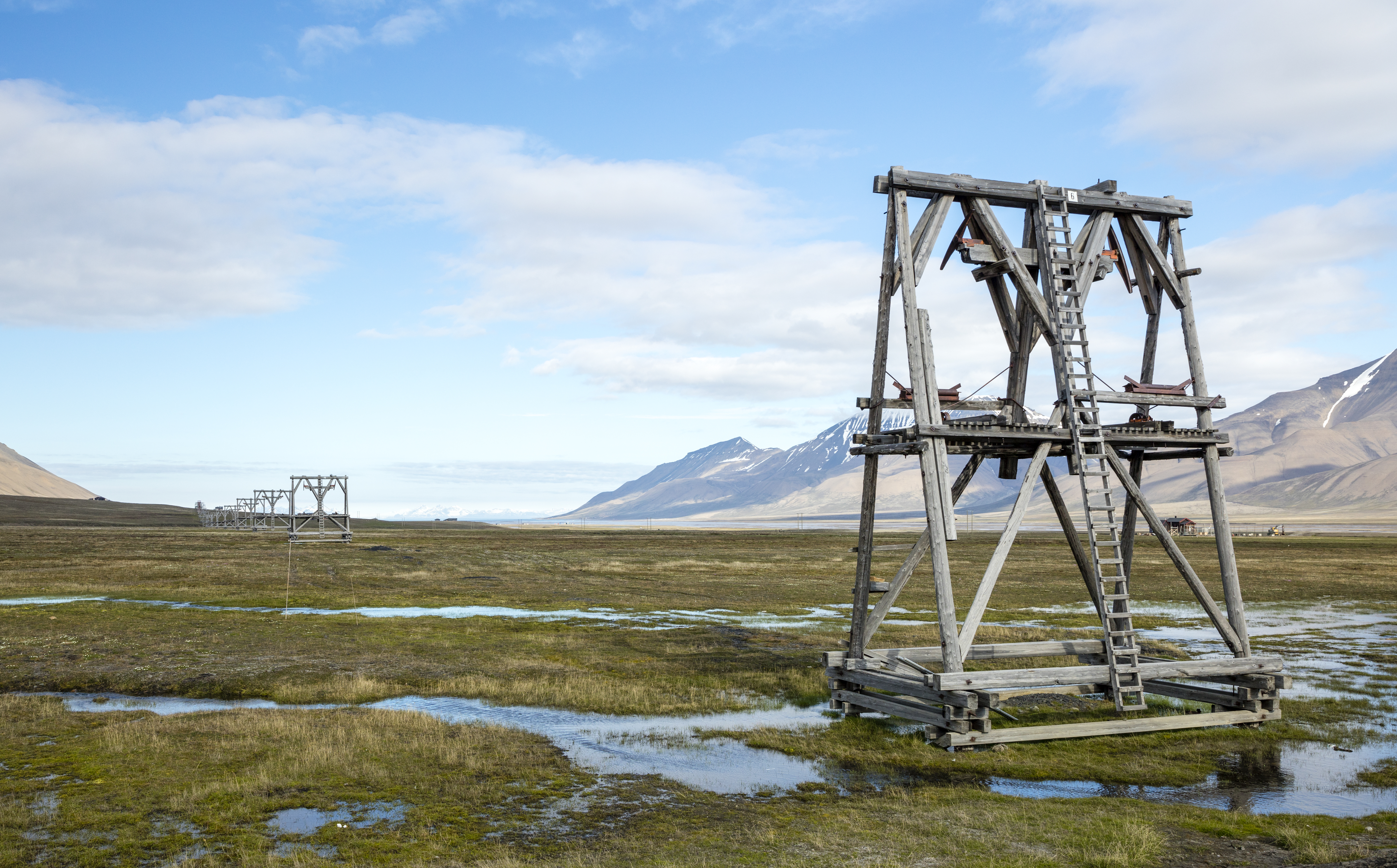
Cableway from abandoned coal mine in Adventdalen to Longyearbyen, Svalbard (Norway)

Aerial tramways are sometimes used in mountainous regions to carry ore from a mine located high on the mountain to an ore mill located at a lower elevation. Ore tramways were common in the early 20th century at the mines in North and South America. One can still be seen in the San Juan Mountains of the US state of Colorado. Another famous use of aerial tramways was at the Kennecott Copper mine in Wrangell-St. Elias National Park, Alaska. One of the longest and highest aerial tramway used for mining was built for the La Mejicana mine in Chilecito in Argentina, operating between 1906-1927, it carried material between the mine over a height difference of 3,374 m (11,070 ft). While out of service, the stations of the aerial tramway remain a frequent tourist destination.

Other firms entered the mining tramway business, including Otto, Leschen, Breco Ropeways Ltd., Ceretti and Tanfani, and Riblet. A major British contributor was Bullivant, which became a constituent of British Ropes in 1924.

=== Moving people ===
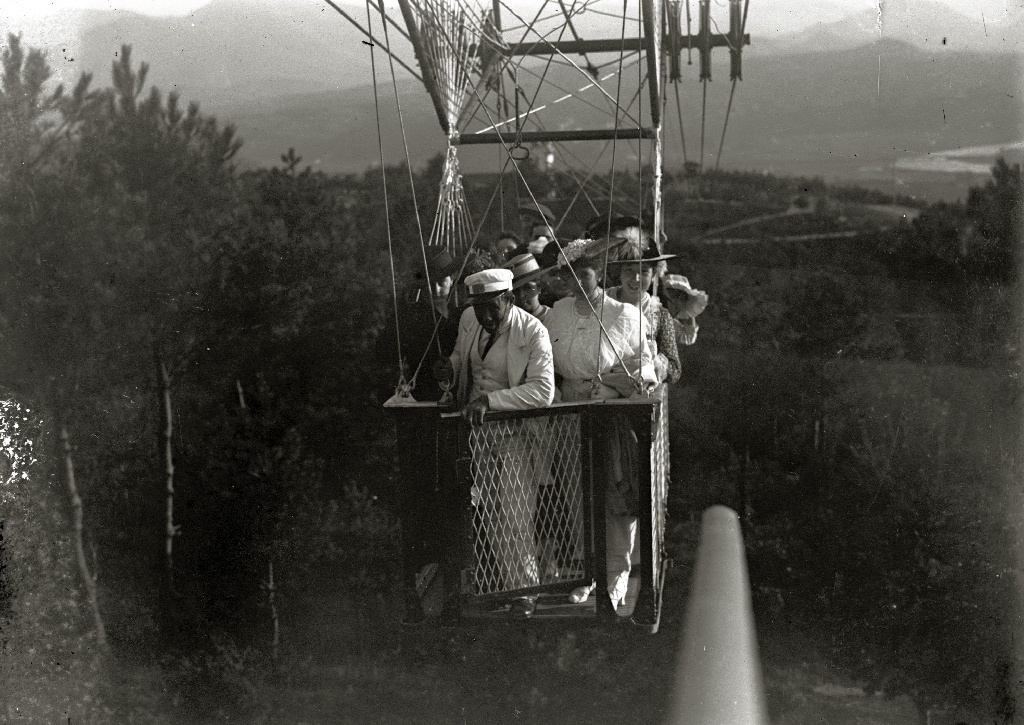
Aerial ropeway in Mount Ulia, Spain

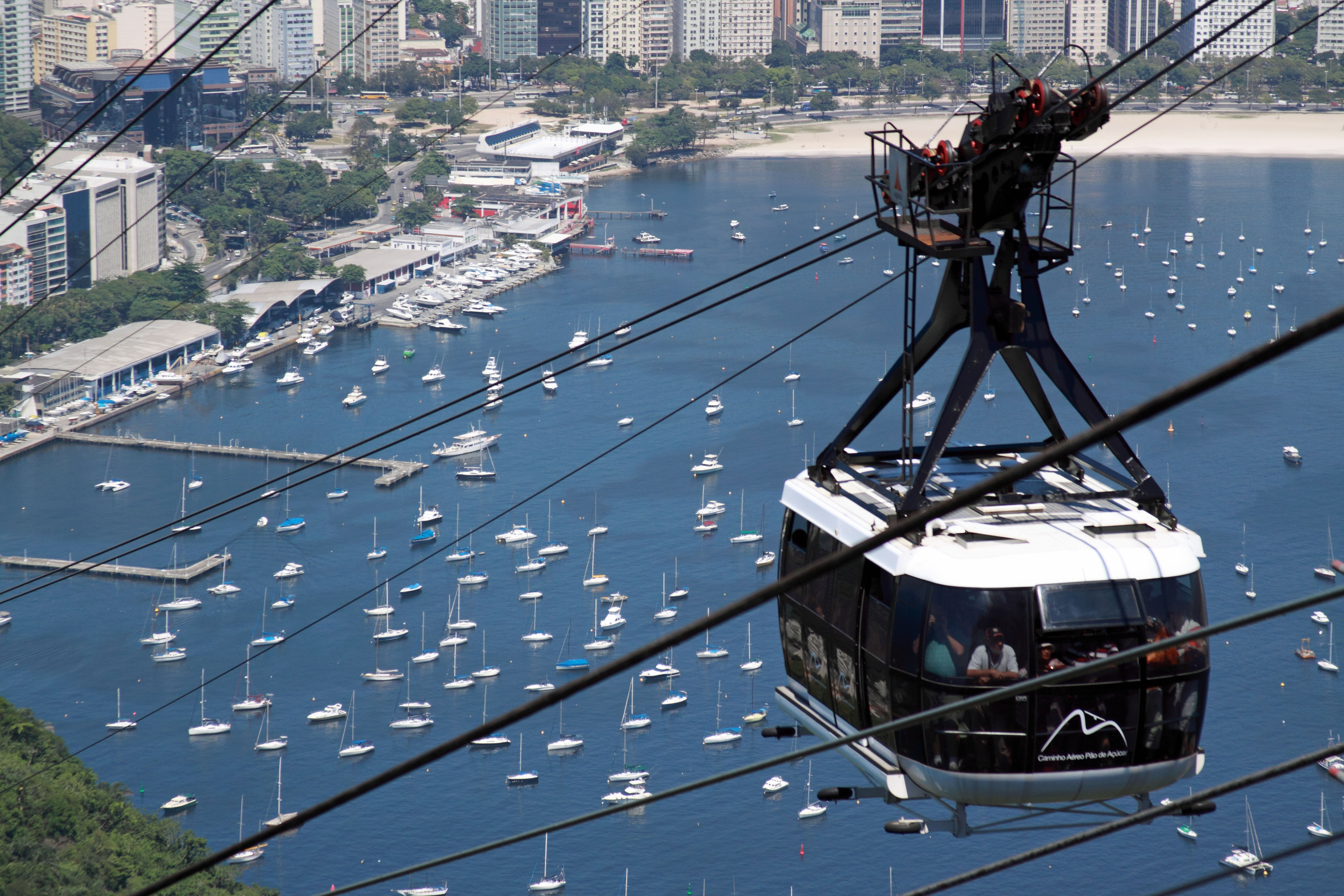
Cable car in Rio de Janeiro, Brazil

In the beginning of the 20th century, the rise of the middle class and the leisure industry allowed for investment in sight-seeing transport. Prior to 1893, a combined goods and passenger carrying cableway was installed at Gibraltar. Initially, its passengers were military personnel. An 1893 industry publication said of a two-mile system in Hong Kong that it "is the only wire tramway which has been erected exclusively for the carriage of individuals" (albeit workmen). Shortly after, in 1894, a passenger tramway operated across the Tennessee River at Knoxville, Tennessee. Following the pioneering aerial ropeway for safe public transport built on Mount Ulia in 1907 (San Sebastián, Spain)—based on an 1887 design by Leonardo Torres Quevedo—and the Wetterhorn Elevator (Grindelwald, Switzerland) in 1908, others to the top of high peaks in the Alps of Austria, Germany and Switzerland resulted. They were much less expensive to build than the earlier rack railway.

One of the first aerial trams was at Chamonix, while others in Switzerland, and Garmisch soon followed. From this, it was a natural transposition to build ski lifts and chairlifts.

Many aerial tramways were built by Von Roll Ltd. of Switzerland, later acquired by Austrian lift manufacturer Doppelmayr. Other German, Swiss, and Austrian firms played an important role in the cable car business: Bleichert, Heckel, Pohlig, PHB (Pohlig-Heckel-Bleichert), Garaventa and Waagner-Biró. Now there are three groups dominating the world market: Doppelmayr Garaventa Group, Leitner Group, and Poma, the last two being owned by one person.

Some aerial tramways have their own propulsion, such as the Lasso Mule or the Josef Mountain Aerial Tramway near Merano, Italy.

=== Urban transport ===
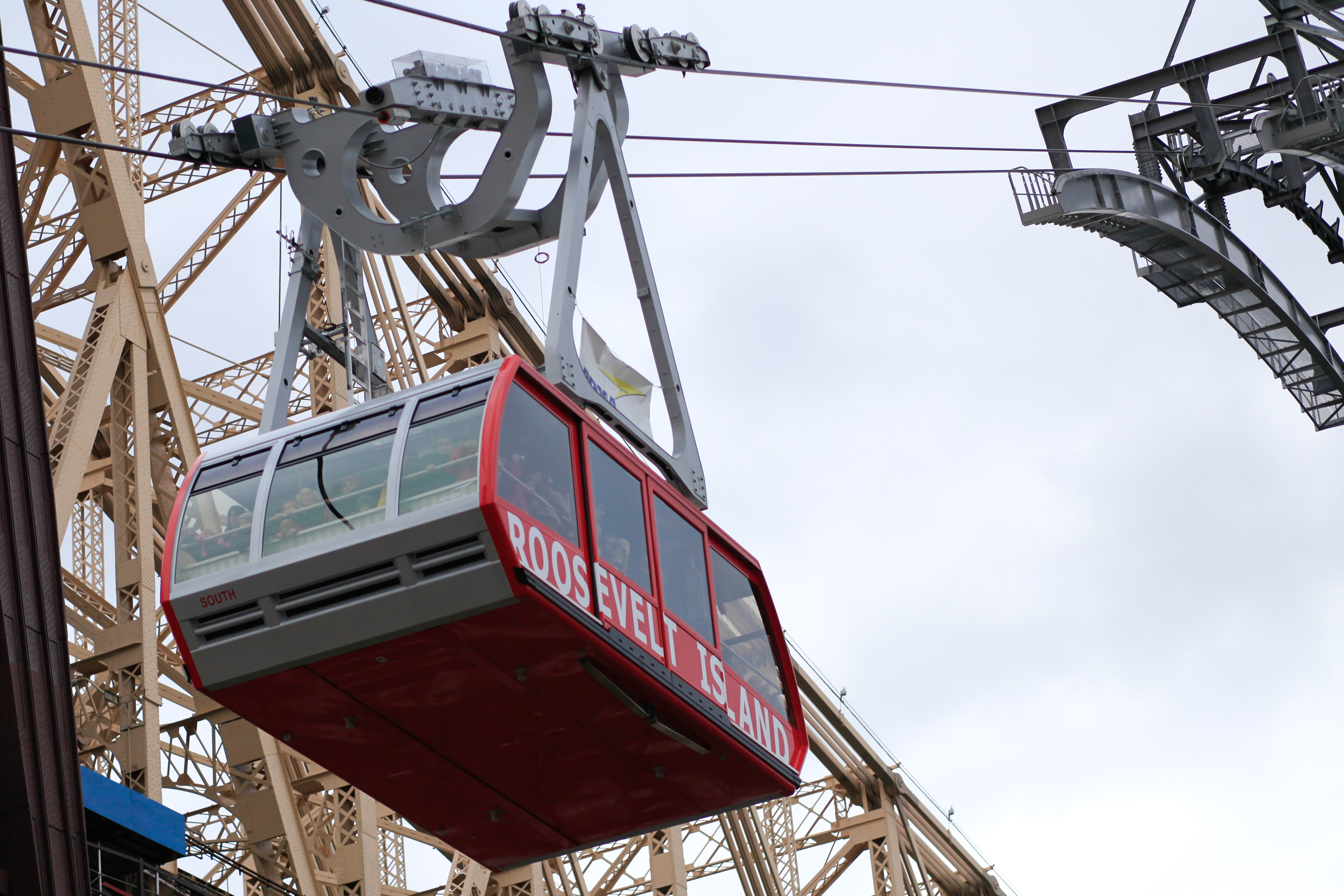
A Roosevelt Island Tramway car in operation

While typically used for ski resorts, aerial tramways have come into use in the urban environment. The 1976 Roosevelt Island Tramway in New York City, the 2004 Line K of the Metrocable system in Medellin, Colombia, Mi Teleférico cable-car system in La Paz, Bolivia, comprising 10 lines, the 2022 Rakavlit cable car in Haifa, Israel and the 2006 Portland Aerial Tram are examples where this technology has been successfully adapted for public transport.

=== Telpherage ===
The telpherage concept was first publicised in 1883 and several experimental lines were constructed. It was designed to compete not with railways, but with horses and carts.

The first commercial telpherage line was in Glynde, which is in Sussex, England. It was built to connect a newly opened clay pit to the local railway station and opened in 1885.

=== Double deckers ===
There are aerial tramways with double deck cabins. The Vanoise Express cable car carries 200 people in each cabin at a height of 380 m (1,247 ft) over the Ponturin gorge in France. The Shinhotaka Ropeway carries 121 people in each cabin at Mount Hotaka in Japan. The CabriO cable car to the summit of the Stanserhorn in Switzerland carries 60 persons, with the upper floor accommodating 30 people in the open air.

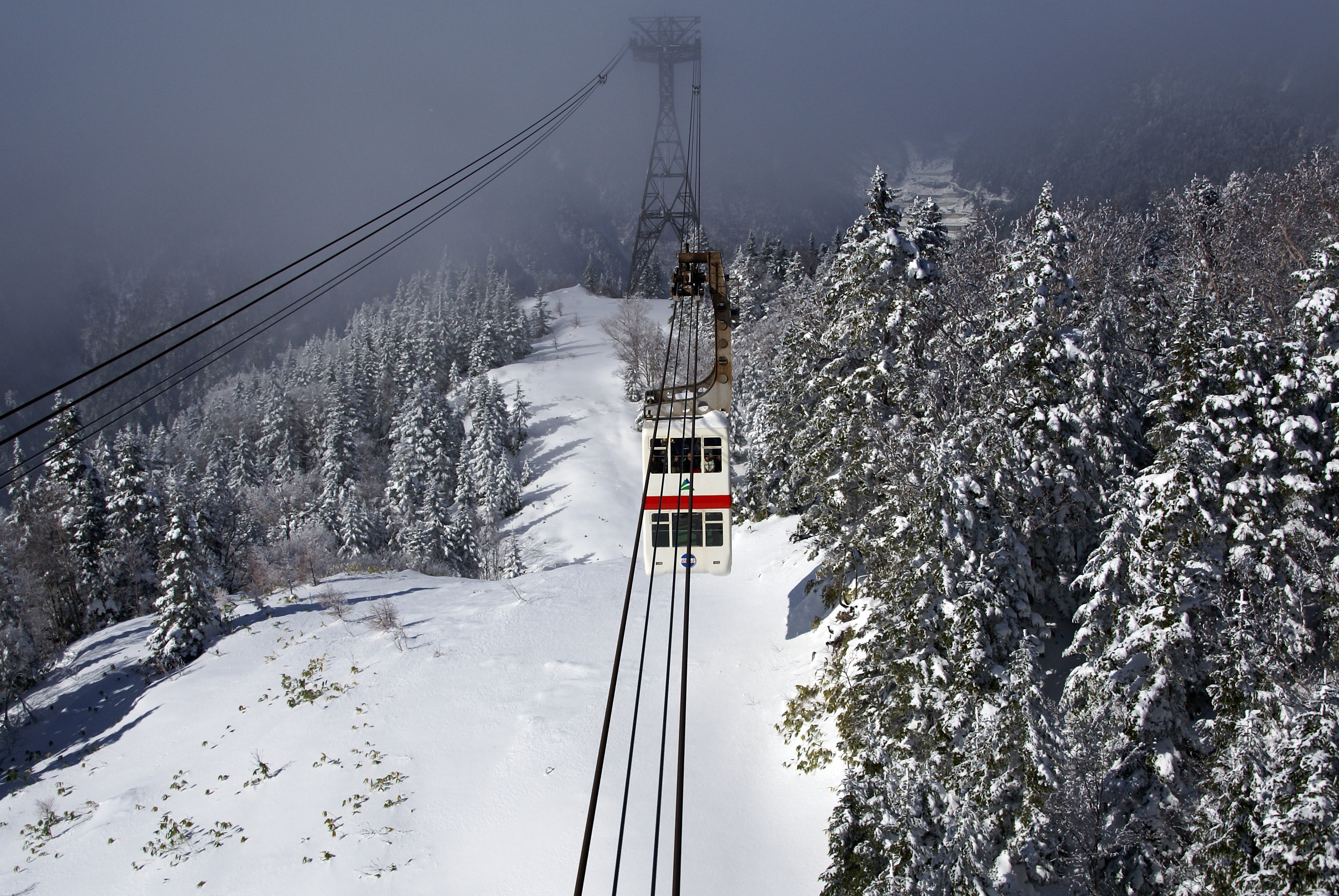
Shinhotaka Ropeway

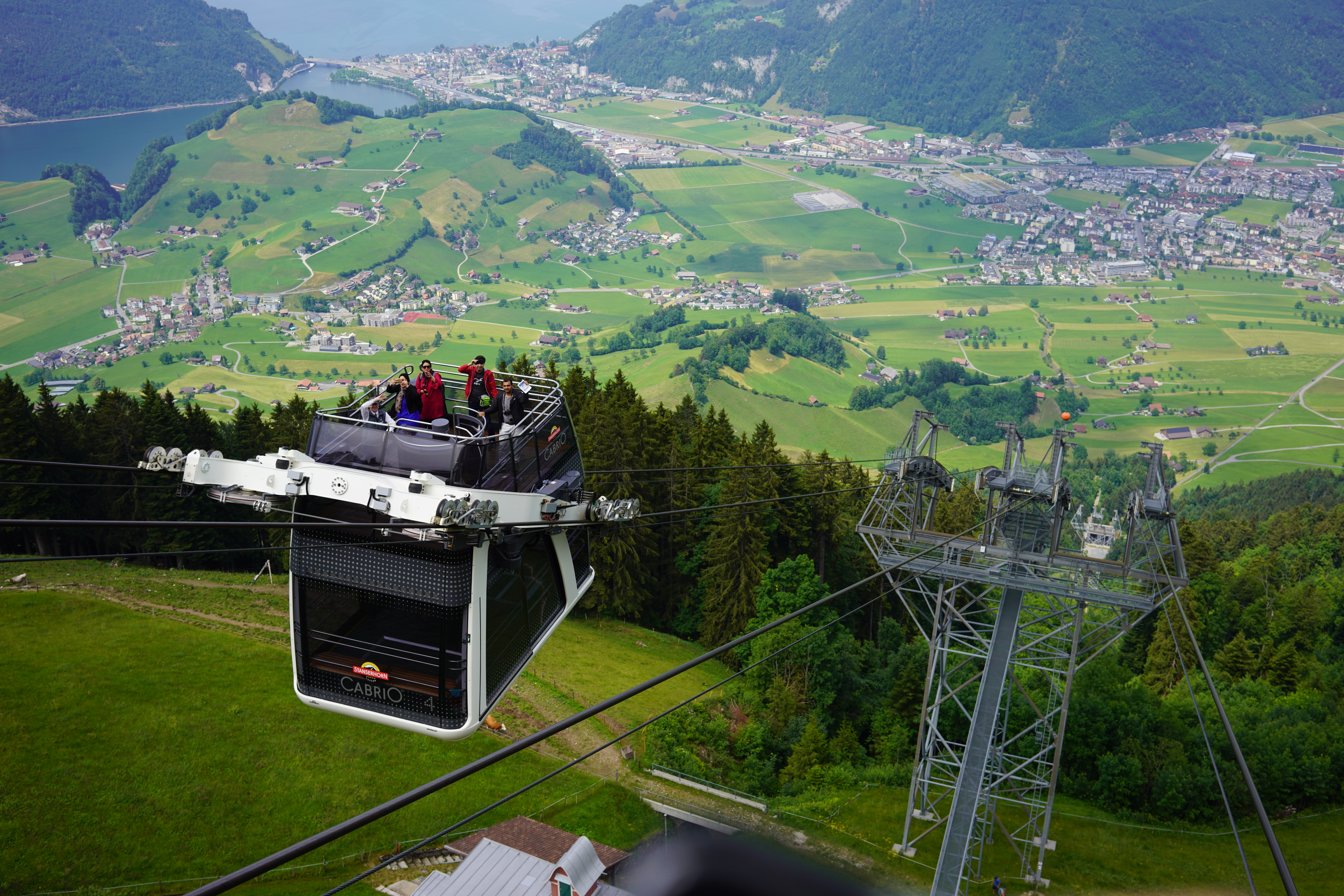
Stanserhorn cabriolet ropeway with adapted pylon

== Records ==
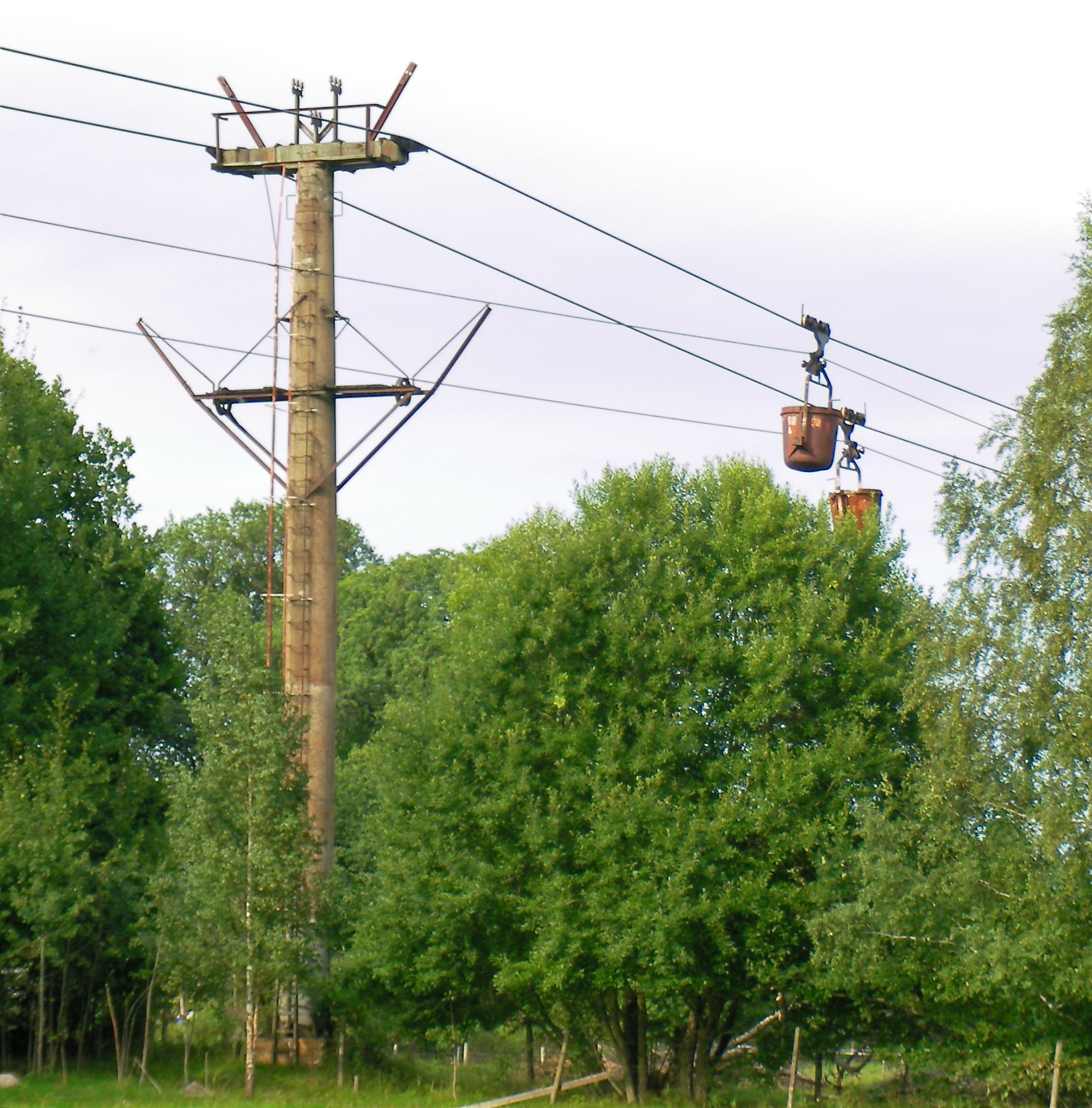
World's longest functioning aerial tramway, 1987–2013: Forsby-Köping

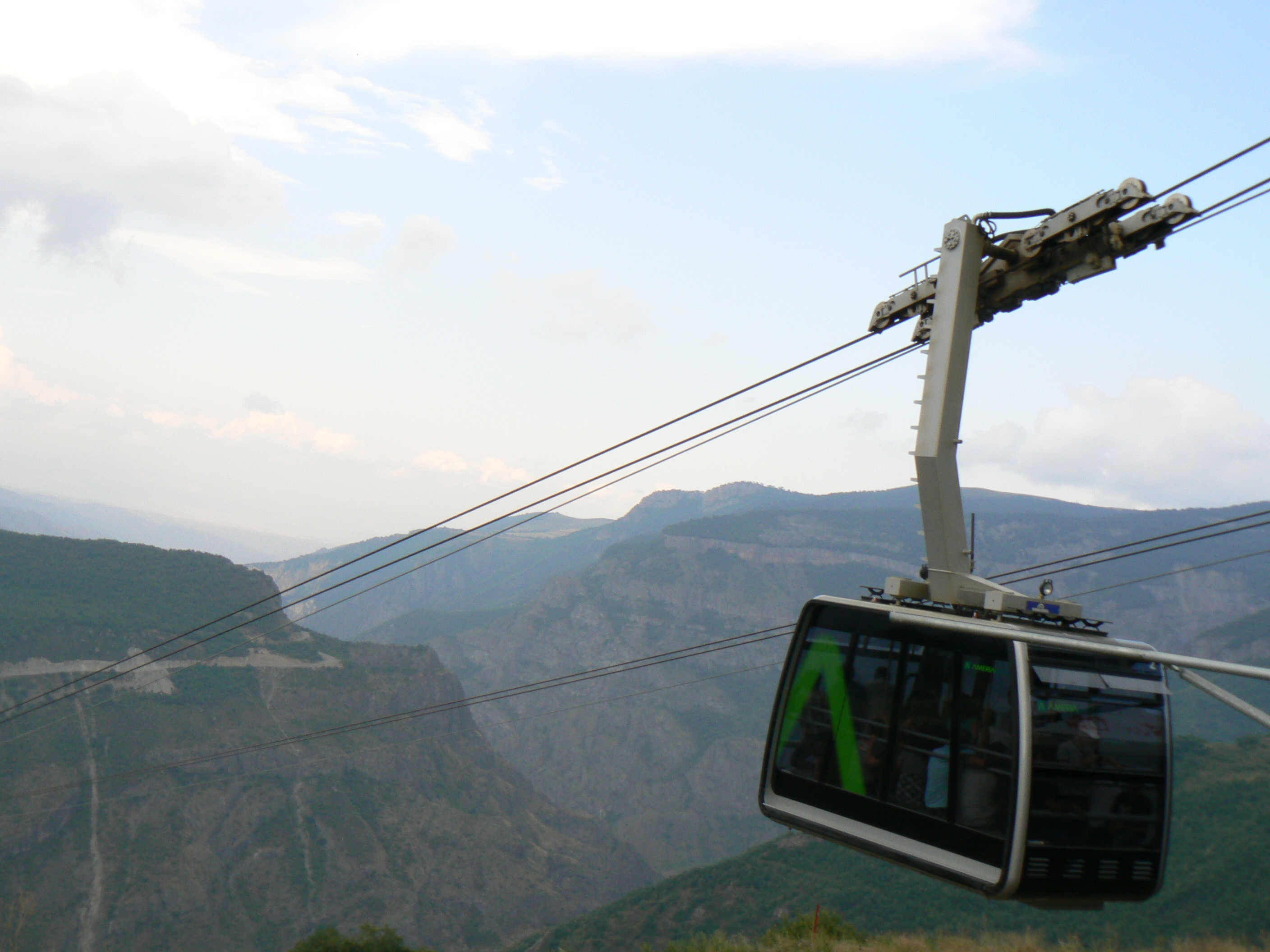
Wings of Tatev, Armenia, the world's longest reversible cable car line of one section

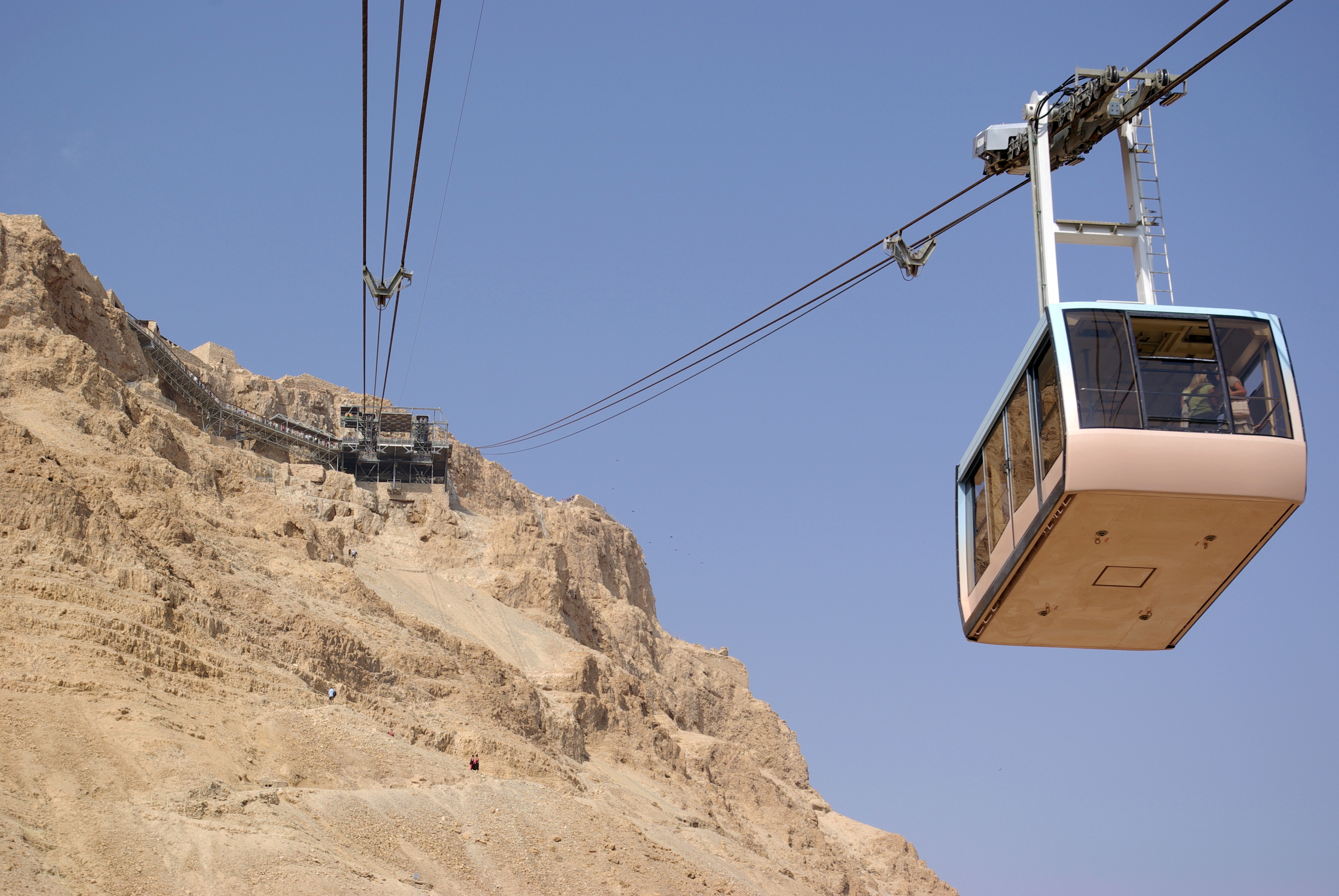
Masada cableway has the world's lowest station.

- First – Adam Wybe's construction in Gdańsk (1644). It was the first rope railway with many supports and the biggest built until the end of 19th century.
- Longest (at time of building) and years operated:
  - 35 km (22 mi) 1906–1927 Chilecito – Mina La Mejicana, Argentina (34.3 km or 21.3 mi and 0.86 km or 0.53 mi branch).
  - 39 km (24 mi) 1925–1950 Dúrcal – Motril, Spain (33.4 km or 20.8 mi and 5.5 km or 3.4 mi branch).
  - 75 km (47 mi) 1937–1941 Asmara – Massawa, Eritrea (71.8 km or 44.6 mi and 3 km or 1.9 mi branch), technically a Funifor.
  - 96 km (60 mi) 1943–1987 Kristineberg-Boliden, Sweden. 13.2 km (8.2 mi) still working as the Norsjö ropeway.
- Second longest:
  - 76 km (47 mi) 1959–1986 Moanda – Mbinda, Gabon – Republic of Congo.
- Longest over water:
  - 1.0 km (0.62 mi) 1906 – the same century; Thio, New Caledonia. ship loading.
  - 2.4 km (1.5 mi) 1941–2006 Forsby-Köping limestone cableway, Sweden. crossing of Hjälmaren strait. 42 km (26 mi) system.
  - 3.0 km (1.9 mi) 2007 Nha Trang City – Vinpearl Land, Hon Tre Island, Vietnam. Total length 3.3 km (2.1 mi).
- Longest currently operational:
  - 13.2 km (8.2 mi) Norsjö aerial tramway Mensträsk-Bjurfors in Norsjö, Sweden. Passenger tramway, a section of the former 96 km (60 mi) Kristineberg-Boliden industrial ropeway.
  - 12.5 km (7.8 mi) Mérida cable car Mérida, Venezuela.
  - 6.07 km (3.77 mi) Grindelwald–Männlichen gondola cableway, Switzerland
  - 5.7 km (3.5 mi) Wings of Tatev, Armenia, the world's longest reversible cable car line of one section.
  - 4.94 km (3.07 mi) Medeu-Shimbulak tramway near Almaty, Kazakhstan.
  - 4.35 km (2.70 mi) Sandia Peak Tramway, reversible tramway in Albuquerque, New Mexico.
- Highest lift:
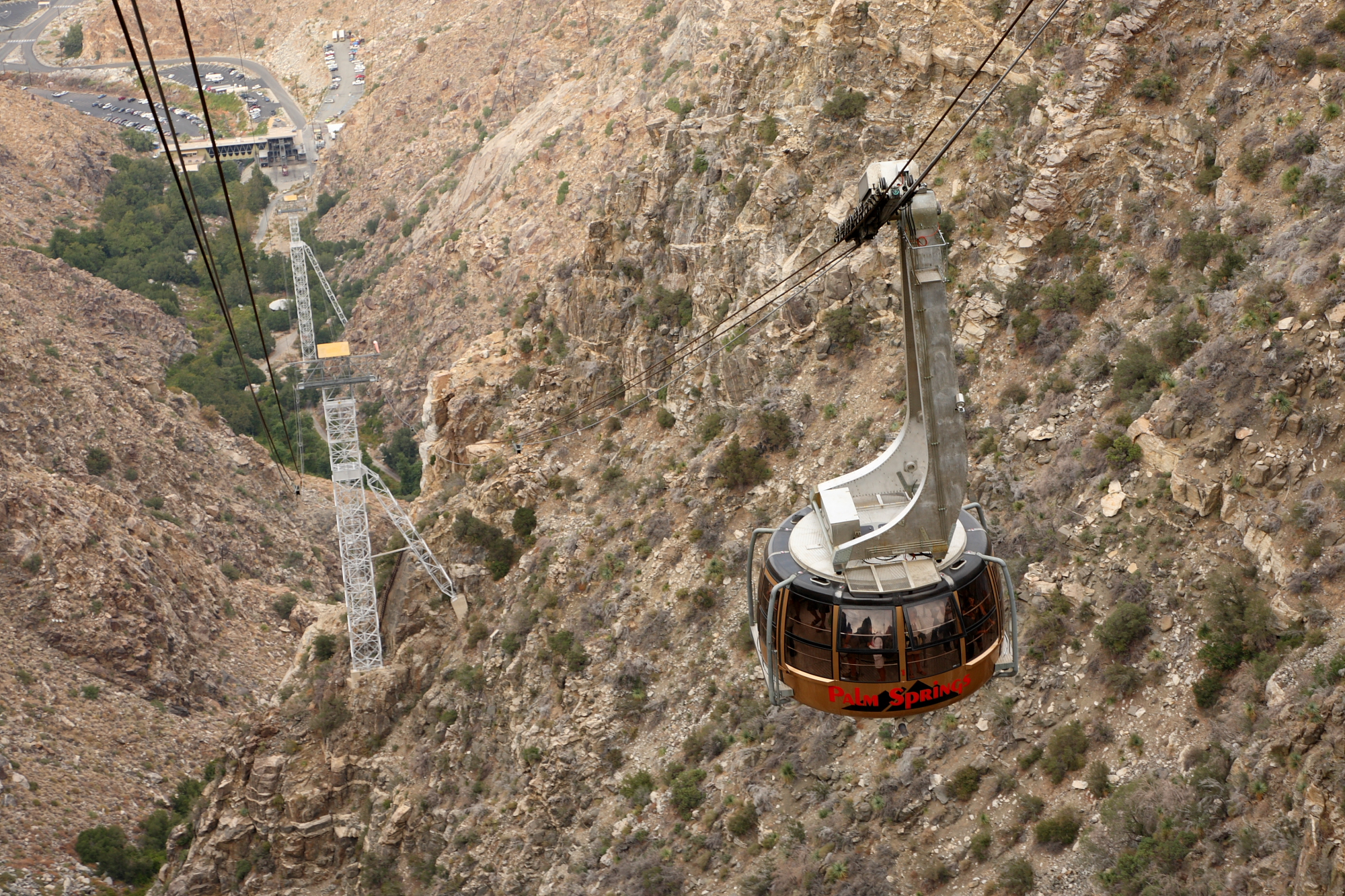
  - Palm Springs Aerial Tramway, the largest rotating aerial tramway in the world
    3,374 m (11,070 ft) from 1,074 to 4,448 m (3,524 to 14,593 ft) at Chilecito – Mina La Mejicana, Argentina (drops back to 4,404 m (2.737 mi) at upper terminal).
- Highest lift currently operational:
  - 3188 m (10,459 ft) from 1,577 MSL to 4,765 MSL (5,174 FAMSL to 15,633 FAMSL) Mérida cable car, Venezuela.
- Highest station:
  - Greater than 5,874 m (19,272 ft) 1935-19?? Aucanquilcha, Chile.
- Lowest station:
  - 257 m (843 ft) below sea level Masada cableway, Israel.
- Tallest support tower:
  - 214.8 m (704.7 ft) Cat Hai – Phu Long cable car, Vietnam.
- As mass transit:
  - The Roosevelt Island Tramway in New York City was the first aerial tramway in North America used by commuters as a mode of mass transit (See Transportation in New York City). Passengers pay with the same farecard used for the New York City Subway.
  - The Portland Aerial Tram in Portland, Oregon, was opened in January 2007 and became the second public transportation aerial tramway in North America.
  - In Medellin, Colombia, both the Metro and the recent Metrocable aerial tramway addition can be used while paying a single fare.
- Largest rotating cars:
  - Palm Springs Aerial Tramway in Palm Springs, California.

== List of accidents ==
Despite the introduction of various safety measures (back-up power generators, evacuation plans, etc.) there have been several serious incidents on aerial tramways, some fatal.

- August 15, 1960: Four people were killed and six injured when a passenger cabin on the Monte Faito cableway fell 60 feet (18 m) on to the track of the Vesuvius railway. One of the main cables slipped off its pulley when the cabin approached the lower terminal. The car hit the terminal building, killing the conductor and three passengers.
- August 29, 1961: A military plane split the hauling cable of the Vallée Blanche Aerial Tramway on the Aiguille du Midi in the Mont Blanc massif: six people killed.
- July 9, 1974: Ulriksbanen is an aerial tramway in Bergen, Norway, operated by a tow rope, which hauls it, and a carrying rope. On July 9, 1974, as the carriage reached its destination at the top station and just as the carriage operator was about to open the doors, the tow rope broke. The carriage operator was thrown into the back of the vehicle, preventing him from reaching the emergency brake. The carriage began whizzing down the still intact carrying rope, gathering speed quickly and approaching the first vertical mast about 70 meters away. Because the tow rope was broken, it was no longer taut at the point where it crossed over the mast — as the carriage crossed the mast, the broken tow rope jammed up and caused the carriage to jump off the carrying rope and begin to free-fall straight down towards the ground 15 meters below. The carriage crashed to the ground on a downslope, causing the carriage to careen down the mountainside a further 30 meters before it was crushed up against some boulders, finally coming to a stop. Four of the eight occupants were killed.
- March 9, 1976: In the Italian Dolomites at Cavalese, a cab fell after a rope broke, killing 43. (See 1976 Cavalese cable car crash)
- April 15, 1978: In a storm, two carrying ropes of the Squaw Valley Aerial Tramway in California fell from the aerial tramway support tower. One of the ropes partly destroyed the cabin. Four were killed, 32 injured.
- June 1, 1990: Nineteen were killed and fifteen injured after a hauling rope broke in the 1990 Tbilisi Cable car accident
- February 3, 1998: U.S. Marine Corps EA-6B Prowler jets severed the cable of an aerial ropeway in Cavalese, Italy, killing 20 people. (See Cavalese cable car disaster (1998))
- July 1, 1999: Saint-Étienne-en-Dévoluy, France. An aerial tramway car detached from the cable it was traveling on and fell 80 metres (260 ft) to the valley floor, killing all 20 occupants. The majority were employees and contractors of an international astronomical observatory run by the Institut de Radioastronomie Millémétrique. (See Saint-Étienne-en-Dévoluy cable car disaster)
- October 19, 2003: Four were killed and 11 injured when three cars slipped off the cable of the Darjeeling Ropeway.
- April 2, 2004: In Yerevan, Armenia on an urban cable car one of the two cabins derailed from the steel track cable and fell 15 m (49 ft) to the ground killing five, including two Iranians, and injuring 11 others. The second cabin slammed onto the lower station injuring three people.
- October 9, 2004: Crash of a cabin of the Grünberg aerial tramway in Gmunden, Austria. Many injuries.
- December 31, 2012: The Alyeska Resort Aerial Tramway was blown sideways while operating in high winds and was impaled on the tower guide, severely damaging the contacting cabin. Only minor injuries were incurred.
- December 4, 2018, an exterior panel of the Portland Aerial Tram dropped at least 100 feet (30 m) and struck a pedestrian walking below.
- May 23, 2021: 14 people were killed when a cable failed 300 m from the top of the Mottarone mountain.
- October 21, 2021: One person died after a cable car cabin became detached from its cable at the Ještěd mountain in Liberec, Czech Republic.
- April 12, 2024: One person died and seven people were injured after a cable car cabin hit a pole and burst open in Antalya, Turkey.
- April 17, 2025: A cable car of the Monte Faito cableway crashed to the ground after a cable snapped, killing at least four people and critically injuring one. The snapped cable brought both the upward and downward-going cable cars to a halt as they traversed Monte Faito. The upward cable car eventually crashed, causing the fatalities and injury, while eight tourists and an operator were evacuated from the downward cable car.

== Gallery ==
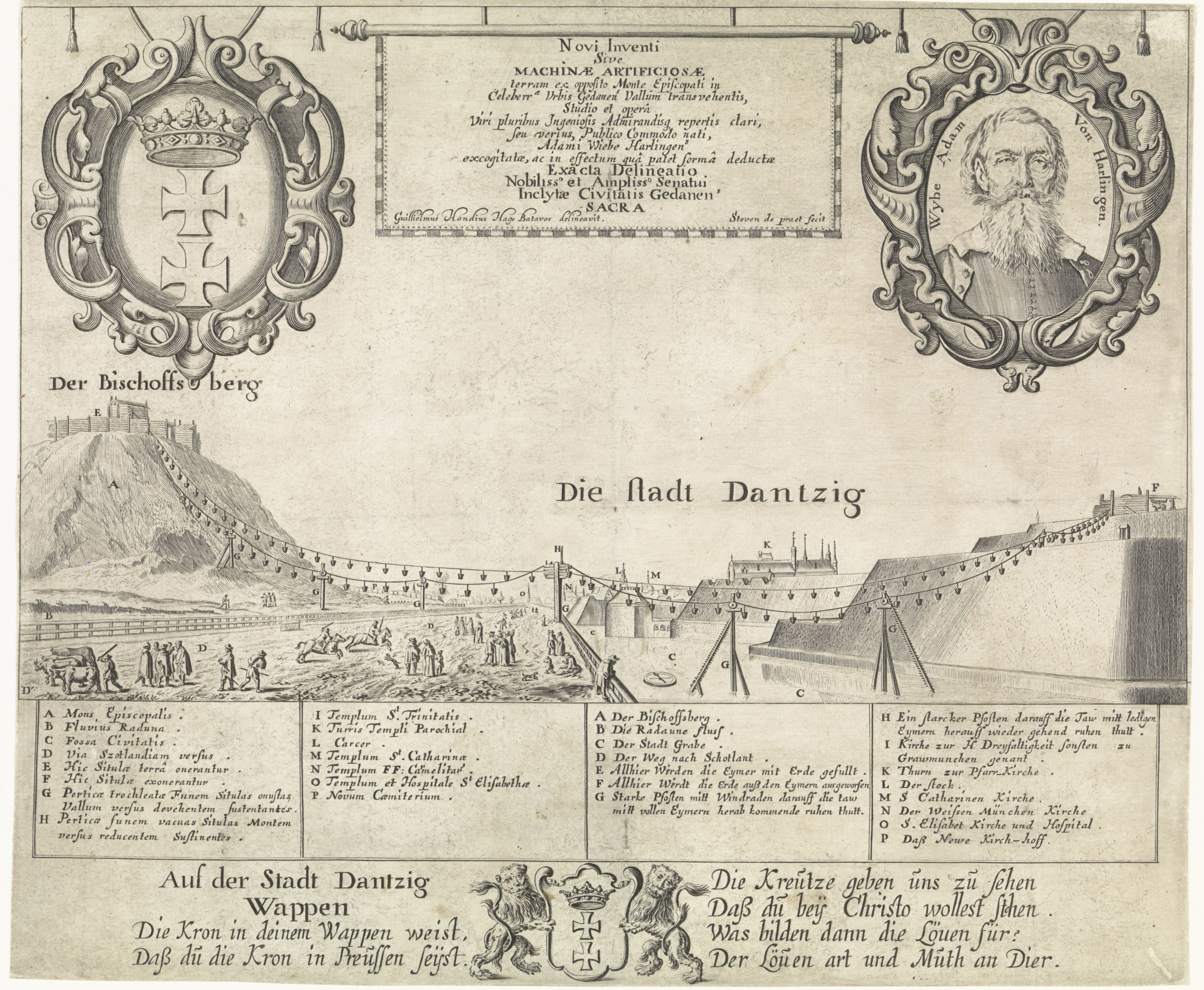
Adam Wybe's cable car in Gdańsk. Etching by Willem Hondius

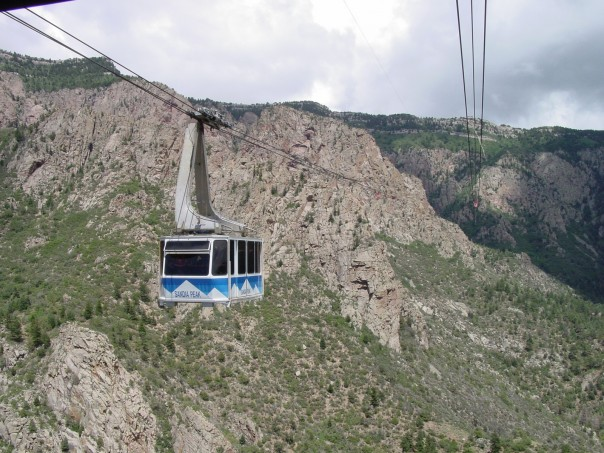
Cable cars pass mid-stream on the Sandia Peak Tramway in Albuquerque, New Mexico.

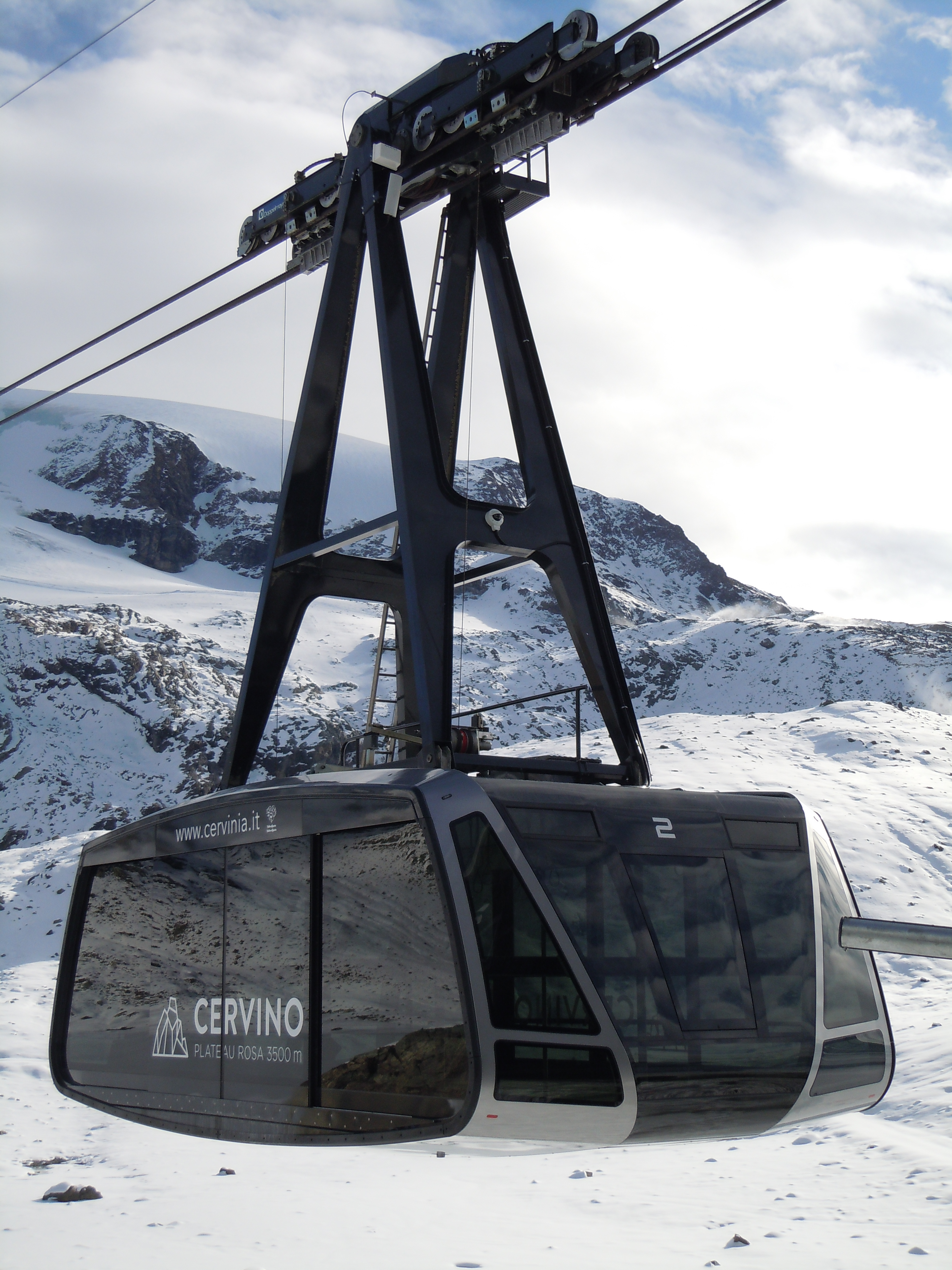
Testa Grigia aerial tramway in Cervinia, Italy, moves skiers to 3480 m glacier.

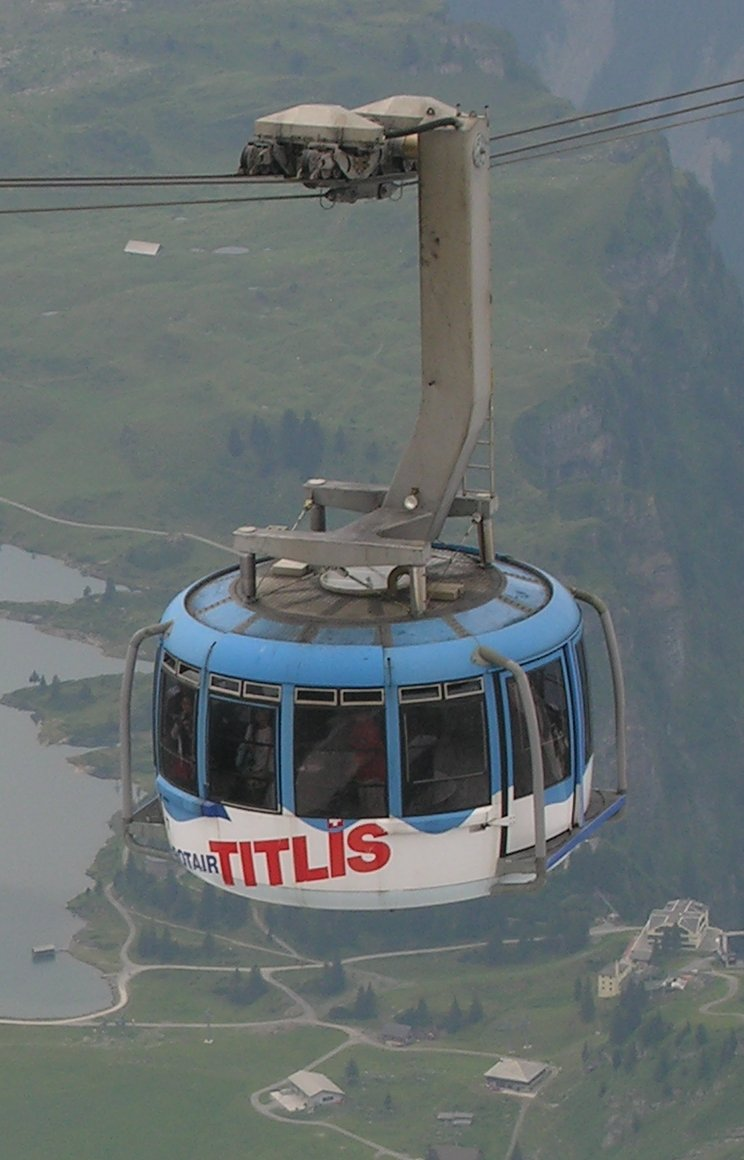
The rotating construction of the Titlis gondola provides passengers better view

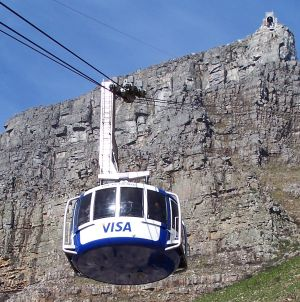
The rotating Table Mountain Aerial Cableway is designed to give passengers a 360° view.

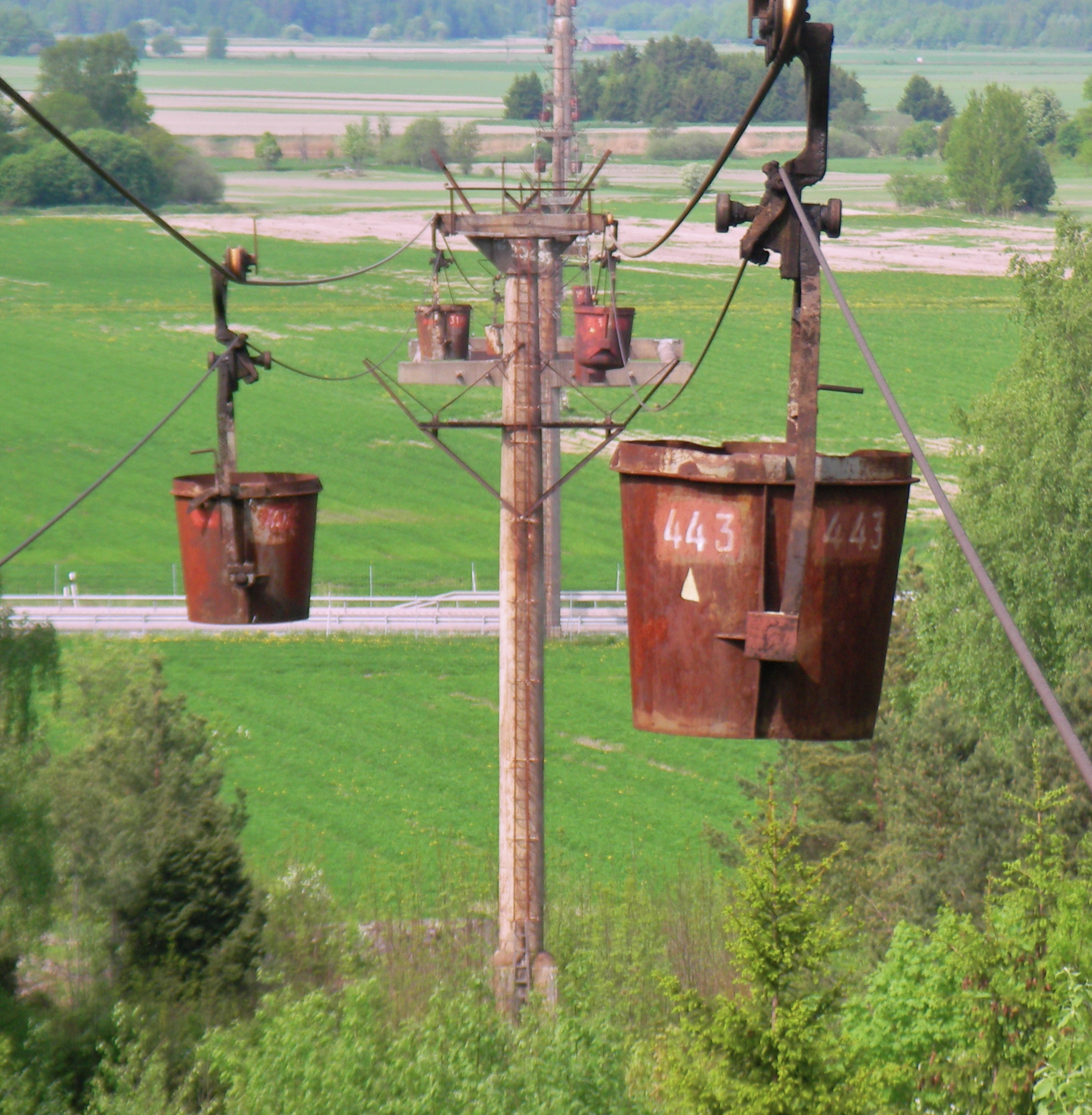
Ropeway conveyor for limestone transportation in Sweden

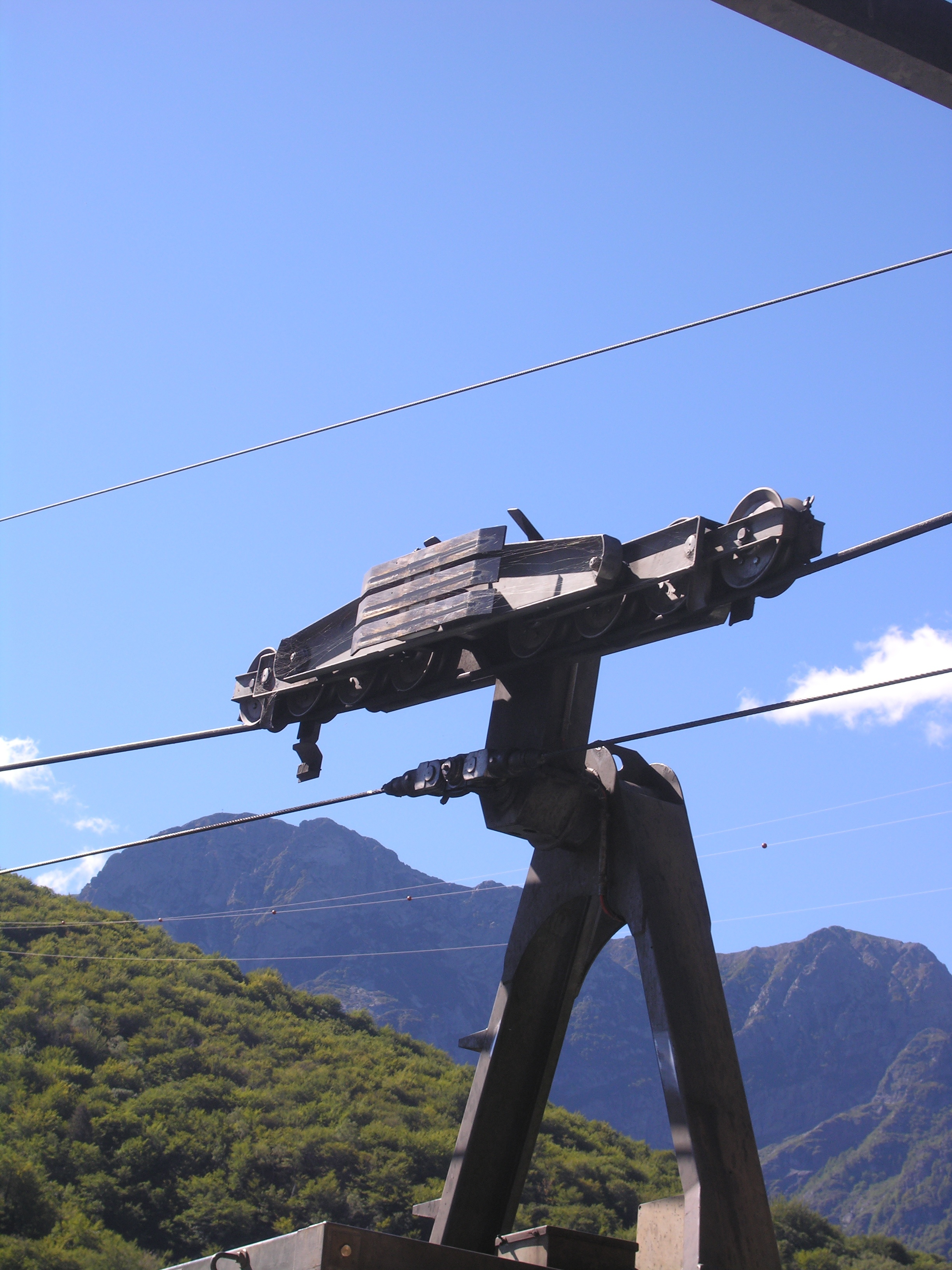
Aerial tramway from Intragna to Rasa, Ticino, Switzerland.The lower cable is used for pulling. The middle cable supports the weight of gondola.The role of the third cable is not clear

== See also ==
- Aerial lift
- Aerial lift pylon
- Blondin (quarry equipment)
- Cable car
- Cable ferry
- Cable transport
- Chairlift
- COMILOG Cableway in Moanda
- Funitel
- Funicular
- Gondola lift
- List of aerial tramways
- List of aerial lift manufacturers
- List of spans
- Riblet Tramway Company
- Roosevelt Island Tramway
- Ropeway conveyor
- Skiing
- Transport
- Transporter bridge
- Zip-line
