= Josef Mountain Aerial Tramway =

Aerial tramway in Italy

Josef Mountain Aerial Tramway is an aerial tramway near Meran in Northern Italy. It was built in 1979 and it belongs to the few aerial tramways for person transportation at which the cabin, built by the company Hans Trojer, had its own engine (an air-cooled VW Engine) above the cabin. The drive concept was patented. A single passenger could operate and use the tramway without support. It was not for public operation and was dismantled in the late 1990s. Today, the concrete structure of the valley station is still visible, albeit a bit overgrown.
