= Yangtze River Cableway =

Aerial tramway in Chongqing, China

- 长江索道
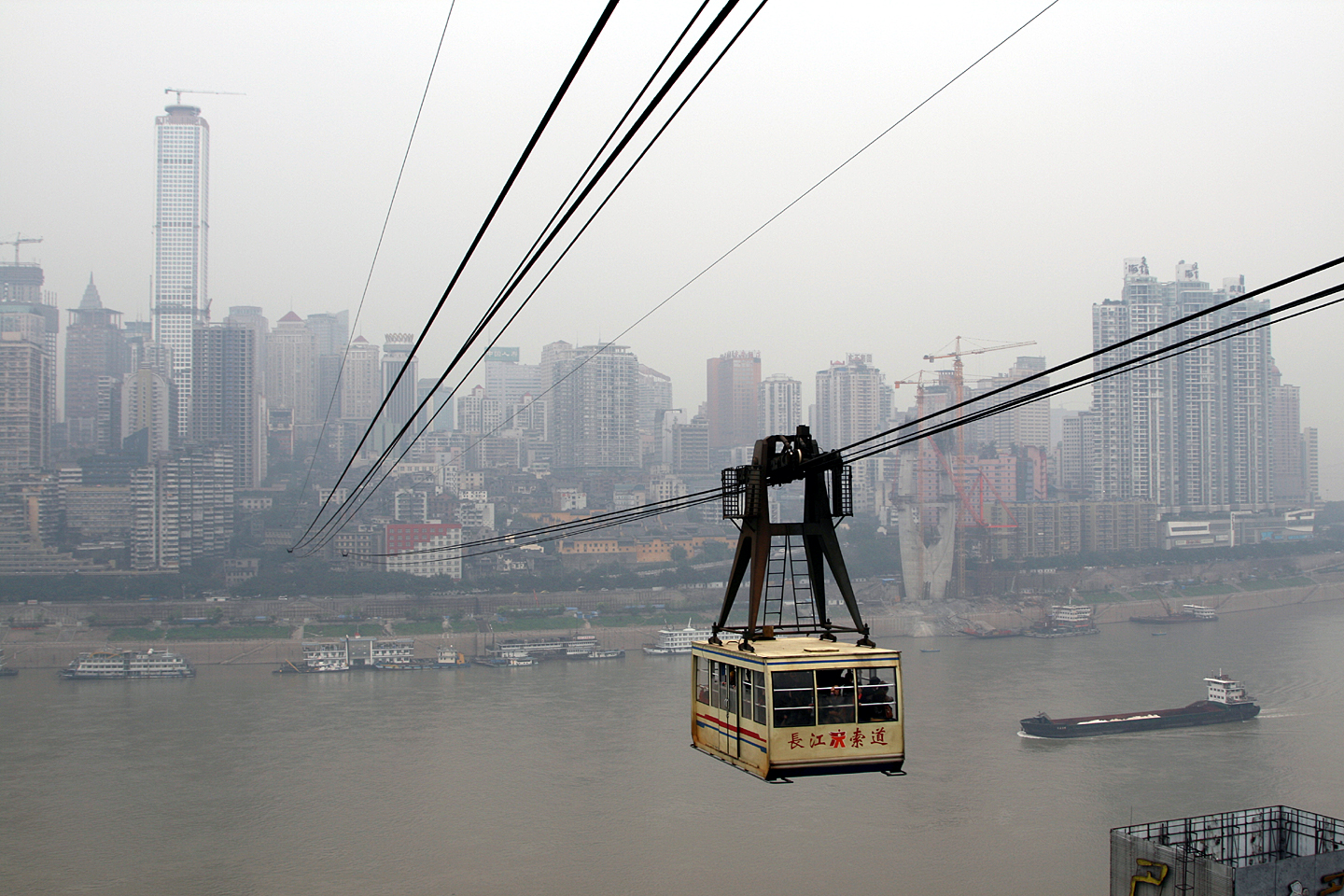
- Yangtze River Ropeway with Yuzhong District in the background
- Interactive map of Yangtze River Cableway

Overview
- Status: Operational
- Character: Urban
- Location: 151 Xinhua Road, Yuzhong, Chongqing
- Country: China
- Termini: Xinhualu; Shangxinjie (Longmenhao)
- No. of stations: 2
- Construction cost: CN¥14.5 million (Int'l$15.6 million in 2015)
- Construction begin: March 20, 1986; 40 years ago
- Open: October 24, 1987; 38 years ago
- Website: http://www.cqsuodao.com/en/

Operation
- Operator: Chongqing Passenger Cableway Co, Ltd
- No. of carriers: 2
- Carrier capacity: 81
- Operating times: 7:30–22:30
- Trip duration: 3.6 minutes

Technical features
- Aerial lift type: Aerial tramway
- Line length: 1,166 m (3,825 ft)
- No. of cables: 2
- Operating speed: 6 m/s (20 ft/s)
- Vertical Interval: 47 m (154 ft)

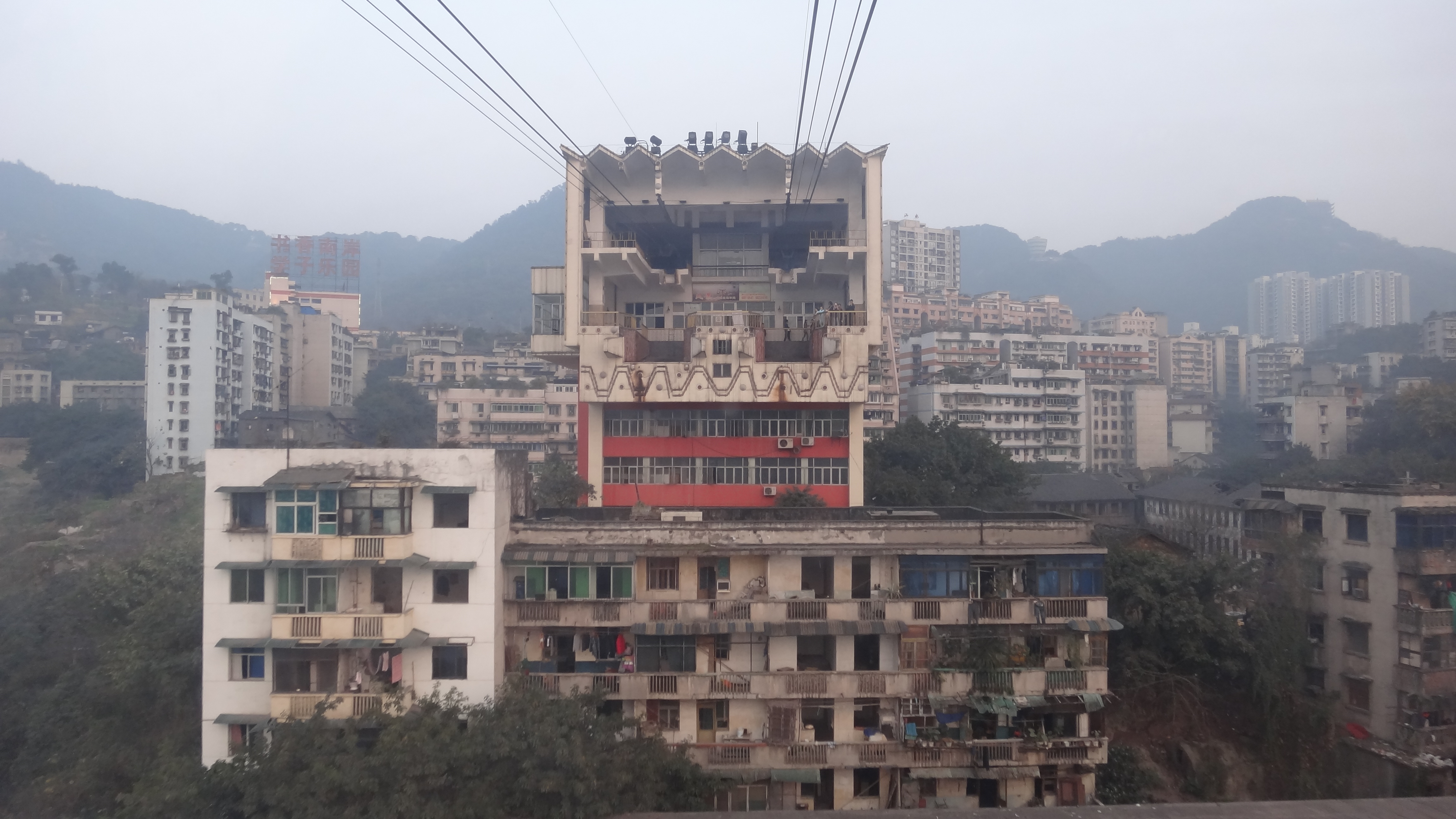
Longmenhao station

Yangtze River Cableway is an aerial tramway line in downtown Chongqing, which initially opened in 1987. It has been listed in Batch II of Chongqing Cultural Relics Protected Buildings since December 15, 2009.

== Fares ==
	Peak hours	Off-peak
Single-journey ticket	CN¥ 20.0	CN¥ 20.0
Yiju Changtong Card (Note: the local transport card)	CN¥ 1.8	CN¥ 18.0
