= Boliden AB =

Swedish multinational metals, mining and smelting company

- Type: Publicly traded Aktiebolag
- Traded as: Nasdaq Stockholm: BOL
- ISIN: SE0000869646
- Industry: Metals and Mining
- Founded: 1924; 102 years ago
- Headquarters: Stockholm, Sweden
- Key people: Karl-Henrik Sundström (Chairman); Mikael Staffas (President and CEO)
- Products: Copper, zinc, nickel, lead, precious metals, sulphuric acid, PGM, iron sand
- Revenue: ▼78.554 billion kr (2023)
- Operating income: ▼8.287 billion kr (2023)
- Net income: ▼6.074 billion kr (2023)
- Total assets: ▲101.957 billion kr (2023)
- Total equity: ▼56.420 billion kr (2023)
- Number of employees: ▼5,664 (2023)
- Website: www.boliden.com

Boliden AB (stylized as Boliden) is a Swedish multinational metals, mining, and smelting company headquartered in Stockholm. The company produces zinc, copper, lead, nickel, silver, and gold, with operations in Sweden, Finland, Norway, Portugal, and Ireland.

Founded in the 1920s and named after the Boliden mine, a now-defunct gold mine 30 km northwest of the Swedish town of Skellefteå, Boliden AB began as a gold mining company. Over the following decades, it expanded into copper, silver and nickel mining, as well as smelting. In the 1970s, following a period of high metals prices, the company diversified aggressively, purchasing appliance manufacturers, wholesalers and trading companies. In 1985, it was acquired by Trelleborg, a polymer manufacturer, which refocused it back on mining while also expanding overseas. In 1998, Trelleborg moved Boliden's headquarters to Toronto, Canada and sold Boliden again on the stock market. However, Boliden's share price collapsed over the next four years, due to a combination of low metal prices and a dam failure at one of its mines in Spain that led to an environmental disaster. In 2002, it moved its headquarters back to Sweden, sold off its non-European assets and regained profitability.

Boliden owns and operates Europe's biggest zinc mine at Tara in Ireland (acquired in 2004). Boliden also owns Garpenberg, a zinc-lead mine and Sweden's oldest mine still in operation. The mineral-rich Skellefte field lies within the Boliden Area, where almost 30 mines have been opened since production began in the 1920s and where Boliden currently operates the Renström and Kristineberg underground mines and the Maurliden open pit mine. Boliden also owns and operates the Aitik copper mine.

Boliden refines both metal concentrate and scrap waste at its smelters in Sweden, Finland and Norway to produce base metals and precious metals. Its main metals are zinc and copper, but the production of lead, gold and silver also makes a substantial contribution to its revenues. It is also a significant producer of sulfuric acid as a refining byproduct.

== Operations ==
Boliden's active mines and smelters as of 2025

| Mine | Main metals | Acquired |
|---|---|---|
| Renström mine | Zinc, copper | 1952 |
| Garpenberg | Zinc, lead | 1957 |
| Kankberg mine | Tellurium, gold | 1960s |
| Aitik mine | Copper | 1968 |
| Tara Mine | Zinc, lead | 2003 |
| Kevitsa mine | Copper, nickel | 2016 |
| Neves-Corvo | Zinc, copper | 2025 |
| Zinkgruvan | Zinc, lead | 2025 |

=== Mines ===
Boliden is active in mining, refining, smelting and chemical production. As of 2025, Boliden operates seven mines, all of them in Europe (see table). Its mining activities are primarily in zinc and copper, as well as some lead, gold, silver. The mines are geographically concentrated in Sweden, but the company also operates a mine each in Finland, Ireland and Portugal. Its most productive mine in 2024 was Aitik producing 41 million tonnes of ore, followed by Kevitsa, with 10 million tonnes. Aitik is Europe's fourth-biggest copper mine despite having relatively low-grade ore (0.2–0.4%); it owes its productivity to its large economies of scale and high degree of automation.

Boliden spent SEK 929 million SEK (US$88 million) on exploration in 2024.

=== Smelters ===
Boliden also owns and operates five smelters. Rönnskär, Boliden's oldest smelter, is located in northern Sweden and produces primarily copper and sulfuric acid, as well as some lead and zinc. Norzinc, a smelter in Odda, Norway, produces zinc and sulfuric acid. Bergsöe, a lead smelter in the southern Swedish town of Landskrona, is a lead-acid battery recycling plant. A smelter in Harjavalta in southern Finland chiefly produces copper and nickel, as well as minor amounts of gold, silver and palladium. A smelter in Kokkola, northern Finland, produces zinc.

Kokkola is specialized in the production of "special high-grade zinc", which is used in galvanization. The Odda zinc smelter, which produces zinc for the steel industry and aluminium fluoride for Norway's aluminium industry, is located on the west coast of Norway. The Rönnskär copper smelter also produces metals from electronic scrap and other secondary materials. The Harjavalta copper smelter, located on the west coast of Finland, produces copper cathodes that are mainly sold to manufacturers of semi-finished goods. Bergsöe is one of Europe's four biggest players in the lead recycling industry. Approximately 60% of the plant's lead production is sold to the European battery industry, with the remainder used in the manufacture of roofing sheet.

Only around 40–50% of the raw materials Boliden refines at its smelters are from its own mines. Most of the remainder is sourced from other mining companies. 5–10% of its raw copper, nickel and zinc, as well as 60% of its raw lead feed, is from recycling scrap.

== History ==
=== 1920s: founding ===
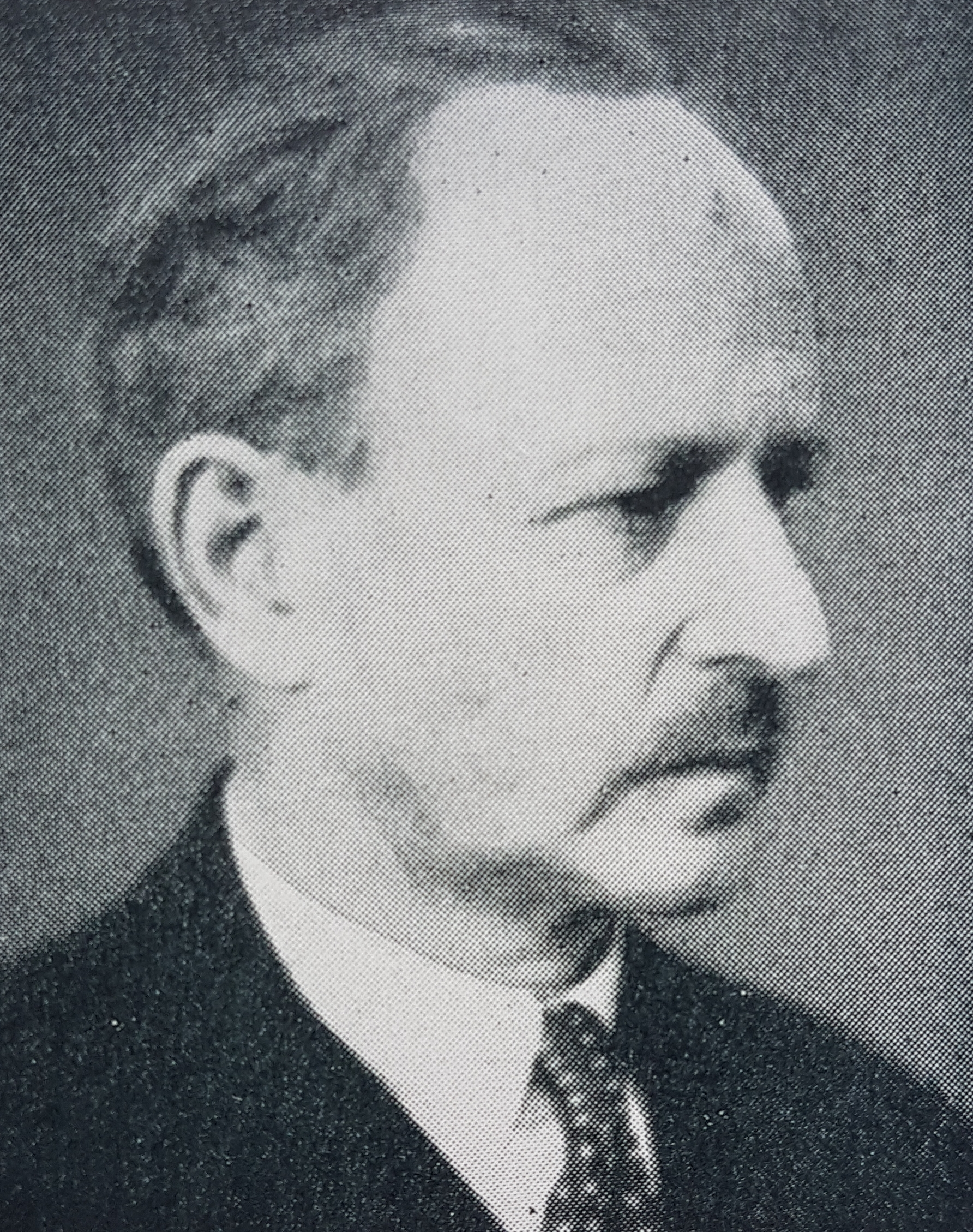
Oscar Falkman, early investor and first CEO of Boliden AB

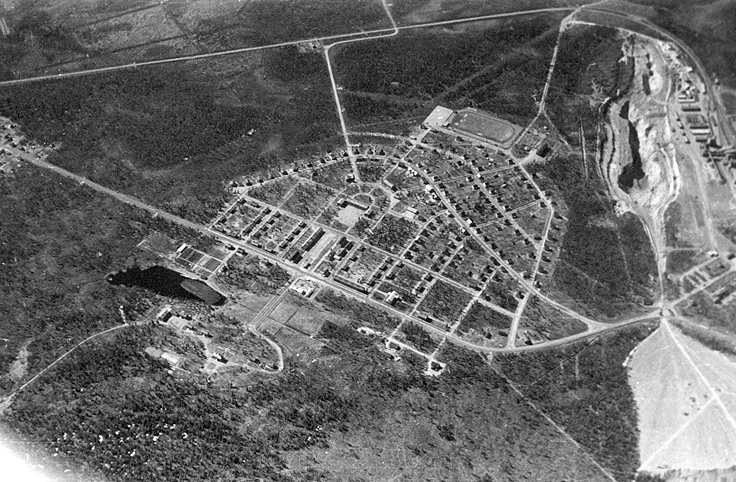
The Boliden mine (right) and adjoining town (left) in 1939

In 1918, a mining company called Centralgruppens Emissionsbolag, which was majority-owned by Skaninaviska Banken, began prospecting in the area surrounding Skellefteå. In 1924, a gold ore deposit was discovered near the village of Bjurliden, around 30 km from Skellefteå. It was found to contain 18 grams of gold per ton, making it Europe's richest ore at the time. It also contained significant amounts of silver and copper.

In the mid-1920s, the company went bankrupt. Its main shareholder Skaninaviska Banken liquidated and restructured it into two separate companies, retaining majority ownership of both: Skellefteå gruv AB and Västerbottens gruv AB. Oscar Falkman, a venture capitalist who had led Emissionsbolag's prospecting operations since 1918, became the leader of both companies. Financier Ivar Kreuger bought majority shares in both companies in 1929 for 58 million SEK (2 billion SEK today, or 183 million EUR) and two years later consolidated them into one, which became the modern entity Boliden. Falkman became its first CEO, ultimately serving for 12 years.

=== 1930s–1940s: restructuring and expansion ===
In 1932, Kreuger, who was heavily indebted and facing bankruptcy, died of suicide. The Swedish government passed a law limiting foreign ownership of Swedish companies active in resource extraction. The law, dubbed Lex Boliden by the press, remained on the books until the 1990s. Ultimately, Kreuger's stake in Boliden passed back to Skandinaviska Banken, which had provided most of the money for his purchase of the mine. The bank remained the owners of the company until 1952, when the company shares were publicly listed.

Over the next few years, the town of Boliden grew quickly around the mine.

==== Smelting operations ====
In 1930, Boliden commissioned a smelter in the coastal town of Skelleftehamn to process the Boliden ore. The site saw significant expansion in the rest of the 20th century and is today part of the company's Rönnskär factory. In the 1940s, Boliden began producing purified lead, silver and arsenic there. In 1952, the company began to produce sulphuric acid from its own sulphur dioxide emissions. In 1970, a dedicated refinery was built to concentrate and purify the sulphur dioxide to increase the recovery rate. Boliden had a near-monopoly on sulphuric acid in Sweden at that time.

==== Diversification beyond gold ====
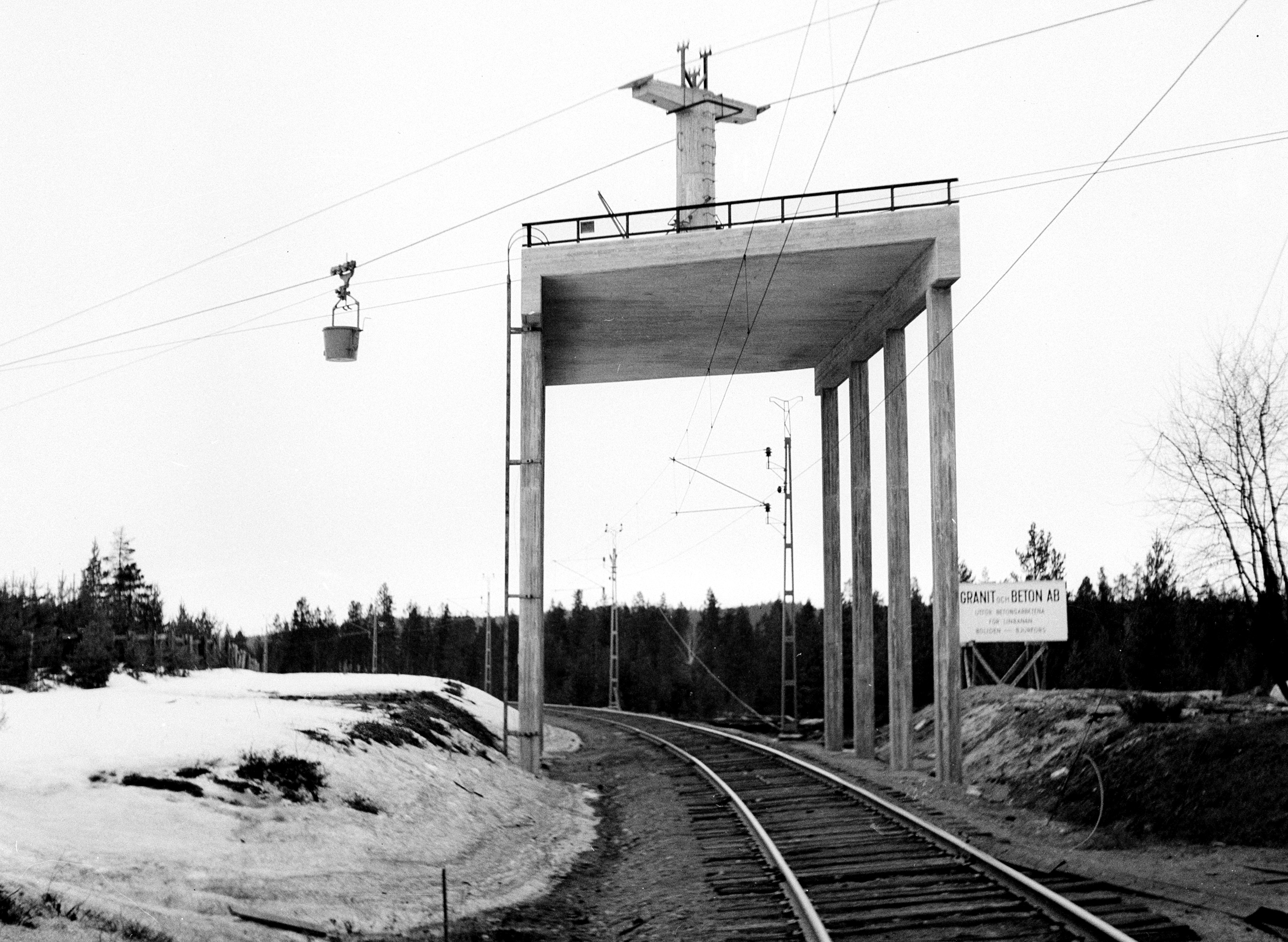
Aerial tramway between Kristineberg and Boliden (1943)

Responding to demand created by the war economies of World War II, Boliden began investing in the extraction and processing of copper, as well as some lead and nickel. The company commissioned the Laver copper mine in 1936, which was only operational for ten years. The following year, Boliden also bought a significant amount of land near Kristineberg from local prospector and miner Johan Alfred Hultdin for 50,000 SEK (1.9 million SEK today, or 170,000 EUR). The company quickly developed the site and commissioned mining operations in 1940. In 1943, the company began operating a 96-kilometre aerial tramway between Kristineberg and Boliden for the transportation of ore. In 1943, Boliden opened a lead mine in Laisvall that was active until 2001.

=== 1950s–1980: zinc and lead ===
Boliden began expanding its lead production and also investing in zinc, which together made up the majority of the company's metal output by the 1960s. In 1957, Boliden acquired the company Zinkgruvor AB, taking over its mines in the Bergslagen region, including a zinc and silver mine at Garpenberg and Långfallsgruvan, a zinc mine near Saxberget. Boliden opened the Aitik mine, an open pit mine copper mine, near Gällivare in 1968. The company also continued producing gold, as well as silver, arsenic, selenium, nickel sulphate, zinc, and sulphuric acid.

In the 1960s, Boliden began to develop processes to refine complex metal mixtures, critical for recycling industrial scrap. The company was one of the key developers of the Kaldo furnace to treat lead-containing copper.

In 1967, the original Boliden mine was closed down.

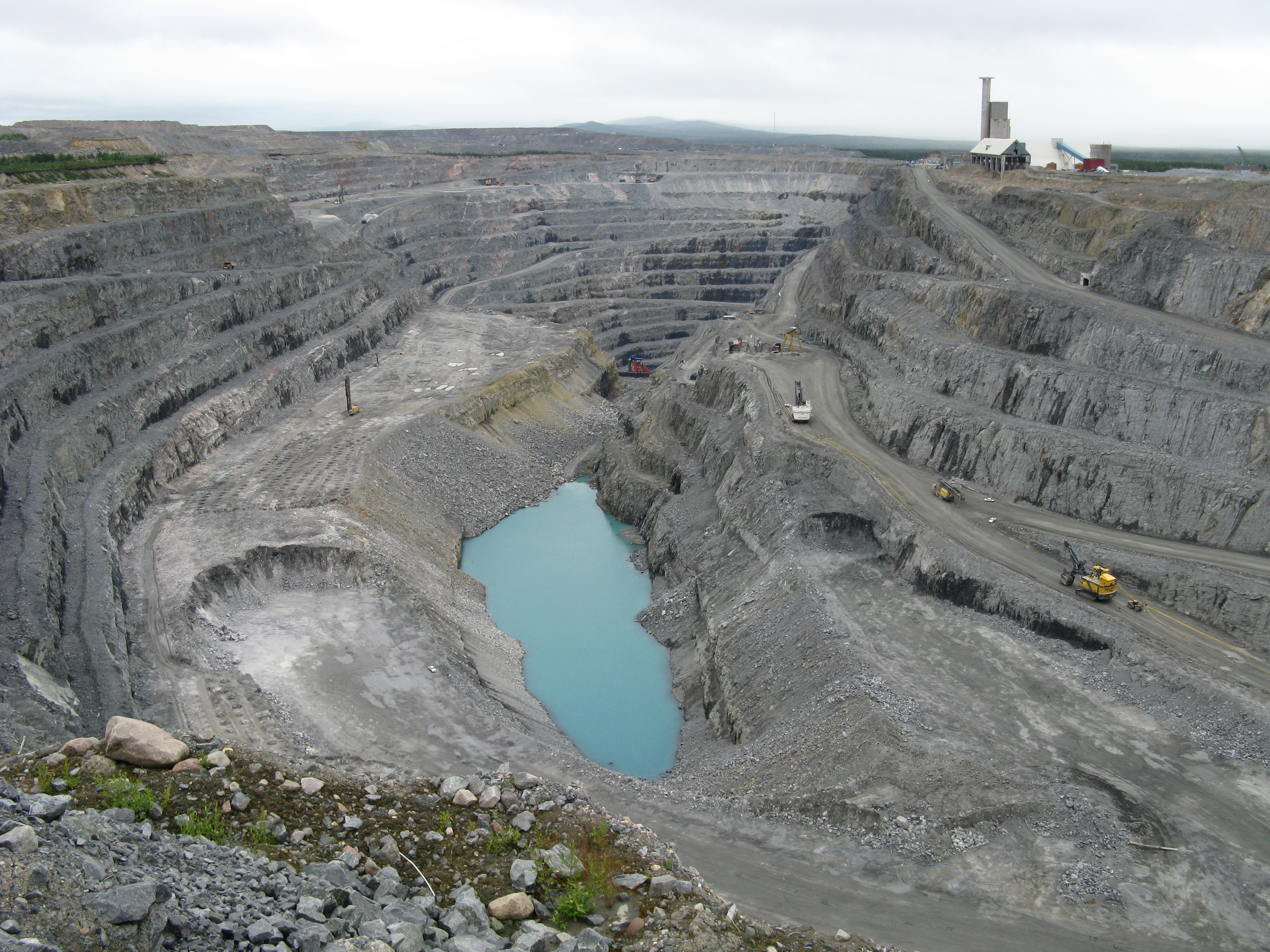
Boliden opened the Aitik copper mine in 1968.

In 1973, Boliden acquired half of the lead mining operations of the German company Preussag (today TUI Group). Boliden aimed to expand its lead smelting and refining capacity, as well as facilitate the sale of its lead products. The deal also marked Boliden's first major entry into markets outside of Sweden. In 1976, Boliden launched a Kaldo type furnace, for processing metals. 1976 also saw Boliden launch the first flash smelting furnace for lead, applying Kaldo technology, at Rönnskär.

In 1979, Boliden acquired Paul Bergsöe & Son, a Danish smelting company with operations in Landskrona, which is today primarily a lead-acid battery recycler.

=== 1980–1986: diversification and acquisition by Trelleborg ===
By 1980, Boliden was producing around 11 million tonnes of ore per year from 16 mines in central and northern Sweden. Almost all of it was refined at the Rönnskär (Sweden) and Odda (Norway). Seeking to diversify its operations, the company expanded aggressively over five years, investing in downstream activities like gallium arsenide production and construction materials. It also set up its own materials trading division and, in 1986, purchased the appliance wholesaler Ahlsell for 1 billion SEK (2.7 billion SEK, or 244 million EUR, in 2025). The acquisition made Boliden one of Sweden's largest companies, with over 15,000 employees.

However, by 1985, low international metal prices had severely cut into the company's profits, depressing its share price to the point that it became a target for a takeover. In 1986, the polymer manufacturer Trelleborg acquired a controlling interest in Boliden.

=== 1987–1995: streamlining and international expansion ===
Trelleborg was the majority shareholder of Boliden from 1986 to 1996.

Trelleborg, Boliden's majority shareholder from 1986 to 1996, initiated a major restructuring of the Boliden Group to refocus the company on its core strengths: mining, mineral refining, and chemicals. A number of unrelated or loss-making subsidiaries totaling over 6,000 employees were sold off, including large parts of the recently purchased Ahlsell, several electronics and household appliance companies, a number of trading companies, and a healthcare provider. The money raised through these divestments were reinvested to expand Boliden's mining operations. In particular, Trelleborg aimed to expand Boliden's international footprint, believing that Sweden had become less competitive as a manufacturing location due to high taxes, stricter environmental laws, and Sweden's lack of membership in the European Economic Community (a single market that later grew into the European Union).

The company began acquiring mines outside of Sweden. It opened a Toronto office in 1988. One of the first major international acquisitions was Boliden's purchase of the near-bankrupt zinc and lead mine Maamorilik in Greenland from Cominco in 1986. The subsequent discovery of further exploitable mineral deposits, combined with the recovery of metals prices in the late 1980s, allowed Boliden to extend the life of the mine by several years at a significant profit. In the same year, Boliden acquired the Spanish company Apirsa, which extracted zinc and lead from the Aznalcóllar open pit mine, 45 km west of Seville. The company also redoubled its efforts to finish construction of the Sukhaybarat gold mine in Saudi Arabia, which it had partially acquired several years earlier and was developing as a joint venture with Petromin. The mine was finally commissioned in 1991.

In 1992, Boliden opened the Petiknäs zinc mine in northern Sweden after several years of exploration; it was connected to the nearby Rönström zinc/gold mine via a 2.5 km underground passage in 1996.

Some acquisitions proved short-lived. In 1990, Boliden entered a joint venture with Burkina Faso's mining ministry to develop the Perkoa zinc mine, but withdrew just two years later following a global collapse in zinc prices. Similarly, it exited a joint venture to develop the Santa Rosa gold mine in Cañazas, Panama in 1993.

=== 1996–2001: financial troubles ===
Boliden Ltd's share price collapsed soon after listing in Canada, particularly due to the Doñana disaster and low metal prices.

==== Trelleborg divests Boliden ====
By 1996, Boliden was incurring steep losses, moving Trelleborg to divest Boliden again. Boliden was restructured as Boliden Limited and reincorporated in Toronto. Trelleborg sold 55% of its shares in Boliden in on the Toronto Stock Exchange for US$632 million (1.15 billion today). In 1999, Trelleborg began selling off its remaining 45% stake on the Stockholm Stock exchange; by 2001 its stake had been reduced to 8%. Boliden's debts at this time amounted to 8 billion SEK (12 billion SEK today, or 1.1 billion EUR).

==== Ill-fated acquisition of Westmin ====
In 1997, Boliden Ltd. bought the Canadian company Westmin for US$540 million (US$1.07 billion today). Although the acquisition initially appeared a success, with Boliden doubling its profits that year, it quickly became viewed as a disaster. One Canadian newspaper remarked that it had "paid top dollar for a handful of problem mines". Falling metals prices worsened the situation. By the end of 1998, Boliden was already forced to close one of the acquired mines, the Gibraltar copper mine in Canada, and write off its 51% stake in the unfinished Vizcachitas copper project in Chile. In 1999, it sold the closed Gibraltar mine to Taseko for US$20 million and its 50% stake in the Saudi Sukhaybarat gold mine, which it had been co-operating for 8 years, for US$6.9 million. In 2004, Boliden sold what remained of its Westmin assets to Breakwater Resources for US$5.7 million in company shares.

==== Doñana disaster ====
On 25 April 1998, the tailings dam at Apirsa's Los Frailes mine burst and 4.5 million cubic metres of tailings sand drained out into the nearby Guadiamar river, near Doñana National Park, causing Spain's worst environmental disaster in modern history. The dam's failure was attributed to gradual deterioration of its marl foundation in contact with the acidic contents of the dam. Although the company claimed force majeure, critics noted that issues with the foundation had been identified two years previously. The company closed the mine permanently and began reclamation work. The financial cost of the disaster wiped out Boliden's profits. As a result, its share price also dropped sharply. Although the company was cleared of criminal responsibility in 2001, the Spanish government fined Boliden's Spanish subsidiary, which had already gone bankrupt, €45 million (€73.6 million today) in 2002. Boliden unsuccessfully sued several of the construction companies that had built the dam. The remediation costs of Aznalcóllar ended up costing €240 million (€377 million today).

=== 2001–present: re-focusing on Europe ===
In 2001, Boliden was redomiciled in Sweden as Boliden AB. The company began pivoting back to its European roots. In 2000, it invested US$245 million in an expansion of Rönnskär, its biggest smelting plant, which had been a reliable source of revenue throughout the difficult 1990s. The expansion, consisting of more energy-efficient flash furnaces, was expected to pay for itself within 7 years. New exploration and development efforts followed in northern Sweden, including the Maurliden zinc mine (opened in 2001) and the Storliden copper/zinc mine (opened in 2002). In 2004, Boliden sold Storliden to Lundin Mining for 123 million SEK (178 million SEK today, or 16 million EUR).

In 2003, Boliden further narrowed its focus on mining and refining by swapping its advanced manufacturing and sales units for Outokumpu's mining and smelting assets. The deal included the Tara zinc mine in Ireland; zinc smelters in Kokkola (Finland) and Odda (Norway); and copper smelting and refining operations in Harjavalta and Pori (Finland). In exchange, Outokumpu acquired Boliden's brass and other downstream units. To partially fund the transaction, Boliden issued new shares, resulting in Outokumpu owning 49% of the company. Outokumpu gradually sold off its stake over the next three years.

In 2006, Boliden approved a $790 million ($1.1 billion today) expansion of its Aitik copper mine, which was completed in 2010. That same year, OM Group signed a 3-year contract for Boliden to refine 240,000 tons of nickel concentrate annually at its Harjavalta smelter. Successful exploration resulted in increases to Garpenberg's ore reserves. A new lead section was also opened at Bergsöe.

In 2016, Boliden purchased the Kevitsa mine in Finland for for US$712 million.

In 2016, Boliden was ranked as being among the 13th best of 92 oil, gas, and mining companies on indigenous rights in the Arctic.

In April 2025, Boliden acquired Somnicor, owner of the Neves-Corvo mine, and Zinkgruvan mine from Lundin Mining for US$1.4 billion plus up to an additional US$150 million in contingency payments.

== Waste dumping disaster in Chile ==
In the mid-1980s, allegedly to circumvent stricter environmental laws in Sweden, Boliden offloaded around 19,000 tonnes of waste to Promel, a Chilean company, for processing. Boliden paid 10 million SEK for Promel to take on the waste. The waste had been stored in Boliden's Rönnskär smelter for several decades and contained high concentrations of hazardous elements, including arsenic, mercury, cadmium and lead. Promel claimed to want to extract and sell the gold contained in the waste, but never ended up doing so. The waste was, instead, stored on the outskirts of the city of Arica, at a site which was converted to a low-cost residential area in the 1990s on the instructions of the social services. The original export documents had claimed that the metallic residues were 'non-toxic' and residents were unaware of the waste's presence or potential for harm. However, in the late 1990s and early 2000s, reports began emerging of people suffering from symptoms consistent with arsenic poisoning. By 2008, 12,000 people were believed to be affected. In 2009, the Chilean government evacuated around 7,000 residents of the area. The waste was exported before the Basel Convention prohibiting the export of environmentally hazardous waste came into force.

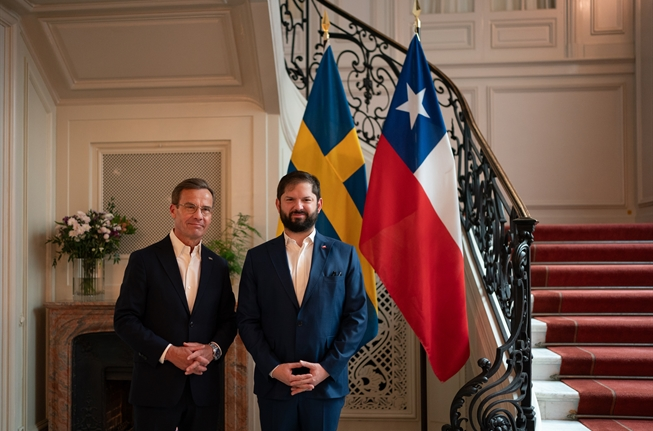
At a meeting in 2024, Chilean president Gabriel Boric and Swedish prime minister Ulf Kristersson committed to cleaning up the mining waste Boliden had sold to a Chilean company in 1985.

In 2013, 700 Chilean victims of arsenic poisoning filed a lawsuit against Boliden. The plaintiffs lost the case in the Skellefteå district court in 2019. Their appeal to the appeals court was also rejected the following year; the court found that the statute of limitations of 10 years had run out. In 2024, during a state visit to Sweden, Chilean president Gabriel Boric discussed the issue with Swedish prime minister Ulf Kristersson. The pair signed a letter of intent promising to cooperate on the removal of mining waste.

The decades-long disaster led to widespread criticism of Boliden and Sweden. Boliden was criticized for its intransigence in dealing with the victims. The Swedish state was also accused of showing excessive deference to the company and not following its own laws on the export of hazardous waste. The journalist Marcos Orellana, serving as a United Nations special rapporteur, investigated the case and wrote that he "could not imagine" he would be writing about Sweden when he accepted his job. He deplored Boliden's tactics of casting doubt on the validity of the arsenic poisoning cases and urged both Boliden and the Swedish government to finally acknowledge their role in the disaster, "remedy the damage caused to the population of Arica", and arrange for the waste to be stored in Boliden's purpose-built repository at its Rönnskärsverken site in Sweden.

== Human rights record ==
In September 2020, Boliden lawyers sued lawyers Johan Öberg and Göran Starkebo, who were representing the alleged Chilean victims of arsenic poisoning from Boliden's waste dumping scandal in the 1980s. Boliden attempted to make them personally liable for costs incurred by Boliden in defending the case. It was considered by Annalisa Ciampi, who was serving as a UN special rapporteur, to be an intimidation lawsuit.

== Environmental record ==
One of Boliden's mines, the Los Frailes mine near Sevilla, was the site of one of Spain's worst environmental disasters in modern history in 1998.

In 2017, Boliden was rated the world's second most climate-friendly mining firm with regards to carbon dioxide.

In August 2021, Boliden was one of several major mining companies to join Komatsu to advance zero-emission mining.

In August 2021, Boliden ranked second among mining companies in Bloomberg Intelligence's low-carbon ranking.

In 2021, Boliden was ranked no. 18 out of 120 oil, gas, and mining companies involved in resource extraction north of the Arctic Circle in the Arctic Environmental Responsibility Index (AERI).

Boliden reported Total CO2e emissions (Direct + Indirect) for 31 December 2020 at 897 Kt (-20 /-2.2% y-o-y). There has been a consistent declining trend in reported emissions since 2016.

Boliden's Total CO2e emissions (Direct + Indirect) (in kilotonnes)
| Dec 2014 | Dec 2015 | Dec 2016 | Dec 2017 | Dec 2018 | Dec 2019 | Dec 2020 |
|---|---|---|---|---|---|---|
| 1,001 | 889 | 1,053 | 1,023 | 971 | 917 | 897 |

== In media and popular culture ==
The Aitik copper mine (a major mine within the company) was featured on a 2007 episode of the Discovery Channel series Really Big Things.

Released in 2014, Swedish director Roy Andersson's film A Pigeon Sat on a Branch Reflecting on Existence includes a controversial scene which, according to the director, refers to Boliden's involvement in dumping dangerous toxins in the Chilean city Arica in the 1980s. In a review of the film, film critic Jessica Kiang describes the scene: "And in probably the most unsettling and memorable scene, which plays out like a live action Monty Python animation, colonial-era British soldiers pack a huge brass drum outfitted with trumpet horns of varying sizes with chained black slaves. The door is closed, and a fire is lit beneath the drum, which begins to revolve slowly (it is emblazoned with the name of Swedish mining giant Boliden) and to emit a kind of music. All this, it is revealed, is being enacted for the entertainment of a group of elderly rich, champagne-sipping white people in evening wear."

The smelting victims in Arica is also the topic of Toxic Playground, a Swedish documentary by William Johansson and Lars Edman released in 2009.

In 2021, the topical satirical show Svenska Nyheter (Swedish News) included a 12 minute segment about the ARICA case, with a resident of Arica gathering a sample of contaminated soil, putting it in an envelope and mailing it back to Boliden.

== See also ==
- List of Swedish companies
- Doñana disaster, caused by negligence on the part of Boliden-Apirsa.
