= United Nations Special Rapporteur on Toxics and Human Rights =

United Nations Special Rapporteur

- Emblem of the United Nations
- Incumbent; Bethanie Carney Almroth since August 2026
- Website: Special Rapporteur on toxics and human rights

The mandate of the United Nations Special Rapporteur on Toxics and Human Rights was established in 1995 by the United Nations Commission on Human Rights.

== Background ==
In 1995, the United Nations Commission on Human Rights established the mandate to examine the human rights implications of exposure to hazardous substances and toxic waste. This included the implications of trends like illicit traffic and release of toxic and dangerous products during military activities, war and conflict, shipbreaking. Other areas included in the mandate are medical waste, extractive industries (particularly oil, gas and mining), labour conditions in manufacturing and agricultural sectors, consumer products, environmental emissions of hazardous substances from all sources, and the disposal of waste.

In 2011, the UN Human Rights Council affirmed that hazardous substances and waste may constitute a serious threat to the full enjoyment of human rights. It expanded the mandate to include the whole life-cycle of hazardous products, from manufacturing to final disposal. This is known as the cradle-to-grave approach. The rapid acceleration in chemical production suggests the likelihood that this is an increasing threat, particularly for the human rights of the most vulnerable segments of society.

The UN asserts that states are required by international human rights law to take active measures to prevent the exposure of individuals and communities to toxic substances. Vulnerable members of society are often deemed most affected. They include people living in poverty, workers, children, minority groups, indigenous peoples, migrants, among other vulnerable or susceptible groups, with highly gendered impacts.

== Independent expert ==
The Special Rapporteur is appointed by the UN Human Rights Council. The appointed expert is required by the Human Rights Council to examine and report back to member States on initiatives taken to promote and protect the human rights implicated by the improper management of hazardous substances and wastes.

=== Selection of topics reported on by the Special Rapporteur ===
- In March 2022, Human Rights Watch made a submission to the report of the Special Rapporteur regarding mercury, artisanal and small-scale gold mining. Mercury is used in mining to retrieve the gold from the ore. Mercury, which is particularly harmful to children, attacks the central nervous system and can cause brain damage and death. The mining work is often carried out by child labourers who have little or false information about the risks of mercury.
- 2021 – Report: The stages of the plastics cycle and their impacts on human rights

The report highlights the human rights implications of toxic additives in plastics and the life cycle stages of plastic, including the rights of women, children, workers, and indigenous peoples. Toxic chemicals are commonly added to plastics, causing serious risks to human rights and the environment. The Special Rapporteur puts forward recommendations aimed at addressing the negative consequences of plastics on human rights.

- 2015 – Report: Right to Information on Hazardous Substances and Wastes

In this report, the Special Rapporteur clarifies the scope of the right to information throughout the life cycle of hazardous substances and wastes, identifies challenges that have emerged in realizing this right and outlines potential solutions to these problems. Obligations of States and responsibilities of business in relation to implementing the right to information on hazardous substances and wastes are discussed.

=== Current Independent Expert ===
- Bethanie Carney Almroth, since 2026

=== Past Independent Experts ===
- Marcos A. Orellana (Chile), 2020–2026
- Başkut Tunçak (Turkey/US), 2014–2020
- Marc Pallemaerts (Belgium), 2012–2014
- Călin Georgescu (Romania), 2010–2012
- Okechukwu Ibeanu (Nigeria), 2004–2010
- Fatma Zohra Ouhachi-Vesely (Algeria), 1995–2004
