= Frans Anatolius Sjöström =

Finnish architect (1840–1885)

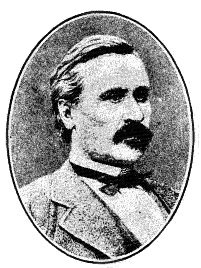
Portrait of Frans Sjöström, from the Nordisk familjebok

Frans Anatolius Sjöström (3 July 1840 – 1 August 1885) was a Finland Swedish architect. He was born in Turku and educated there and, in 1868, at the Royal Swedish Academy of Arts. In 1872 he designed the old building of the Helsinki University of Technology. He died in Rönnskär.
