= Kaldo =

Kaldo may refer to:

- Kaldo Kalm, Estonian ice sledge hockey player.
- Chaldea, Aramaic transliteration of ܟܠܕܘ, Kaldo
- Hiligaynon language term for 'broth'
- Kaldo converter, a rotary oxygen based steelmaking process
