= Aitik =

Copper mine in Sweden

Coordinates: 67°4′N 20°57′E

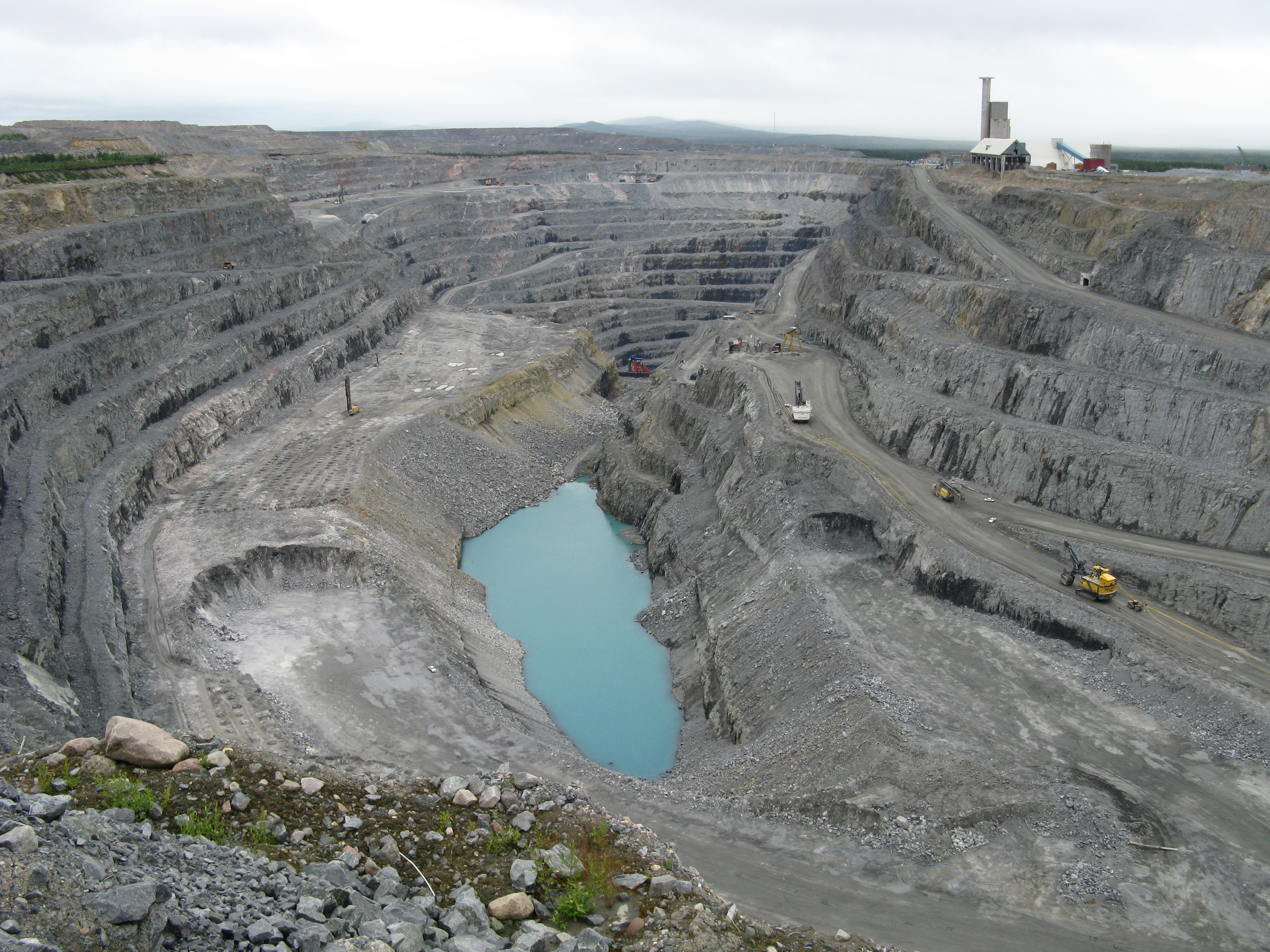
The open pit copper mine of Aitik

The Aitik copper mine is owned by Boliden AB and situated outside the town of Gällivare in northern Sweden. It is one of Europe's largest open pit copper mines. Alongside copper, some quantities of gold and silver are produced alongside the main production.

The mine was put into production in 1968, and the production was set at two million tonnes of ore. Since then, the production has gradually increased to the current 18 million tonnes per year. In 2010 when the new Aitik mine expansion is completed production will double to 36 million tonnes.

In 2014 it was expected that production reach 36 million tons of ore, but this was surpassed by over 3 million tons at year's end.
