= Doñana disaster =

Dam failure releasing toxic mine tailings in Andalusia, southern Spain

- Native name: Desastre de Aznalcóllar
- English name: Aznalcóllar disaster
- Date: 25 April 1998
- Time: 03:30 (CEST)
- Location: Aznalcóllar, Seville, Spain; 37.492603°N 6.225202°W,
- Type: Environmental disaster
- Cause: Embankment failure
- Outcome: Toxic spill
- Casualties: 170 kg (370 lb) of crayfish and 37.4 t (36.8 long tons; 41.2 short tons) of fish
- Arrests: Several, including public employees

The Doñana Disaster, also known as the Aznalcollar Disaster or Guadiamar Disaster (Spanish: Desastre de Aznalcóllar, Desastre del Guadiamar), was an industrial accident in Andalusia, southern Spain. On 25 April 1998, a holding dam burst at the Los Frailes mine, near Aznalcóllar, Seville, releasing 4–5 million cubic metres (3,200–4,100 acre⋅ft) of mine tailings. The acidic tailings, which contained dangerous levels of several heavy metals, quickly reached the nearby River Agrio, and then its parent river, the River Guadiamar, travelling about 40 kilometres (25 mi) along these waterways and covering an area of 4,600 hectares (11,000 acres) before they could be stopped. The Guadiamar is the main water source for the Doñana National Park, a UNESCO World Heritage Site and one of the largest national parks in Europe. The cleanup operation took three years, at an estimated cost of €240 million.

The Los Frailes mine is owned by Boliden-Apirsa (formerly Andaluza de Piritas, S.A.), the Spanish subsidiary of Boliden, and produces about 125,000 t (123,000 long tons; 138,000 short tons) of zinc and 2.9 million troy ounces (200,000 lb; 90,000 kg) of silver per year.

== History ==
The park is one of Europe’s best known conservation areas and has been designated a UNESCO biosphere reserve, a Ramsar Wetland Site, and a UNESCO World Heritage site. The park’s past includes a well-chronicled human history stretching back 700 years. In its first year of operation in 1997, Boliden produced 180,000 tonnes (180,000 long tons; 200,000 short tons) of zinc, lead, copper and silver from 4 million tonnes (3,900,000 long tons; 4,400,000 short tons) of ore.

== National Park ==
Doñana National Park, just east of Portugal, is located between two provinces of Andalucia, Seville and Huelva. It is notable for the great diversity of its biotopes, especially lagoons, marshlands, fixed and mobile dunes, scrub woodland and maquis. As one of the continent's biggest natural reserves, Doñana is also host of a large variety of bird species. Because of its location and close proximity between Africa and Europe, more than half a million birds winter in the park each year, and perhaps half of Europe’s bird species can be spotted here at one time or another.

== Environmental effects ==
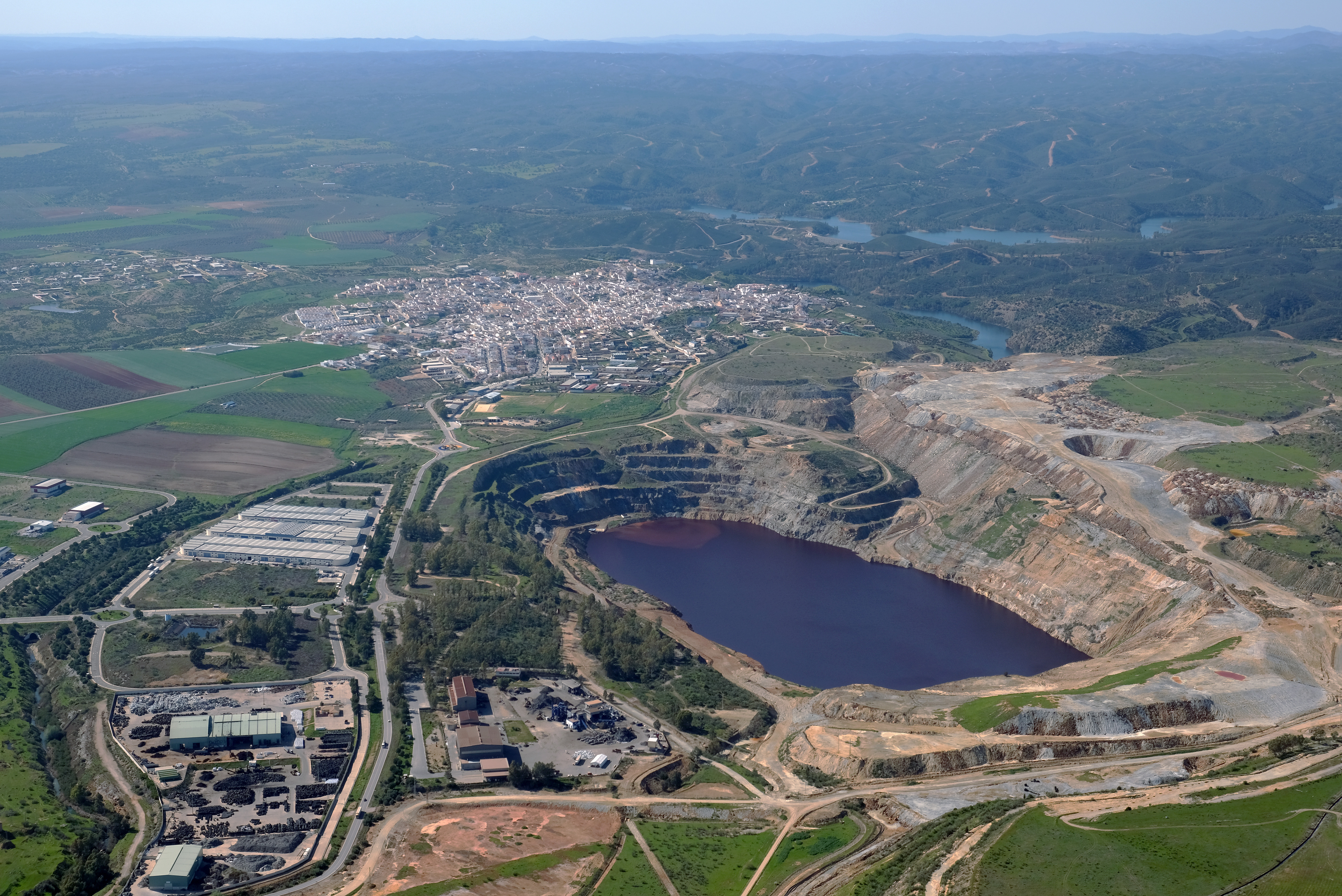
Aznalcóllar mine.

As a result of the ecological disaster, nothing survived because of the high acidity of the waste, which contained a mixture of lead, copper, zinc, cadmium and other metals, along with sulphides, The industrial disaster led to a chain of serious environmental issues in the Andalusia region. A not very visible toxic chain spread through the nature which was difficult to break down. High levels of heavy metals are still embedded in soil and water and have found a way into the wildlife. Another major problem lies in the health of the animals that lived around the park. In this mixture of swamps and woodlands, 300 species of birds breed, feed or stop over on their migratory route between Northern Europe and Africa. This migration soon came to an end when the dam burst; almost 2,000 birds, chicks, eggs, and nests were killed or destroyed and 37,400 kg (82,500 lb) of dead fish (mainly carps, mullets, Andalusian barbels, and eels) were collected in the aftermath.

== Economic consequences ==
Boliden-Apirsa, who own the mine, has spent more than US$52 million cleaning up, repairing damage and reimbursing farmers for lost crops. Most of the cleaning that was done by the clean up crews was dumped into a large ditch that was empty. As a result, most of the area that was affected is now new and clean. This was the country's worst environmental disaster. The cleanup cost as of 2002 was reported to be €276M. In 2014, The Guardian reported that Spain had decided to further spend €360M on restoring the landscape.

== Projects ==
Although the Doñana Disaster turned out to be one of the worst catastrophes in Europe, there have been speculations about reopening the long gone mine. One reason for opposition is that the area is home to thousands of birds that migrate from different continents. The main reason for reopening the mine is an economic one; that there is still profitable ore there, and reopening the mine could provide 1,000 jobs. The process might not be as easy to accomplish as some suggest, reopening the mine could lead to another burst. Nonetheless, the secretary-general for Innovation, Industry and Energy of Andalucía, Vicente Fernández Guerrero, explained that the mine license would stipulate that only modern mining techniques would be allowed. It also stipulated that Boliden-Apirsa could not bid for the contract. Twenty six years after the accident the two sides remain locked over compensation claims Fernández Guerrero also included that no liquid could be used under the exercise of the best technology in the world, which would avoid the creation of poisonous wet tailings.

== See also ==
- Baia Mare cyanide spill (2000)
- Health crisis
- Val di Stava dam collapse (1985)
- Ajka alumina plant accident (2010)
