= Rönnskär =

Swedish metallurgic factory

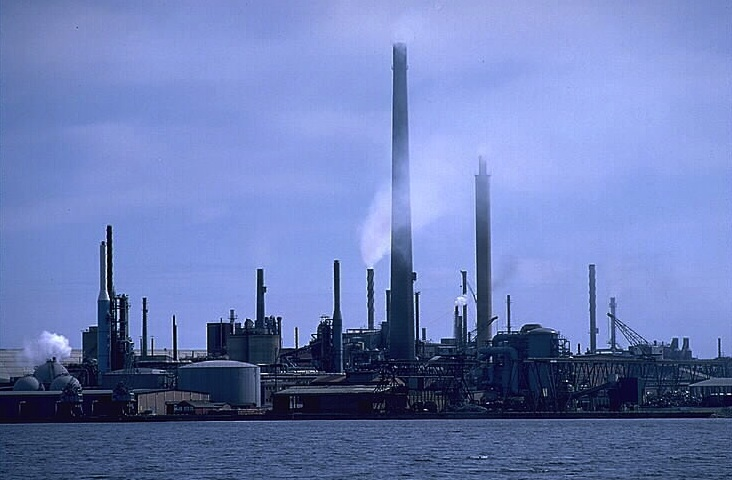
- Industry: Metallurgy
- Founded: 1930
- Headquarters: Sweden
- Owner: Boliden AB
- Number of employees: 865 (2021)

Rönnskär (Boliden Rönnskär) is a metallurgic plant located in Skelleftehamn, Sweden. The factory does extraction of copper, zinc and lead, and produces important quantities of sulfuric acid, silver and gold when extracted as joint products. Since 2012, electronic waste recycling has become a major activity of the factory. Launched in 1930 as Rönnskärsverken, Rönnskär is Boliden AB's main production site.

== History ==
Gold discovered around Boliden in 1925 and important mineral deposits in Skellefteå accelerated the region's industrial growth. Minerals in Boliden contained high levels of arsenic, so in 1927 it became a priority for the country to develop its own extraction capacities of its own minerals.

The main production site was created by unifying the Hamnskär and Rönnskär islands, and joining them to the main land. Construction of the factory, with its 128-meter chimney, started in 1928. The foundry started operations in January 1930. Production was essentially focused on pure copper ingots. The extraction factory of precious metals was constructed once gold and silver were found in high quantities in the extracted copper.

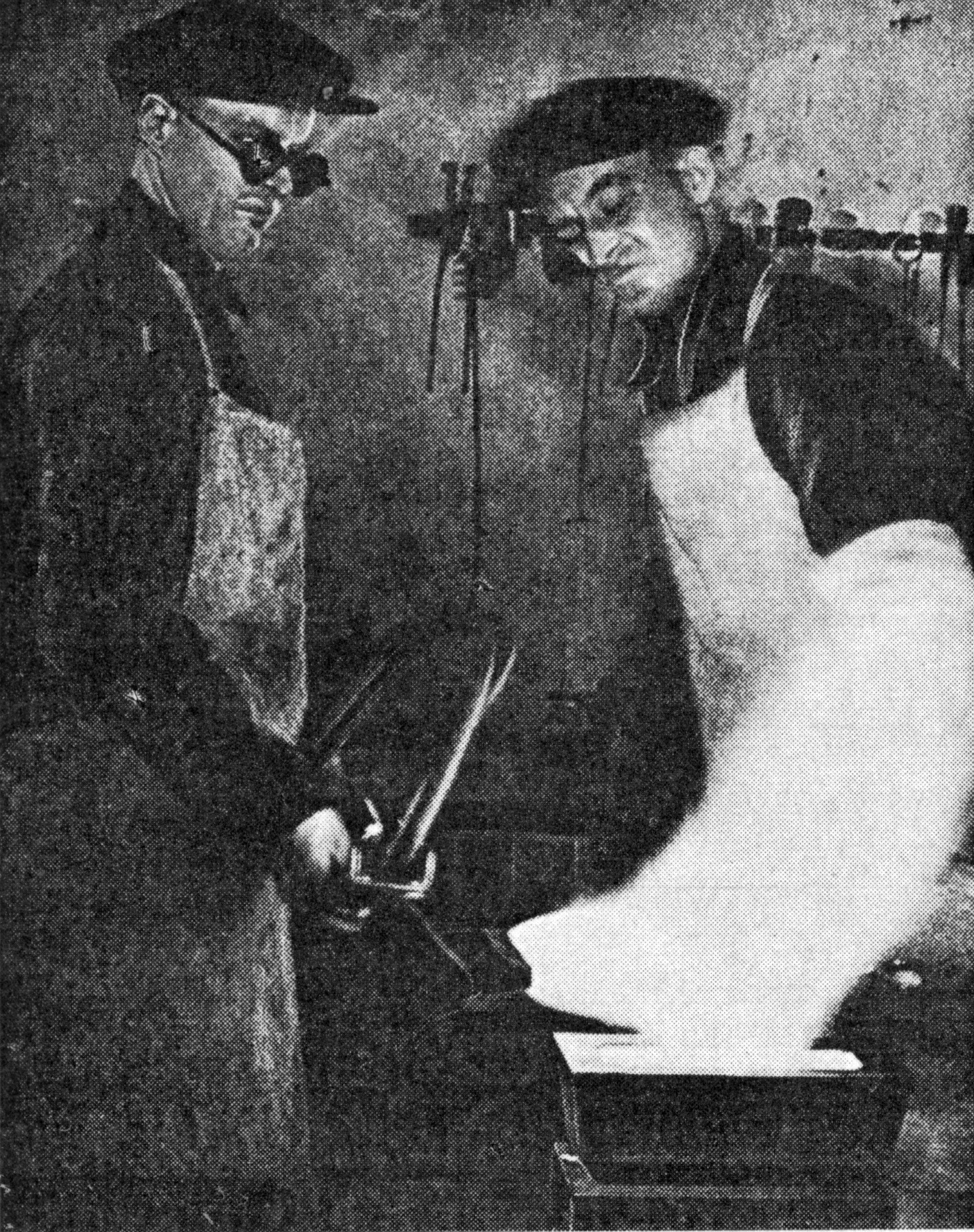
Making of a gold ingot, 1935.

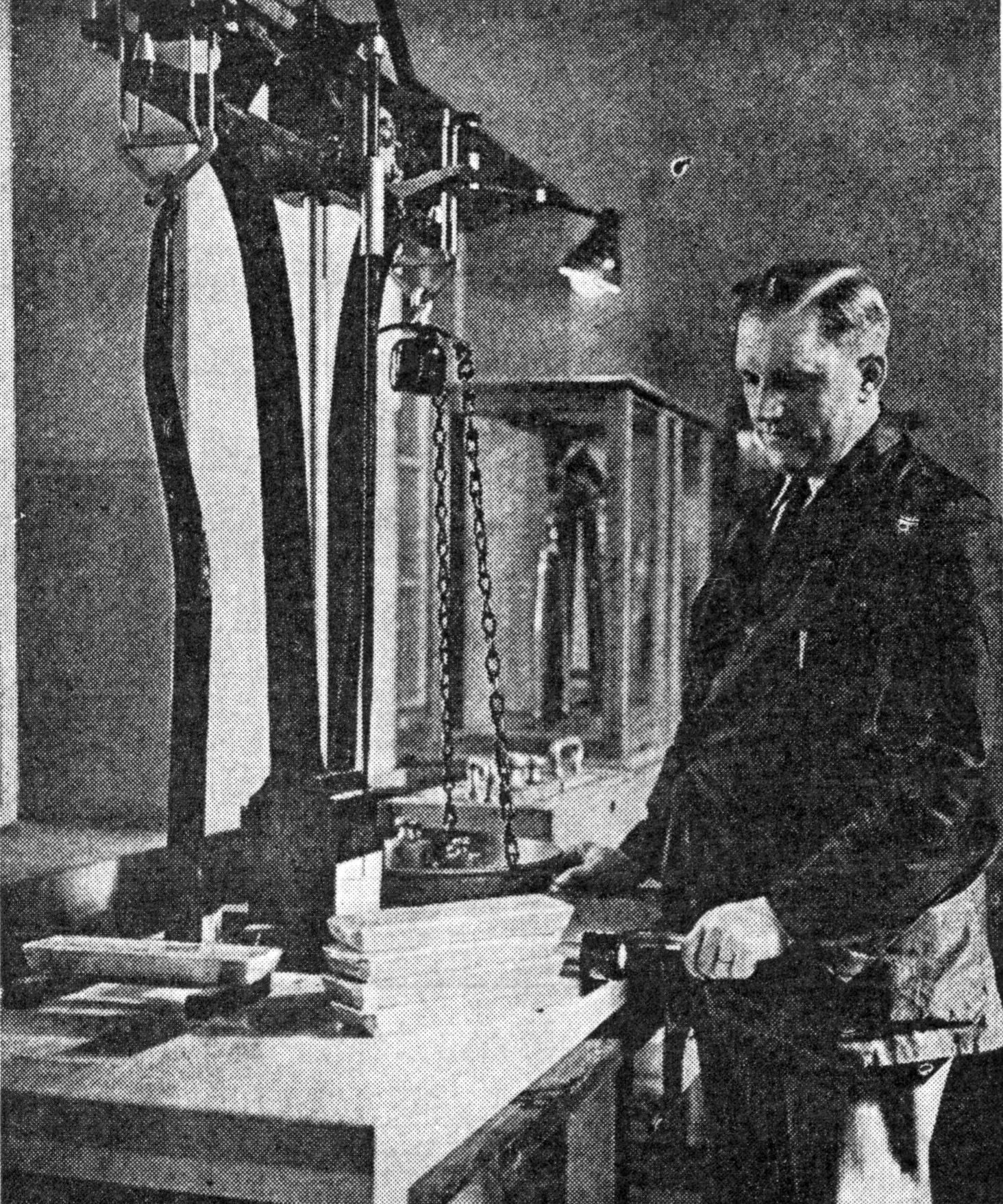
Weighing gold ingots, 1935.

During the 1930s, reverberatory furnaces, converting smelters and electrolysis installations were added to the complex. The sulfuric acid factory was built in 1942. Zinc recycling activities were developed during the 1960s. In 1976, Rönnskär inaugurated the world's first Kaldo converter built for lead extraction. Recycling of metals from electronic waste started in the 1980s. From 1998 to 2000, the capacity of the factory's copper smelter and refinery was doubled to reach a production volume of 230K t/y. In 2012, Boliden launched an expansion program of its electronic scrap recycling to triple its capacity to 120,000 mt/y.

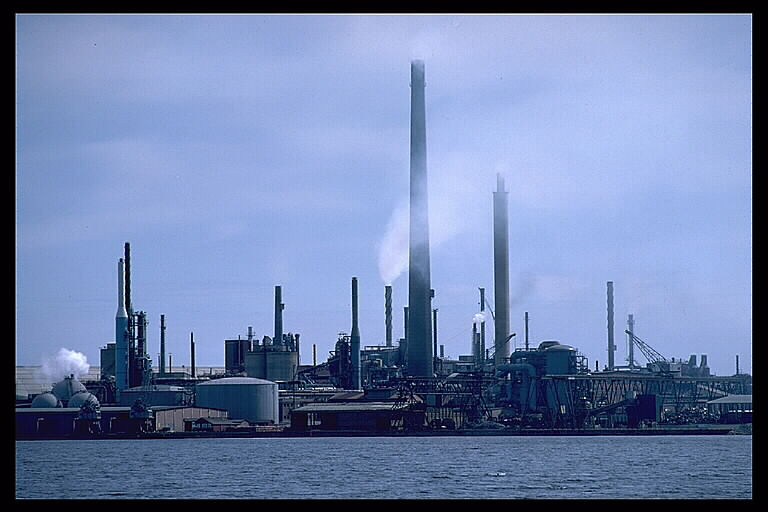
Probably 1970s.

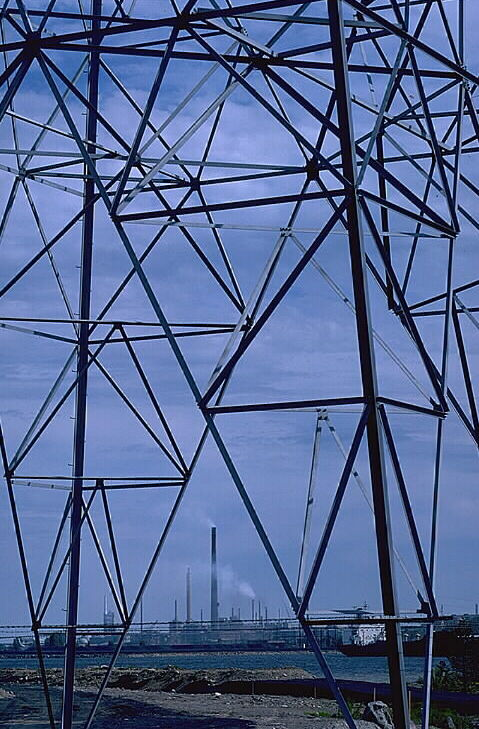
Smelter (background), power line pole (foreground).

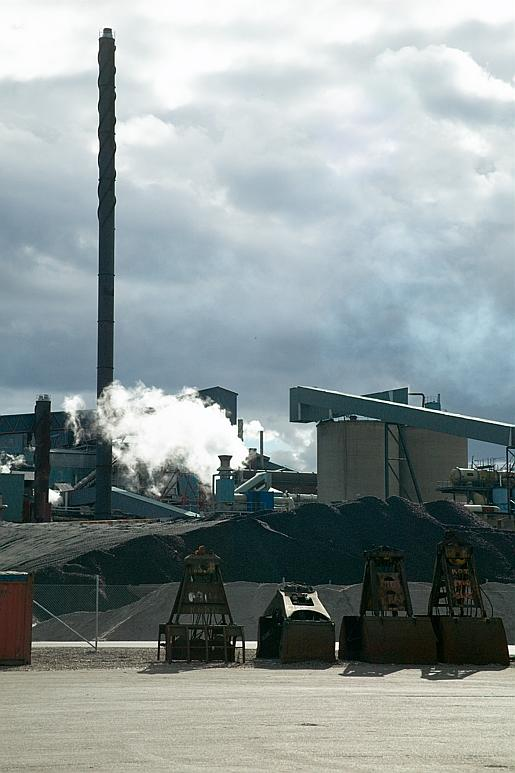
Boliden Harbor

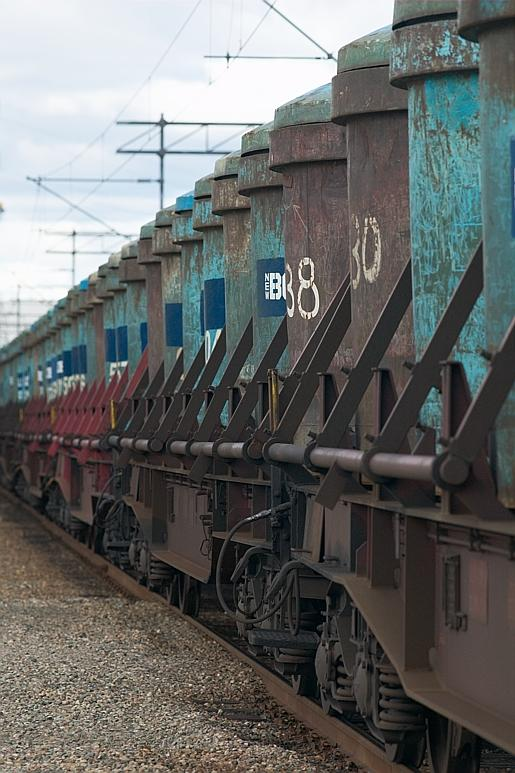
Industrial Boliden train.

In 2021, Boliden launched the construction of a leaching plant and underground residual repository, becoming the first copper smelter worldwide to have its own long-term waste disposal onsite. In 2024, Boliden received 88 million euros from EU's program Just Transition Fund to reduce the carbon dioxide emissions of its smelter, the latter causing 80% of the industrial pollution in the region.

== Incidents ==
On 13 June 2023, a massive fire broke out in the electrolysis plant. 190 people were laid off after the fire, and the damage was estimated to take years to repair. This came after it was announced that a new electrolysis factory would be built on site. The casualties from the incident were completely covered by the plant's insurer.
