= Kevitsa mine =

Mine in Sodankylä, Finland

- Location within Finland
- Location: Lapland, Finland; 67°41′38″N 26°55′41″E
- Products: Nickel, Copper, Gold, Platinum, Palladium
- Opened: 2012
- Company: Boliden AB
- Acquired: 2016

The Kevitsa mine is a large nickel-copper mine in the north of Finland in Sodankylä, Lapland. Opened in 2012 by First Quantum Minerals, Kevitsa represents one of the largest nickel reserve in Finland, with estimated reserves of 237.4 million tonnes of ore grading 0.3% nickel (amounting to 710,000 tonnes of nickel metal).

In 2016, the Swedish mining company Boliden AB purchased the mine for US$712 million.
