= Val di Stava dam collapse =

1985 dam structural failure near Tesero, Italy

Coordinates: 46°19′14.09″N 11°30′2.41″E

- Date: 19 July 1985; 41 years ago
- Location: Stava, Trentino, Italy
- Type: Dam failure
- Deaths: 268
- Suspects: 10 charged
- Verdict: Guilty
- Convictions: Culpable disaster and multiple manslaughter

The Val di Stava Dam collapse occurred on 19 July 1985, when two tailings dams above the village of Stava, near Tesero, Italy, collapsed. It resulted in one of Italy's worst disasters, killing 268 people, destroying 63 buildings and demolishing eight bridges.

The upper dam broke first, leading to the collapse of the lower dam. Around 180,000 cubic metres (6,350,000 ft^{3}) of mud, sand, and water were released into the Rio di Stava valley and toward the village of Stava at a speed of 90 km/h (56 mph). Having crashed through the village, the torrent continued until it reached the Avisio River a further 4.2 km (2.6 mi) away, destroying everything in its path.

== Cause ==
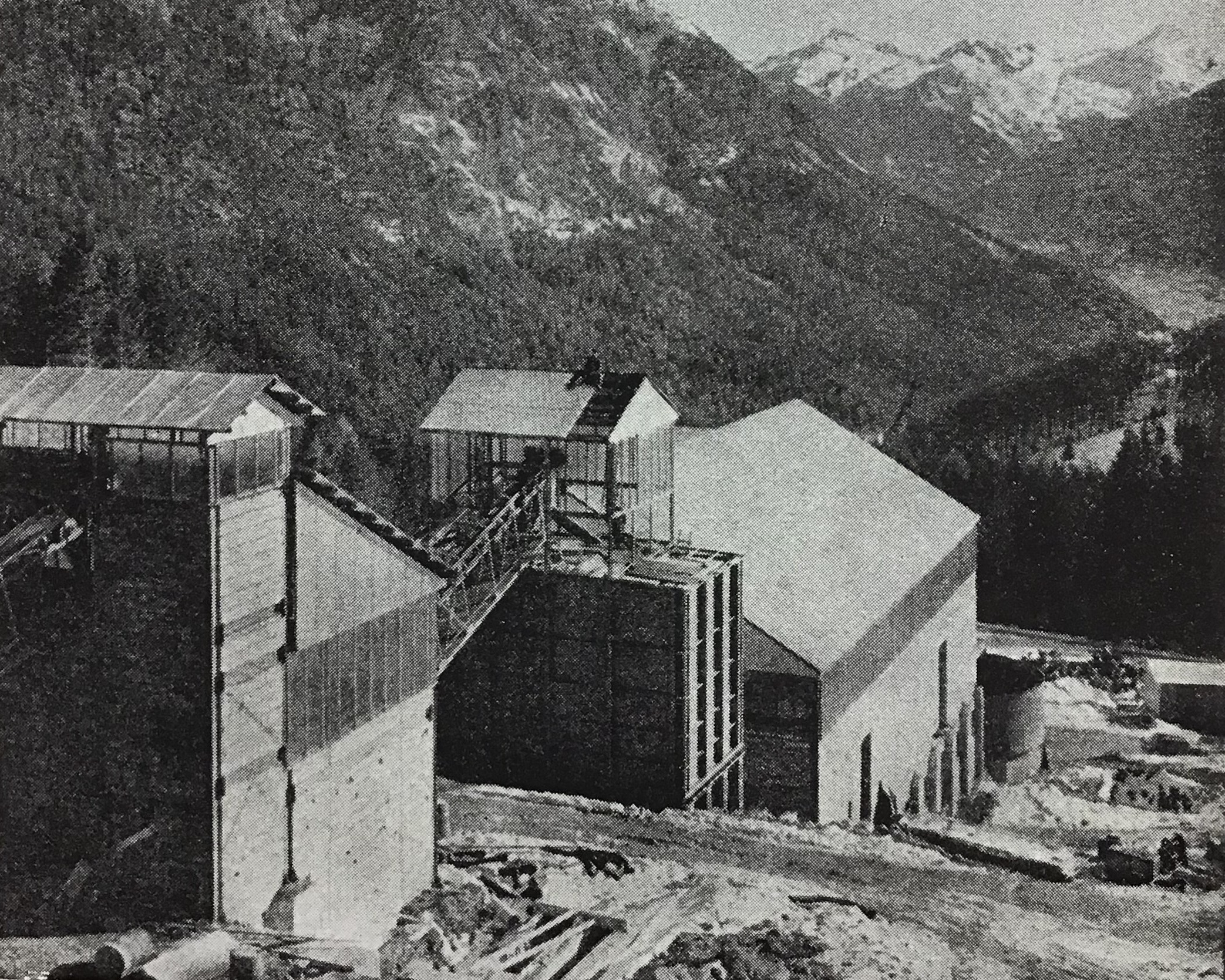
The Val di Stava (Trento) fluorite processing plant in the early 1960s. Beyond the road, the first dam

An investigation into the disaster found that the dams were poorly maintained and the margin of safe operation was very small.

A pipe in the upper dam used to drain water had begun to sag under the weight of sediment, making the dam's drainage less effective. Meanwhile, water continued to be pumped into the reservoir behind the dam, which, coupled with the less efficient drainage, meant the pressure on the bank of the upper dam began to increase. Following the path of least resistance, water began penetrating the bank, causing the soil within to liquefy and weaken the bank until it failed. The water and tailings from the upper dam then flowed into the lower dam, which, under the immense pressure produced, failed thirty seconds later.

In June 1992, ten people were convicted of culpable disaster and multiple manslaughter for their roles in the accident and were all sentenced to prison.

== See also ==
- Montecatini Chemicals Company
- National Geographic Seconds From Disaster episodes
- 1998 Residue dam wall collapse of the Aznalcollar mine
- 2000 Baia Mare cyanide spill
- 2010 Ajka alumina plant accident
- Vajont Dam

== Sources ==
- AA.VV., Stava perché. La genesi, le cause, la responsabilità della catastrofe di Stava negli atti dell'inchiesta ministeriale e nelle sentenze del procedimento penale. Graziano Lucchi (Ed.), 254 pp., Curcu & Genovese, Trento (1995).
- AA.VV., Stava un anno dopo. Supplement to issue 167 of the daily newspaper Alto Adige of 19 July 1986, 155 pp., Bolzano (1986).
- AA.VV., Stava, tragici bacini: pericolo mortale per l'abitato. ACLI Milano (Ed.), Publiprint, Trento (1988).
- AA.VV., Stava tre anni dopo. Associazione Sinistrati Val di Stava & Parrocchia di Tesero (Ed.), Cassa Rurale di Tesero e Panchià, Tesero (Trento) (1989).
- AA.VV., Genesi, cause e responsabilità del crollo delle discariche della miniera di Prestavel. La catastrofe della Val di Stava, 19 luglio 1985. Fondazione Stava 1985 (Ed.), 16 pp., Tesero (Trento) (2001).
- Bernardinatti R. & Basso G., Tesero: venerdì 19 luglio 1985; l'Adige daily newspaper, Trento (1985).
- Calvino F., Nosengo S., Bassi G., Ceola V., Berti P., Borasi F., Farinelli R., Cescatti L., Gamberini S. & Canestrini S., Un processo alla speculazione industriale. La strage di Stava negli interventi della parte civile alternativa, Collegio di difesa di parte civile alternativa (Ed.), Trento (1989), 205 pp.
- Decarli D., Giovannini A. & Degasperi A., Tesero, 19 luglio 1985: per non dimenticare, Publilux, Trento (1985).
- Doliana C., Stava. L'altra storia. 40 anni tra chimica e mistero, Reverdito, Trento (2025).
- Giordani I., Lucchi G., Salghetti Drioli G. & Tosatti G., Stava 1985. Una documentazione. Centro di documentazione della Fondazione Stava 1985, 96 pp., Curcu & Genovese, Trento (2003).
- ISMES, Indagini geotecniche di laboratorio su materiali provenienti dai bacini Prestavel in località Stava, Tesero (Trento). Final technical report for the Board of Experts of the Court of Trento, 5 Vols., Bergamo (1986) – unpublished.
- Salomoni P. & Doliana C. (Eds.),Stava: dalla strage al processo: cittadini, politici, industriali, avvocati e una montagna di denaro attorno alla sciagura mineraria del 19 luglio 1985, Publiprint, Trento (1988).
- Struffi M. (Ed.), 269 morti attendono giustizia. Supplement to issue 169 of the daily newspaper l'Adige of 19 July 1986, Trento (1986).
- Tosatti G. (Ed.), Rassegna dei contributi scientifici sul disastro della Val di Stava (Provincia di Trento), 19 luglio 1985 / A Review of Scientific Contributions on the Stava Valley Disaster (Eastern Italian Alps), 19 July 1985. Special volume of the GNDCI-CNR, 480 pp., Pitagora Editrice, Bologna (2003).
