= Marcos A. Orellana =

Chilean-American environmental lawyer (born 1971)

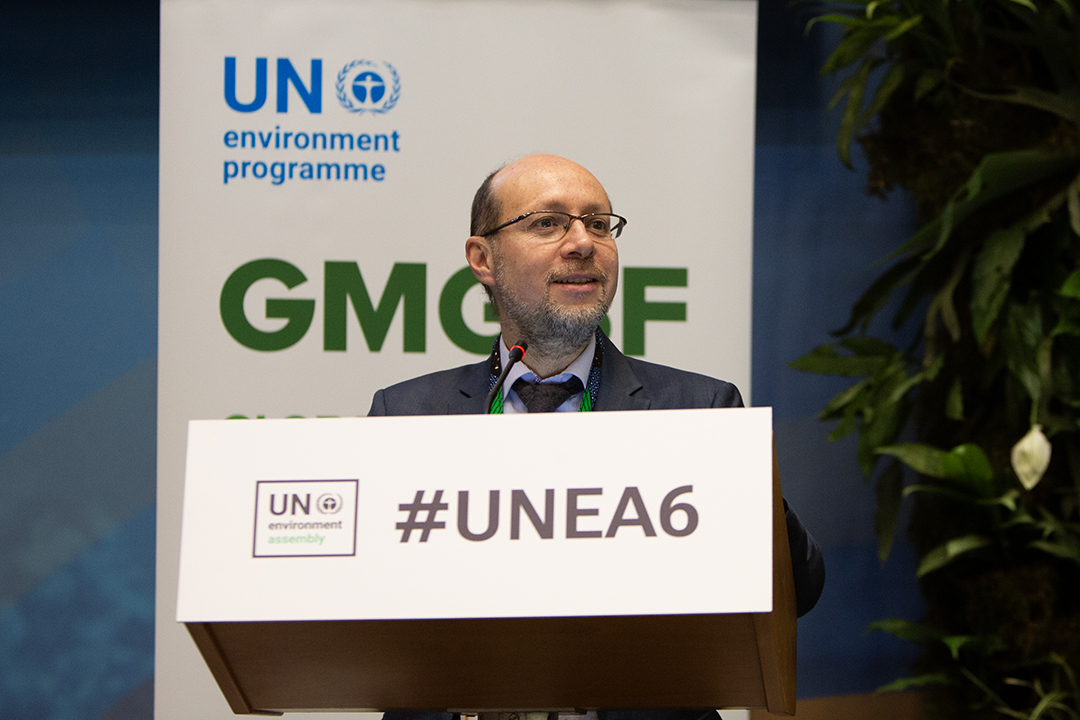
- Orellana at UNEA-6 in 2024

United Nations Special Rapporteur on Toxics and Human Rights
- In office 2020–2026
- Succeeded by: Bethanie Carney Almroth

Personal details
- Born: 1971 (age 54–55) Santiago, Chile
- Education: Pontificia Universidad Católica de Chile; American University
- Occupation: Lawyer, professor

Marcos A. Orellana (born 1971) is an expert in international environmental law. He is an adjunct professor at American University Washington College of Law and, from 2020 to 2026, was the United Nations Special Rapporteur on Toxics and Human Rights. He holds dual Chilean and U.S. nationalities.

Born in Santiago, Chile, Orellana studied law at the Pontificia Universidad Católica de Chile from 1990 to 1996. He then began his master's degree at the American University in Washington, D.C., United States.

Orellana advises civil society organisations worldwide on environmental law and climate justice issues.

He was also legal advisor to the President of the 25th Conference of the Parties to the UN Framework Convention on Climate Change. From 2020 to 2026, he was the UN Special Rapporteur on Toxics and Human Rights, when he was succeeded by Bethanie Carney Almroth.

== Publications ==
- Quality Control of the Right to a Healthy Environment, 2018, Cambridge University Press
- Governance and the Sustainable Development Goals: The Increasing Relevance of Access Rights in Principle 10 of the Rio Declaration, 2016, Review of European Community & International Environmental Law
