= Fatma Zohra Ksentini =

Algerian politician

Fatma Zohra Ouhachi-Vesely

United Nations special rapporteur on Toxic Wastes
- In office 1995–2004
- Preceded by: Position established
- Succeeded by: Okechukwu Ibeanu

United Nations Commission on Human Rights special rapporteur on Human Rights and the Environment
- In office 1989–1994

Personal details
- Born: Fatma Zohra Ksentini

Fatma Zohra Ouhachi-Vesely (née Ksentini) is an Algerian woman who was the first United Nations special rapporteur on toxic wastes from 1995 to 2004. Prior to her position, she was a Special Rapporteur in the Sub-Commission on Prevention of Discrimination and Protection of Minorities from 1989 to 1994.

== Career ==
Ksentini was part of the Sub-Commission on Prevention of Discrimination and Protection of Minorities when she was named special rapporteur on Human Rights and the Environment in 1989. For the United Nations Commission on Human Rights, she started a four-year investigation into environmental human rights in 1990. After completing her research in 1994, she submitted her findings and cosigned the Draft Declaration of Principles on Human Rights and the Environment.

In 1995, Ksentini became the United Nations Special Rapporteur on Toxic Wastes. During the beginning of her tenure, she gathered information on the health effects of disposing toxic wastes. After submitting her report in 1997, Ksentini criticized the Office of the United Nations High Commissioner for Human Rights for not providing her the necessary funding to conduct on the ground research. After being reappointed in 1998, Ksentini began developing proposals on the elimination of toxic waste disposals into developing countries. Her final term as Special Rapporteur started in 2001 and ended in 2004.

Outside of her work as Special Rapporetur, Ksentini was the chairwoman of the Working Group on Contemporary Forms of Slavery in 1991.

== Personal life ==
Ksentini was married to a Mr. Ouhachi-Vesely.
