= Laver (ghost town) =

Abandoned settlement in Älvsbyn Municipality, Sweden

Coordinates: 65°46′N 20°13′E

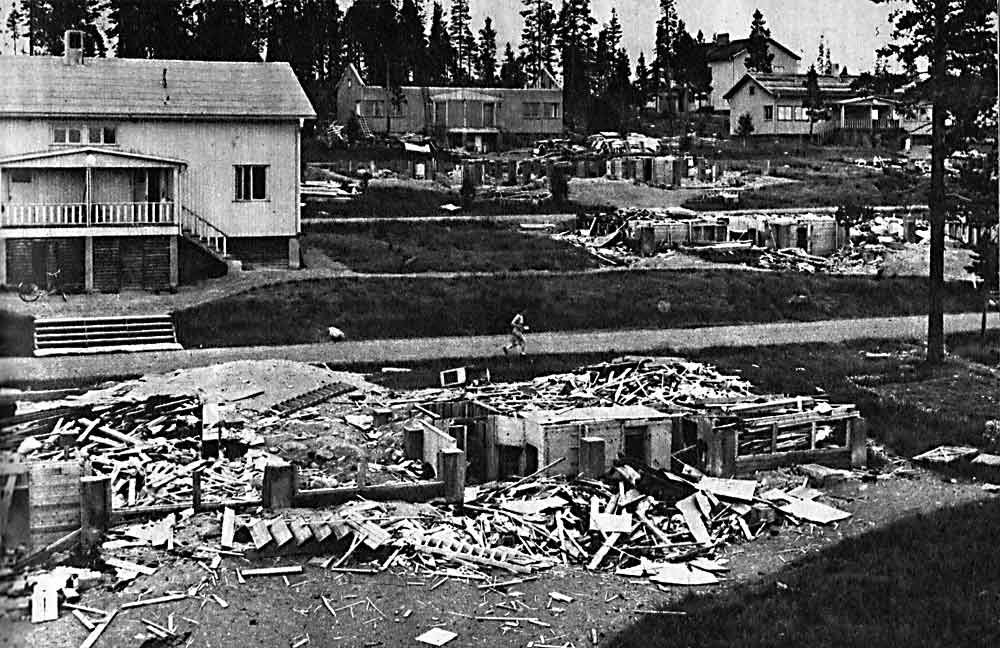
Laver in 1947, during the deconstruction.

Laver is a ghost town located about 15 km southwest of Vidsel and 50 km west of Älvsbyn in Sweden which existed between 1936 and 1947. It was a mining community where copper was extracted. About 350 people lived there at most. The operations of the Laver mine ended on 4 November 1946.
