= Okechukwu Ibeanu =

Nigerian professor and politician

United Nations special rapporteur on Toxic Wastes
- In office 2004–2010
- Preceded by: Fatma Zohra Ksentini
- Succeeded by: Călin Georgescu

Okechukwu Ibeanu is a Professor of Political Science and was also Dean, Faculty of the Social Sciences at the University of Nigeria, Nsukka. He was also special rapporteur of the United Nations Human Rights Council on the adverse effects of illicit movement and dumping of toxic waste on human rights.

Professor Ibeanu was previously programme officer of the MacArthur Foundation overseeing its human rights and Niger Delta programmes. A former Fellow of the United Nations University, Tokyo, he has also been a visiting scholar at Queen Elizabeth House, Oxford University, and the Woodrow Wilson Center, Washington D.C.

Professor Ibeanu sits on the boards of many research institutions including the Centre for Democracy and Development. He has published extensively on the Niger Delta and Nigerian politics in general, including Civil Society and Conflict Management in the Niger Delta (2005). His latest book titled Oiling Violence (2006) is on the proliferation of small arms and light weapons in the Niger Delta.

As of 2016 Okechukwu Ibeanu has officially been titled one of the commissioners of the Independent National "INEC" Electoral Commission. He is officially the commissioner of the Southeast section of Nigeria.

== See also ==
- United Nations special rapporteur
