= Kaldo converter =

Top blown rotary converter for metals

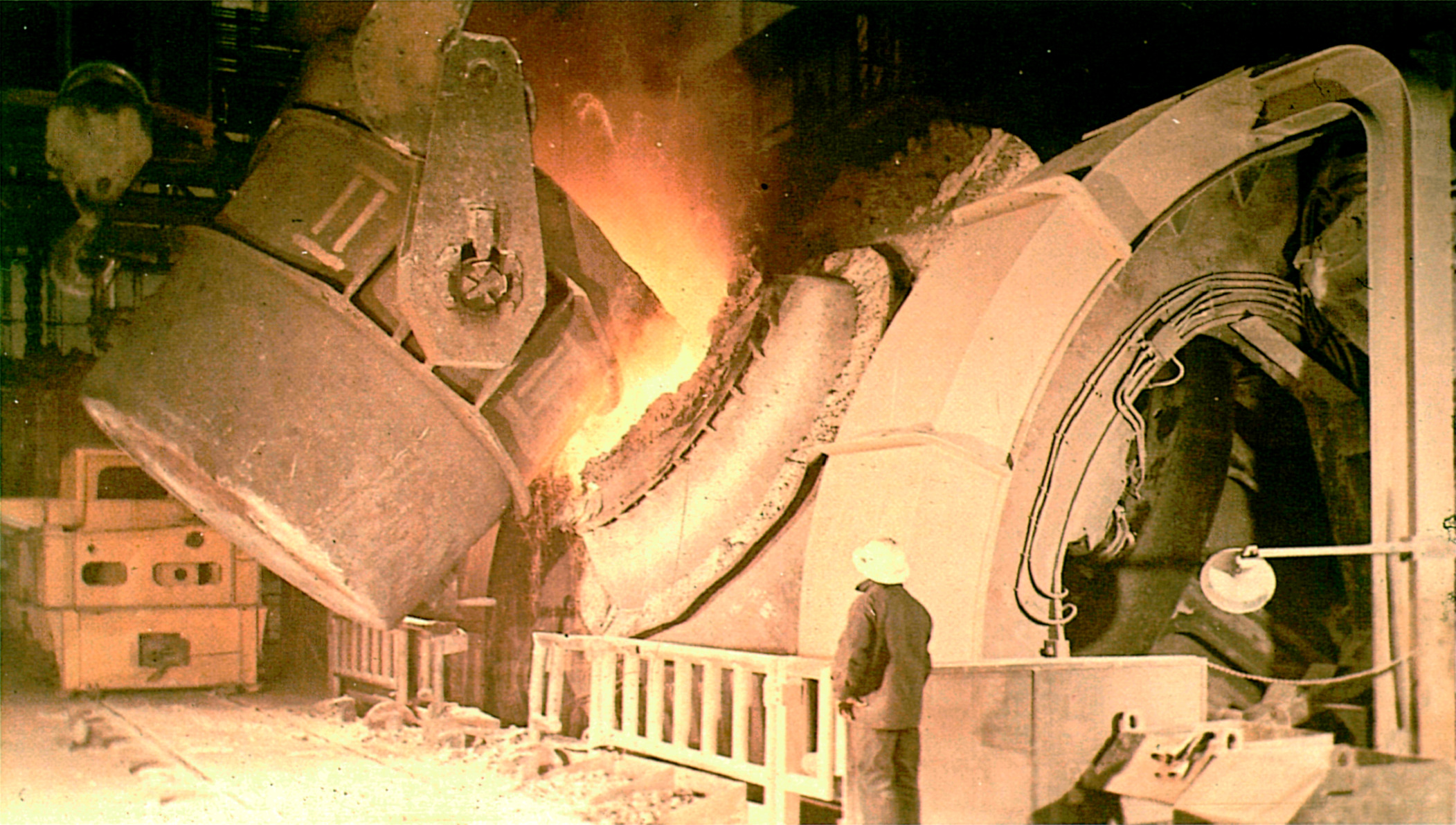
Kaldo convertoer in action, Sérémange plant

A Kaldo converter (using the Kaldo process or Stora-Kaldo process) is a rotary vessel oxygen based metal refining method. Originally applied to the refining of iron into steel, with most installations in the 1960s, the process is (2014) used primarily to refine non ferrous metals, typically copper. In that field, it is often named TBRC, or Top Blown Rotary Converter.

== History and description ==
Engineering drawing of Florange plant section with Kaldo converter

=== Steel production ===
Evolution of chemical composition and temperature of the liquid steel, during the blowing in a Kaldo converter. The iron content is linked with the slag composition, the others elements are taken in the metal.

The name "Kaldo" is derived from Prof. Bo Kalling, and from the Domnarvets Jernverk (Stora Kopparbergs Bergslag subsidiary) both key in the development of the process. Research into the use of a stirring to promote mixing, and therefore rate of conversion was investigated from the 1940s, and investigations into the use of oxygen began c.1948. The feedstock at the Domnarvet works had a phosphorus content of 1.8-2.0% and so the process was developed with one aim being dephosphorisation. The first production unit was installed in 1954 at Domnarvet Jernverk.

The converter was a top blow oxygen converter, similar to Linz-Donawitz (LD) type, using a cylindrical vessel; the vessel was tilted whilst conversion took place, with typical rotation speeds of around 30 revolutions per minute; the oxygen was injected via a lance, with slag forming materials added separately.

Kaldo converters were relatively common in the 1960s in the United Kingdom, during the transition from predominately open hearth process steelmaking to oxygen based steelmaking techniques. Converters were installed at Consett steelworks, Park Gate, Rotherham, Shelton works, Stoke-on-Trent; and Stanton Iron Works. Before the advent of the basic-LD process the Kaldo method was a preferred one in the UK for converting high phosphorus iron. The first unit in the UK was at Park Gate Works, Rotherham.

In the USA, the process was installed at the Sharon Steel Corporation (c.1962). A plant in Japan was installed for Sanyo Special Steel Co. (Himejii) in c.1965. A combined type of converter (LD-Kaldo), using elements of the Linz-Donawitz (LD) and Kaldo processes was installed 1965 in Belgium at Cockerill-Ougrée-Providence's plant in Marchienne-au-Pont as a multicompany research venture. In France, one Kaldo furnace was also installed (one 160t unit, 1960) at Sollac's Florange steelworks. It was followed in 1969 by two huge 240t units, the biggest Kaldo converters ever built (two times bigger than the previous bigger ones : 1000t rotating at 30 r.p.m. !), at de Wendel-Sidelor's (later Usinor-Sacilor) Gandrage-Rombas steelworks (Lorraine, France); these two converters did not meet expectations and the third additional planned Kaldo unit was not installed, instead two OLP (oxygène-lance-poudre) 240t units were used.

Disadvantages of the process, compared to non-rotating oxygen furnaces (e.g. LD type) were the higher capital cost, more difficult to upscale to higher outputs, and additional complexity (i.e. rotating parts and loading thereof). Advantages included the ability to use a high proportion of scrap metal, and good controllability of final steel specification. At the Park Gate works conversion time was 90 minutes, with up to 45% scrap loading, with a capacity of 75t in a 500t total, 16 feet (4.9 m) diameter converter, with a rotation speed of 40 revs per minute.

Due to high maintenance costs the Kaldo converter did not gain widespread usage in the steel industry, with non-rotating converters being preferred.

=== Non-ferrous production ===
Nickel matte was converted by Inco (Canada) in a pilot Kaldo converter in 1959, and Metallo-Chimique (Belgium) developed secondary copper smelting using the Kaldo type converters in the late 1960s. The Kaldo type converted is commonly known as a Top-Blown Rotary Converter (TBRC) in non-ferrous metal smelting terminology.

By the 1970s, the Kaldo furnace was in common use for copper and nickel smelting. A Kaldo converter for the smelting of lead was constructed by Boliden AB in Sweden in 1976.

Kaldo secondary copper units were still in use worldwide at the beginning of the 21st century, but as of 2011 no new units had been commissioned for around 10 years, suggesting that the process had been superseded.

== See also ==
- AJAX furnace
