= Almonte, Spain =

Almonte
- town and municipality
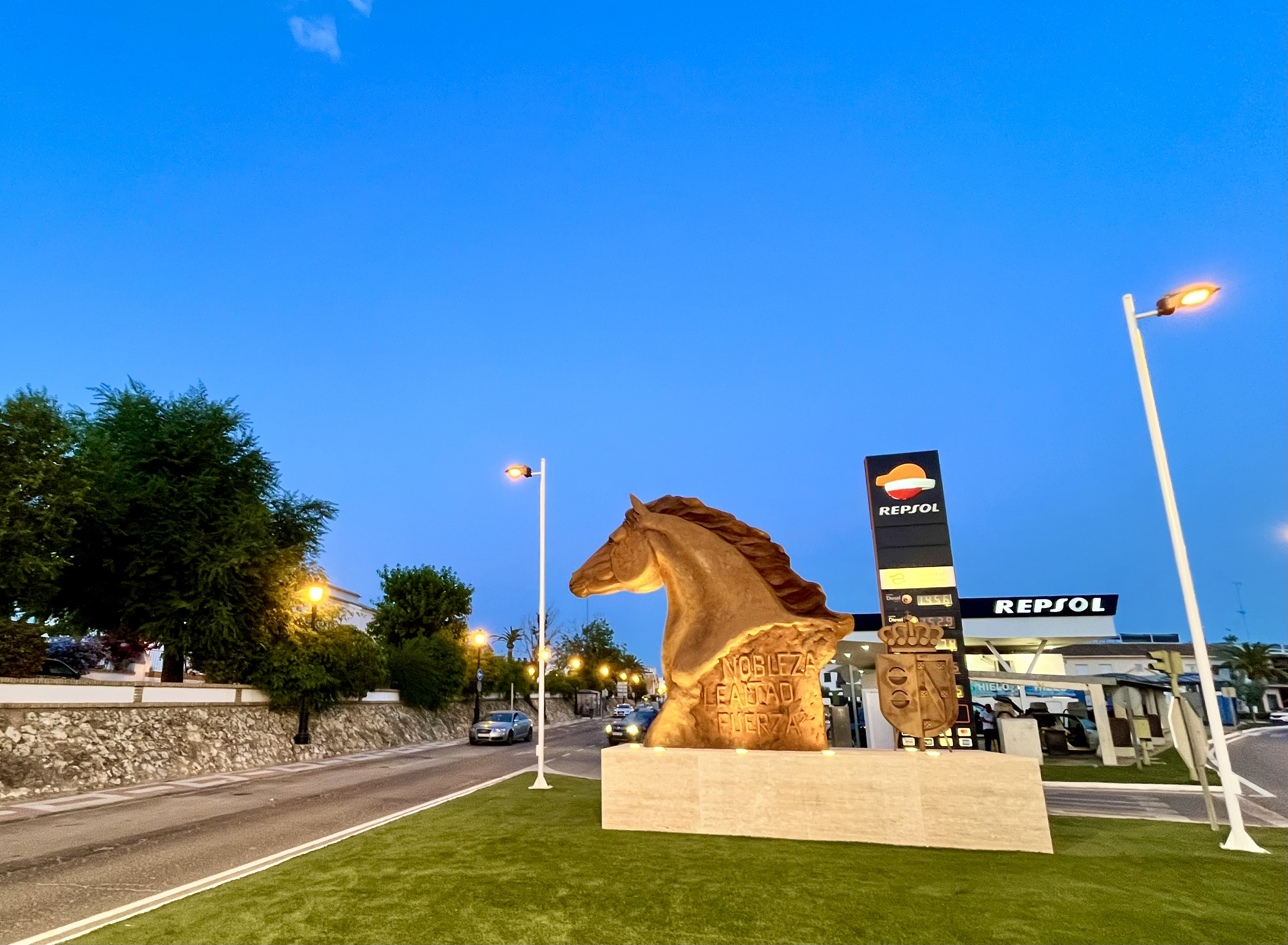
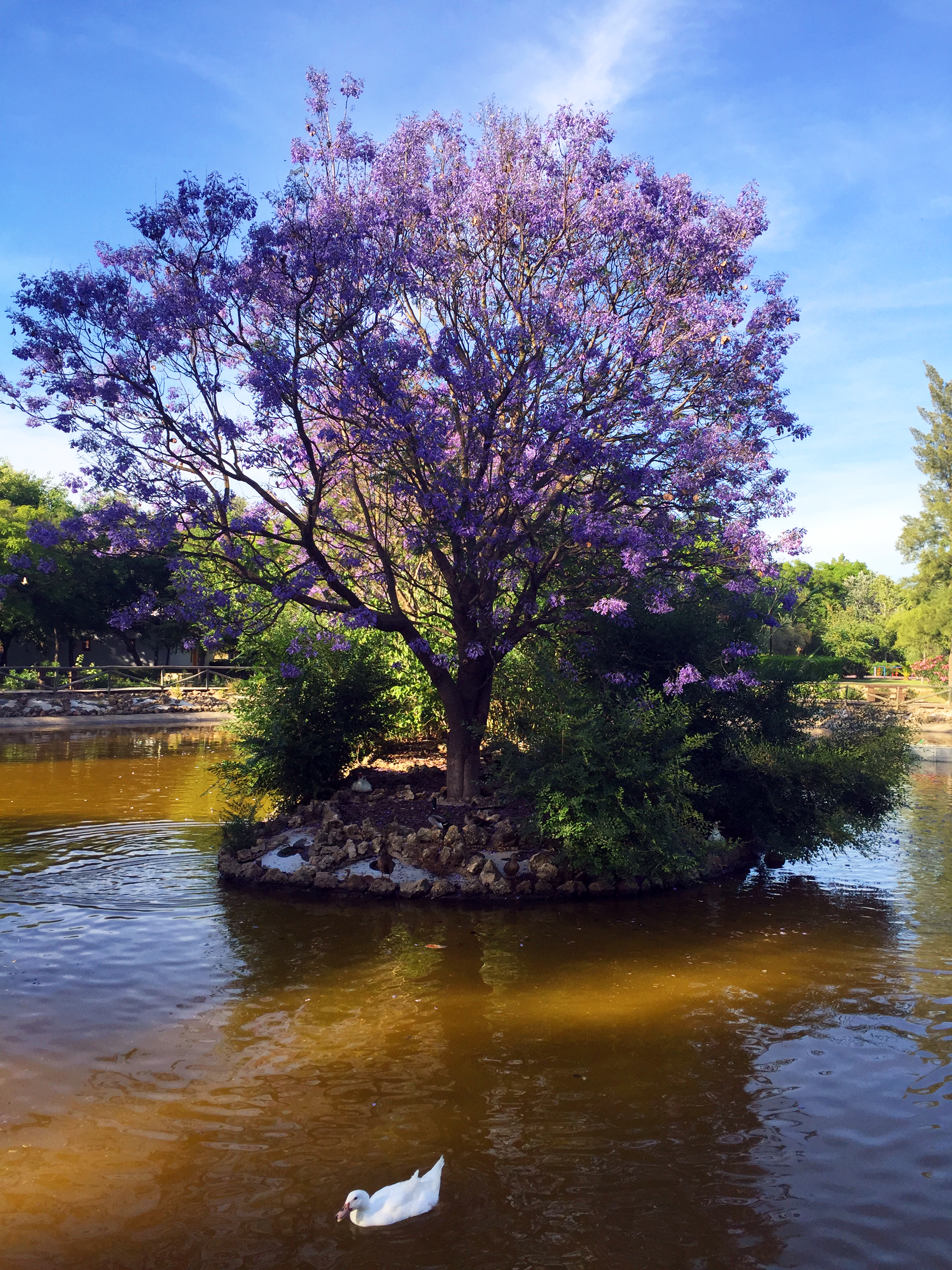
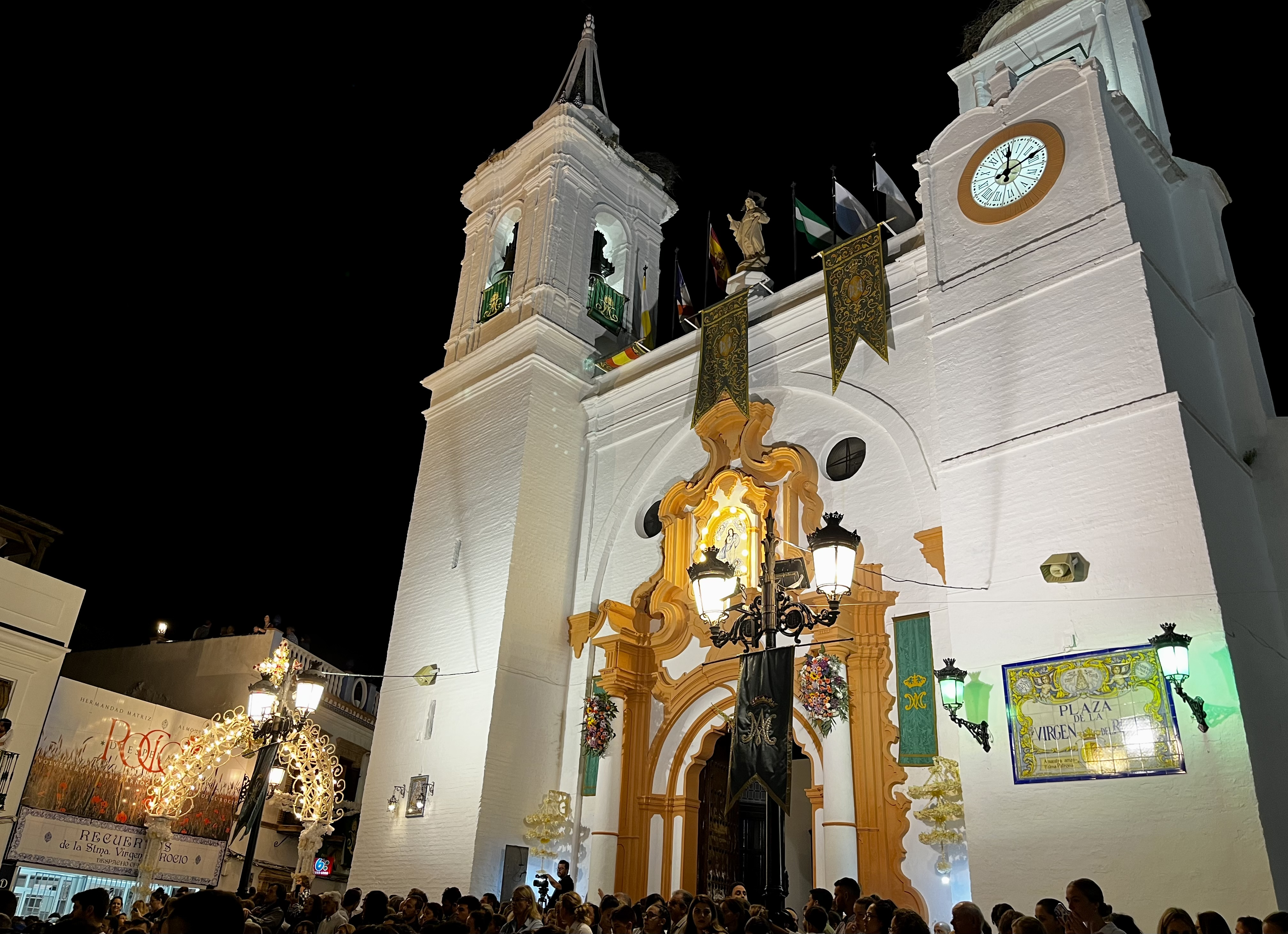
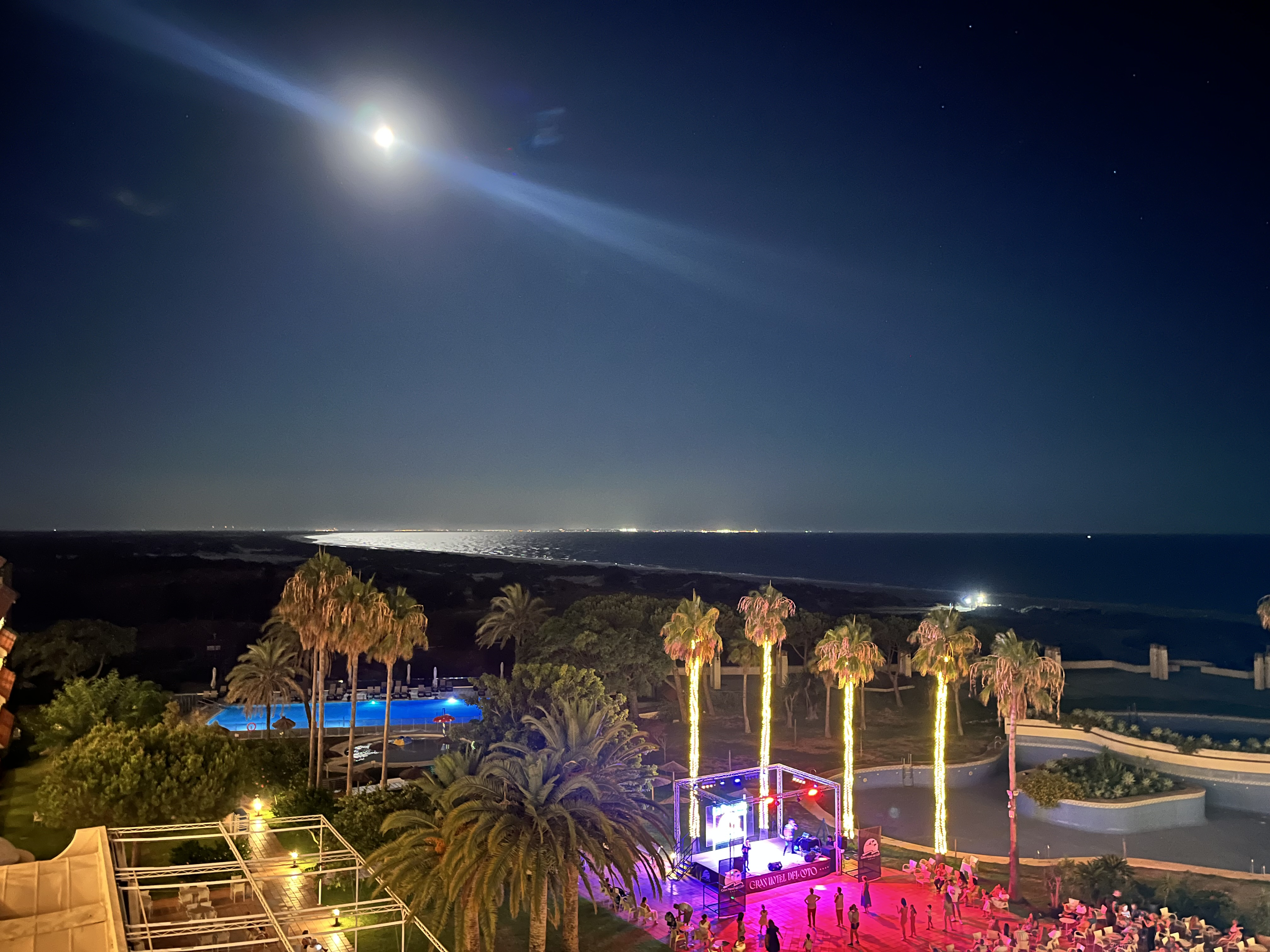
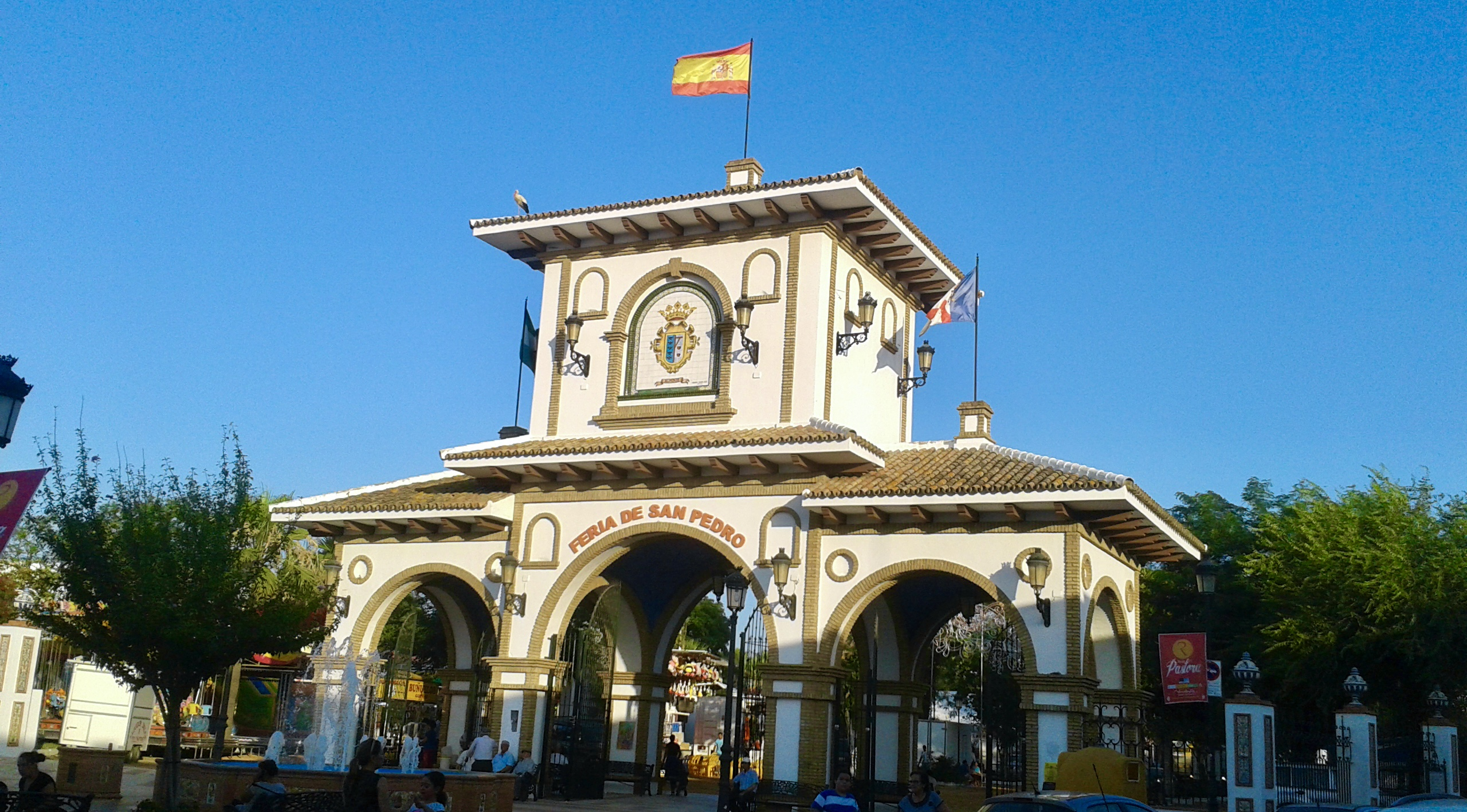
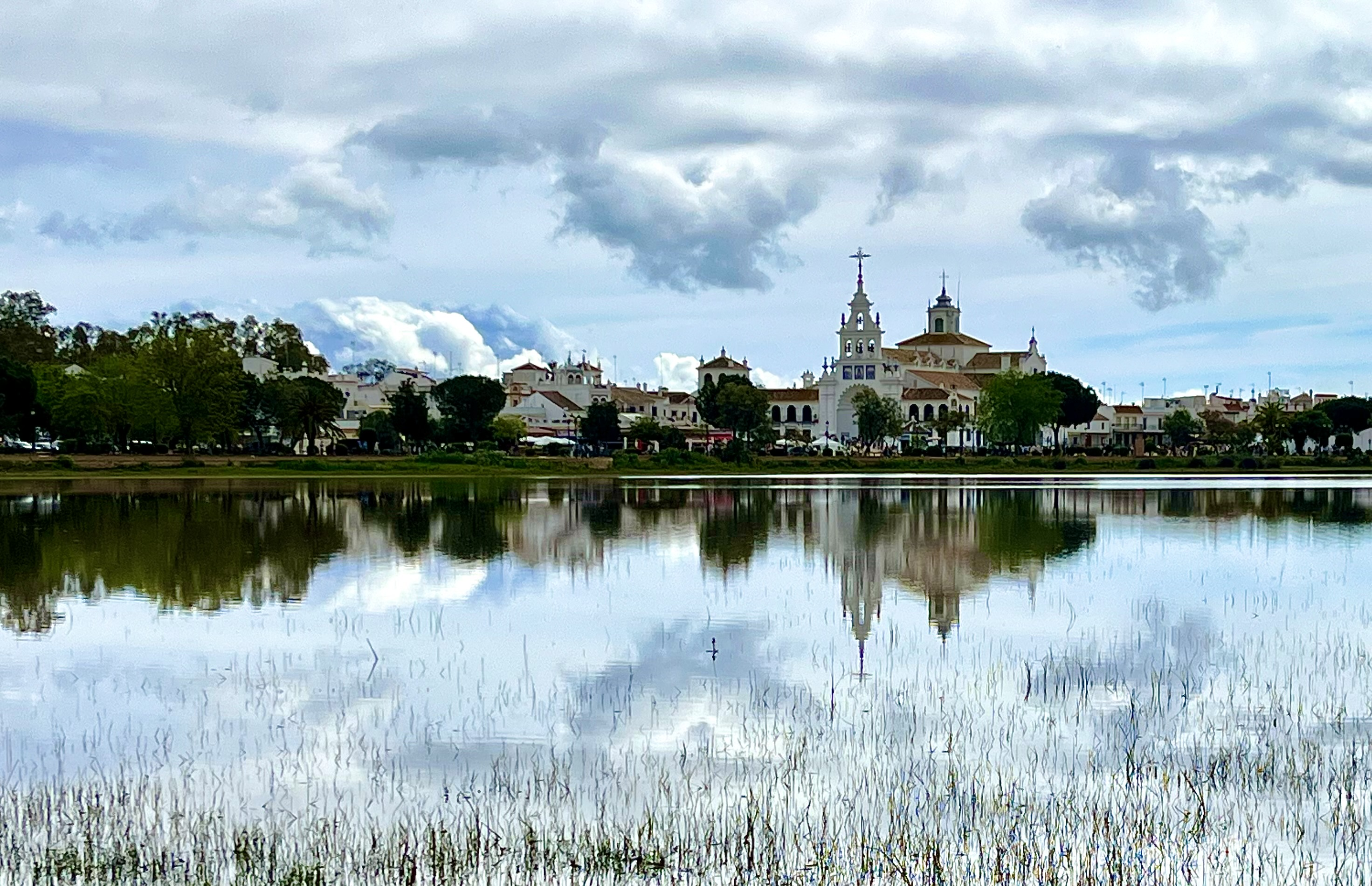
- Almonte’s northwest entrance “Alcalde Mojarro“ Park Church (13th century) Matalascañas beach “El Chaparral” Park Village of El Rocío (8th century)

- Flag Coat of arms

- Location in Spain
- Coordinates: 37°16′N 6°31′W
- Municipality: Huelva

Government
  - Mayor: Francisco Bella Galán

Area
  - Total: 861 km^{2} (332 sq mi)
  - Land: 861 km^{2} (332 sq mi)
  - Water: 0.00 km^{2} (0 sq mi)

Population (2023)
  - Total: 25,751
  - Density: 29.9/km^{2} (77.5/sq mi)
- Demonym(s): Almontean almonteño (m.), almonteña (f.)
- Time zone: UTC+1 (CET)
  - Summer (DST): UTC+2 (CEST)
- Website: www.almonte.es/es/

Almonte is a town and municipality located in the province of Huelva, in southwestern Spain. According to the 2022 census, it had a population of 25,448 inhabitants, ranking third within its province, just after Huelva, the capital city and Lepe. With its 859.21 km^{2} (33174 sq mi), it is the 19th largest municipality in Spain (7th in Andalusia) with a population density of 27/km^{2}. Its elevation is 75 m (246 ft) over sea level and it is 50 km far from Huelva. Almonte is recognised worldwide thanks to the village of El Rocío, which had a great influence in the American Wild West culture and hosts one of the most popular pilgrimages in the world. Most of the Doñana National Park, which is Europe's largest natural reserve and a World Heritage Site by UNESCO and the longest beach in Spain, which includes the Matalascañas beach, along with two of the Natural Monuments in Andalusia, are also in Almonte. Moreover, it is one of Spain's top organic fruit exporters and the first blueberry exporter in Europe. Almonte is a founding member and hosts the headquarters of National Park Towns Association Amuparna, is the first town to sign the Environmental Treaty, hosts the only rocket launching platform in the country and is the only municipality in southern Spain to have a presidential residence.

== History ==
Almonte, like other towns established before the Reconquista, has a rich history and has been involved in many historical events, including the Discovery of America, the Napoleonic Wars and the Spanish–American War. The purchase of “Las Rocinas” woods in the 16th century linked the town's history to the Atlantic coast and later on to Doñana, made a national park in the 1960s. Although officially founded during the 8th century, several civilisations had settled in its territory since prehistoric times, including Phoenicia, the Roman Empire, the Visigoths and Muslims. Once the territorial wars against Niebla were over, Almonte got its current extension in 1335. The current protected status of part of the municipality under the Doñana Natural Environment implies an added difficulty when carrying out archaeological surveys for an in-depth study of the prehistoric and ancient periods of the area

=== Prehistory ===
The region of Tartessia existed since the Chalcolithic, with river Tartessos (later renamed Baetis by Romans). There are remains left from the Bronze Age in Almonte, including Tartessian metallic tools by the San Bartolomé stream, in the northern part of Almonte's territory. It is thought that this 1,000 acre Tartessian village was mainly focused on silver production and trade and had two different golden ages, one of them during the Chalcolithic and another one during the late Bronze Age, from the 9th and 6th centuries BC. The typical architecture from that age included the oval-shaped huts dug on the ground and made of sticks and mud. This settlement may have had an active trading with Greeks and Phoenicians and was called San Bartolomé de Almonte, next to the current town and the ancient Lacus Ligustinus (Ligustinian Lake), which covered most of the territory between Seville and Cádiz, and dried completely in 700BC.

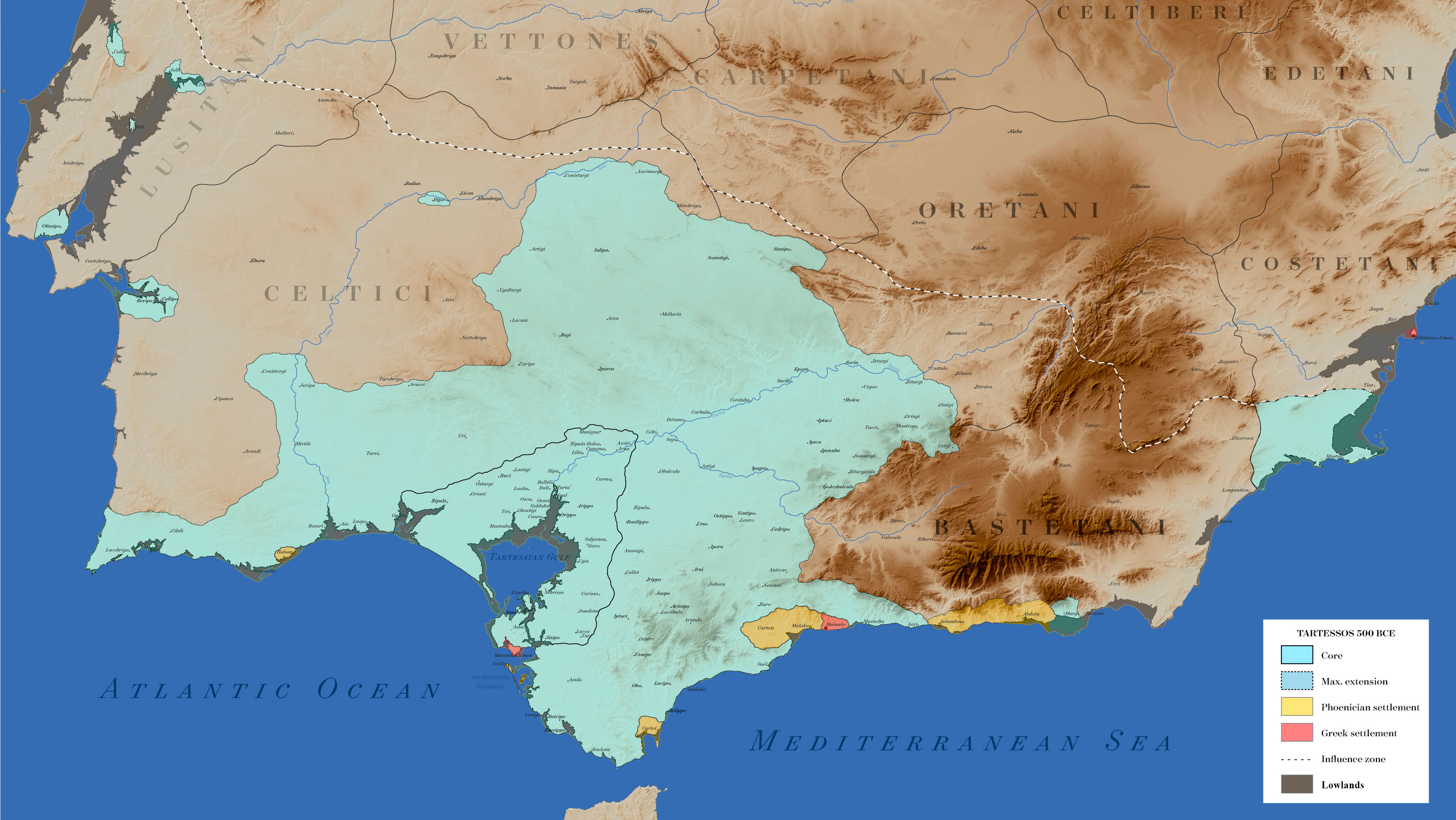
The ancient region of Tartessia, with the Ligustinian Lake

=== Ancient history ===
There are also remains of Roman presence in the area, with an ancient settlement called Alostigi which existed during the 5th century BC and may have been located at the modern town of Almonte. Archaeologists George Bonsor and Adolf Schulten, in their search for Atlantis, discovered remains of a garum factory and a settlement near Cerro del Trigo (Spanish for wheat hill), which is nowadays part of Doñana. At least 15 other factories have been found throughout Almonte's coast, along with a Roman necropolis and coins dating from centuries 5th and 2nd BC. The above-mentioned Ligustinian Lake, which was used for sea trading by Tartessian people, had been drying over time until becoming the current Guadalquivir's delta as the only major navigable connection to the Atlantic.

=== Middle Ages ===
The current town of Almonte was officially established during the 8th century AD with the name of Al-Yabal (literally, "the Mount") and was part of the Taifa of Niebla. Later on, in the 10th century, Muslim historian Ibn Hayyan makes reference to a fortress named Al Munt in his work Al Muqtabis, proving that this new Latinised name for the town was already in use. The Umayyads were the first to tame and breed the wild horses which had inhabited the area for centuries, and were later registered as a protected species.

Almonte was reconquered by the Castillians at the beginning of the 13th century, being taken over as a protectorate. After a major Muslim rebellion, the territory was absorbed by the Kingdom of Seville. King Alfonso X "The Wise", wrapped up in the legend of a hunter who found the Virgin Mary deep within Woods of Las Rocinas, ordered to build in 1270 the first sanctuary devoted to Saint Mary of Las Rocinas, later becoming the worldwide-known Virgin of El Rocío. The statue of the Virgin of El Rocío is an anonymous gothic carved wood sculpture dating from the 12th century. The current version has sufferend some remodelling during the Baroque period.

In 1335, nobleman Alvar Pérez de Guzmán becomes owner of Almonte, which was already independent from the County of Niebla, established in 1369. In the 14th century, Almonte and Niebla went to war for territorial reasons. The conflict ended when the Duke of Medina Sidonia established the frontiers, becoming owners of Almonte, while being at the same time Count of the neighbouring towns Niebla and Sanlúcar.

=== Modern history ===
Trading flourished in Almonte during the discovery of America, when Christopher Columbus set sail from the neighbouring port of Palos de la Frontera and goods were transported from Seville. Olive oil was the main export from Almonte and the bustle of traders boosted interest in the Virgin of El Rocío. In fact, an archaeological research carried out by the University of Huelva in April 2024, confirmed that the village of El Rocío was one of the most important medieval river ports. They used GPR to scan different subsurface soil layers beneath the temple and its surroundings. Almonte exerted cultural influence over the American colonies, especially in the Wild West architecture and horse breeding. The typical sandy unpaved roads and the wooden hitching rails to tie horses up were already present in the village of El Rocío and most likely exported to the United States. The Mustang horse breed was also brought over from the surrounding areas, its name being derived from the Spanish "mostrenco" (meaning "wild"), a term which also applies to a local Marismeña (cow breed from Almonte).

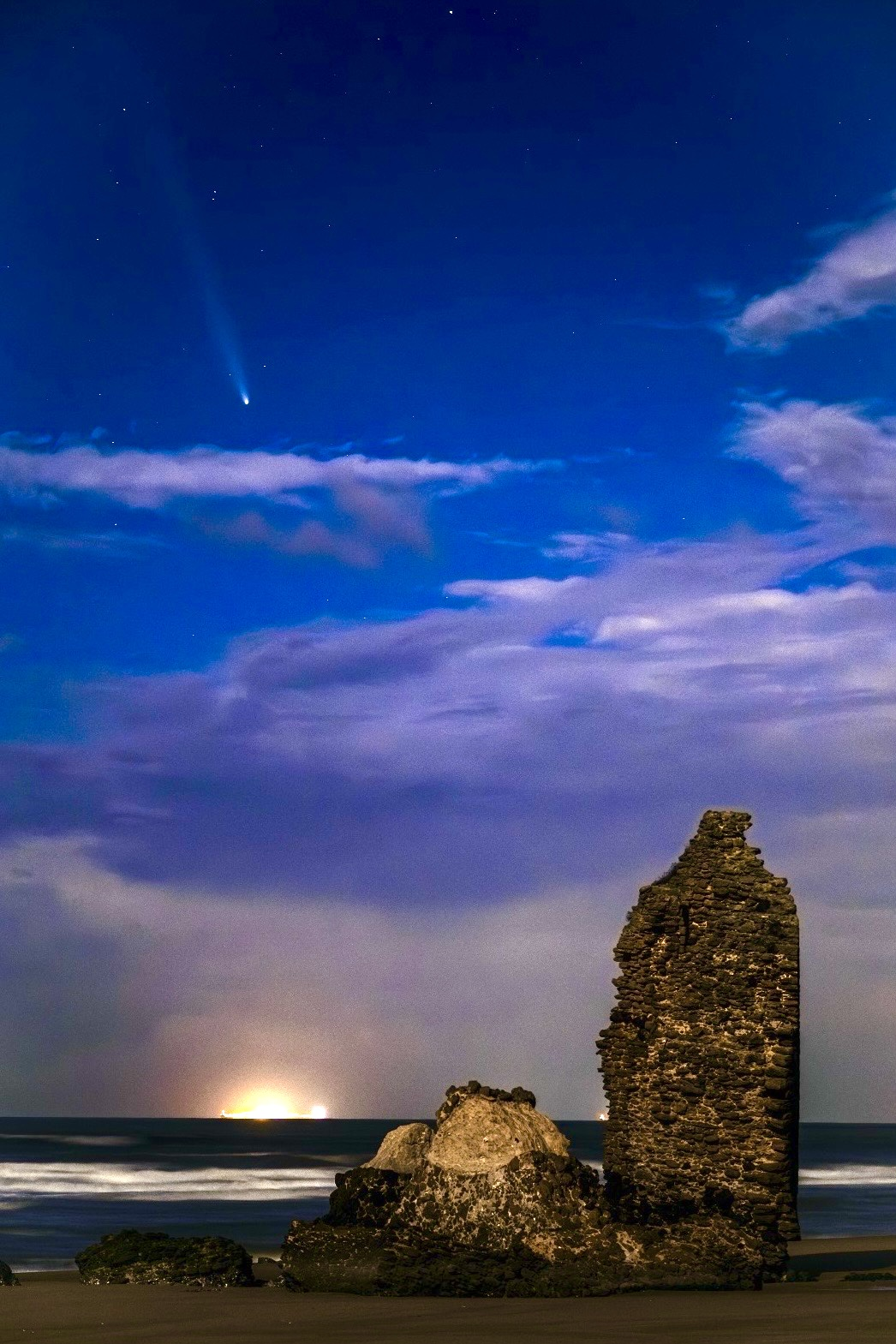
Ruins of Torre del Oro (Almonte)

In 1499 the Duke of Medina Sidonia acquired the lordship of Almonte, with the intention of unifying their lands of Huelva and Cádiz. In 1583 Almonte acquired the surroundings south of La Rocina Stream for 250 ducats, including what would later become a Royal forest by order of the King and later renamed Doñana after the duchess of Medina Sidonia, Doña Ana de Silva. The locals could finally expand farming, agricultural and fishing activities there. Landowners would manage the economy up to the 19th century, when the population was about 1,500 people. The Spanish monarchs would visit Doñana on a regular basis and finally established an official residence in the Palacio de las Marismillas. During the sixteenth century there were numerous lawsuits against Niebla and the Duke of Medina Sidonia for the ownership, use and jurisdiction of the Doñana territory, especially the one affecting hunting activities. In this century, several defensive towers were built all along the southern Spanish coast by order of king Philip II, six of them within the coast of Almonte.

In 1583 Almonte purchased Doñana from the duke and the locals could finally expand farming, agricultural and fishing activities there. Landowners would manage the economy up to the 19th century, when the population was about 1,500 people. In 1598 the Virgin was taken to Almonte for the first time ever, and later this displacement became usual every time the town faced a crisis (from natural disasters to wars). This same year, a Confraternity is officially established, the Hermandad Matriz (Spanish for Matrix Confraternity). "Saint Mary of Las Rocinas", official name for the Virgin of El Rocío became patron saint of Almonte in 1653 and different surrounding towns affiliated to the Hermandad Matriz, becoming filial confraternities, the oldest ones being Villamanrique, Pilas, La Palma, Moguer and Sanlúcar. Over time, national and international confraternities would follow, including Belgium, Japan or Australia.

In 1747, the council removed taxes on trading in El Rocío during the Pilgrimage of El Rocío, boosting the number of visitors. The Great Lisbon earthquake of 1755 swept away the entire Atlantic coast, including great parts of the city of Huelva and several fortified towers built on the coast to defend the shores. At least six of these towers were in Almonte and still remain standing, except for Torre de la Higuera (literally "fig tree tower"), which is upside down and is often referred to as a touristic symbol for the town. The sanctuary of El Rocío was damaged too and had to be rebuilt.

During the 18th and 19th centuries people from Almonte made a living with agricultural (chiefly olive grove and vineyard) and farming activities (horse, goat, sheep, pig and bees). Being one of the most extensive municipal territories in Spain, its inhabitants have never lacked resources.

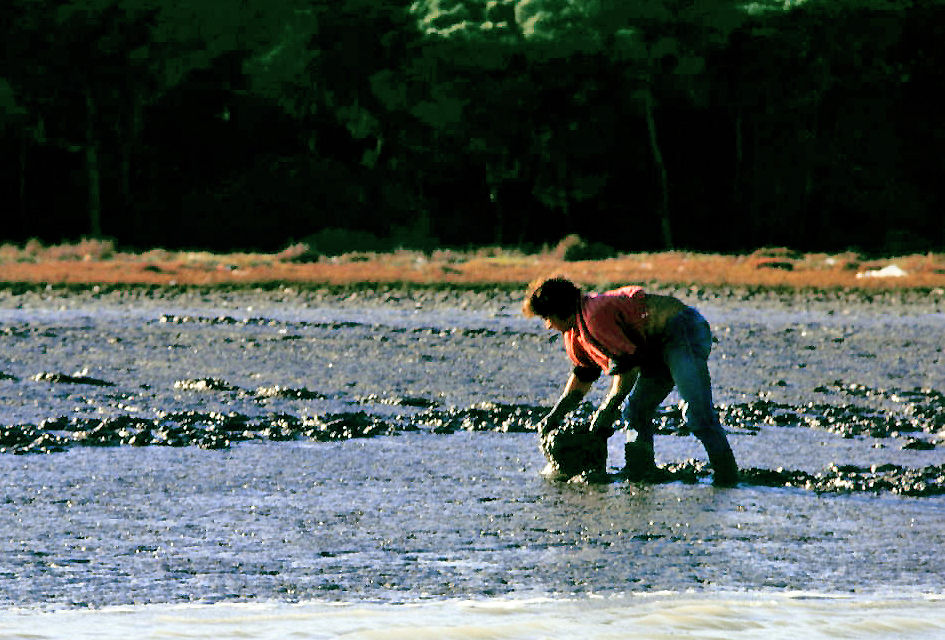
Shellfish catcher in the Guadalquivir river in the 80s

In 1810, during the war against France, French captain Pierre D'Oisseaux was executed in Almonte. The event brought about a response involving 1,000 French soldiers heading towards the town from the city of Seville. Unable to resist such an attack, the locals took the Virgin to town, praying for her intervention. The French troops would never arrive at Almonte and turned around at the time they were next to the neighbouring town of Pilas. People then decided to show their gratitude by celebrating an annual vow called "El Rocío Chico" (literally, the "small Rocío") every August.

Several lands and properties were privatised and sold during the Spanish confiscation throughout the 19th century, boosting the number of farmers and landowners. The Law of Lordship of 6 August 1811 allowed the Dukes of Medina Sidonia to become full owners of a large part of Doñana, preventing its confiscation into the private hands of farmers, which has made it possible to better preserve this territory, despite being a socially controversial measure. Domingo Castellanos, a bourgeois Almontean farmer, was one of the main opponents of the dukes' municipal administration and also the owner of the hunting reserve during the 19th century, helping to foster environmental interest in the area. In 1900 they sold the property to winemaker Guillermo Garvey and a hunting society was formed with British naturalist members such as Abel Chapman, who promoted the territory internationally. The Marquis of Mérito and the businessman Salvador Nogueras purchased the land soon after and were later forced to promote an ambitious reforestation plan due to the threat of expropriation by the State in 1952 for commercial purposes From 1949 on, it was established that the Virgin would be taken from her sanctuary in El Rocío to Almonte every seven years, spending nine months there. This event attracts hundreds of thousands of people to town, prompting a sophisticated security plan involving police, first aid rooms and ambulances, helicopters and firemen to ensure the festivity goes on correctly.

Within the 1940s large-scale reforestation policy in Spain, more than 30,000 hectares in Almonte were replanted with several species of blue gum, redgum, guayule, wattles and cypress. Other local species were also planted, like stone pine. 13 km south of Almonte, half between the town and the sea, a forest settlement called "Los Cabezudos" (Spanish for "the hillocks") was established. The road that leads to the settlement currently ends at road A-494, although it was formerly a path called Camino del Río de Oro (Gold River Way), because it reached this stream next to the Torre del Río de Oro. It had a school, church, doctor and several shops, being ahead of neighbouring towns regarding agricultural technology and drainage for its 300 inhabitants. These were engineers and foresters along with their families, whose job included wood, oil and cellulose extraction from trees in the factories. Eminent people have visited the area over time, including the former Queen of Spain, who landed her helicopter in Cabezudos on her way to El Rocío in 1983. Cabezudos started to depopulate in the late 60s, ending up completely uninhabited in the late 80s. Most of the people moved to Almonte, the core town. Nowadays, Cabezudos is a ghost town in ruins within the surroundings of Doñana National Park and is therefore protected. A consensus on whether new uses can be given to the houses is currently held.

In 1953, the first national modern campaign of bird ringing was carried out in Almonte, promoted by the biologist José Antonio Valverde, serving as a turning point in the promotion of the scientific potential of the area and evidencing the need to create a future ornithological reserve. In 1957, the Doñana Expedition was carried out, with English ornithologists. Doñana already appeared in the international press as the most impressive bird reserve in Europe and in 1959 the scientific organisation Wetlands International focused on the installation of a future ecological reserve. Valverde contacted the CSIC for the purchase of the estate of Las Nuevas, nearby the banks of river Guadalquivir, for the installation of the best research centre in Europe on bird migration. In 1962, the support of the World Wild Fund for Nature meant that 34 million pesetas were available for the purchase of land by the following year. By December 1964, Las Nuevas had already been acquired for more than 12 million. The following year, the Doñana Biological Station was established, with Valverde as director. In 10 years, they had already invested 76 million in infrastructure and in 1969 the Doñana National Park was established, under the direction of the Ministry of Agriculture. In 1973 the CSIC highlighted four major threats to the national park: the future highway from Huelva to Cádiz, the ambitious agricultural plan by the National Institute of Agrarian Reform and Development in Almonte (with the installation of watering crops), the coastal town of Matalascañas and the Aznalcóllar mines. The only one that was finally called off was the interprovincial highway.

Almonte is most well-known for the village of El Rocío (since the late 19th century, the Doñana National Park (the largest nature reserve in Europe), its wide 50 km-length sandy beach (the longest in Spain) and its organic berry industry (one of the top exporters in Europe).

== Demographics ==
Almonte's population boosted in the 60s, when foresters and their families left the forest settlements in the surrounding areas. Another boom started in the 2000s, due to the massive arrival of immigrants from 59 different nationalities, mainly Romania and Morocco. They make up nearly 20% of the total population (almost 5,000 people). Between the November and June, peak season for berry harvesting, the population of Almonte doubles, reaching up to 50,000 people, posing a major challenge for the municipality's health, commercial and security sectors.

Almonte overtook Isla Cristina in 2007, becoming 3rd within the province's population rank, just after Huelva, the capital city and Lepe. Part of this increase is due to Matalascañas, Almonte's summer resort, which has a permanent population of nearly 3,000 people and the village of El Rocío, with around 1,700 inhabitants. Almonte's population increased by 1.19% per year between 2011 and 2014.

During the coronavirus pandemic, Almonte ranked 4th in population growing, just after Huelva, Palos and Lepe. This may have been due to people moving from big cities to the coast, looking for nature and less crowded places. Regarding the transient migrant population, which often goes beyond 15,000 people, cohabitation has developed with relative normality. In 2022 crime rate decreased by nearly 14%, with an average of 62 robberies, 40 burglaries and 3 car thefts; nearly all of them without violence.

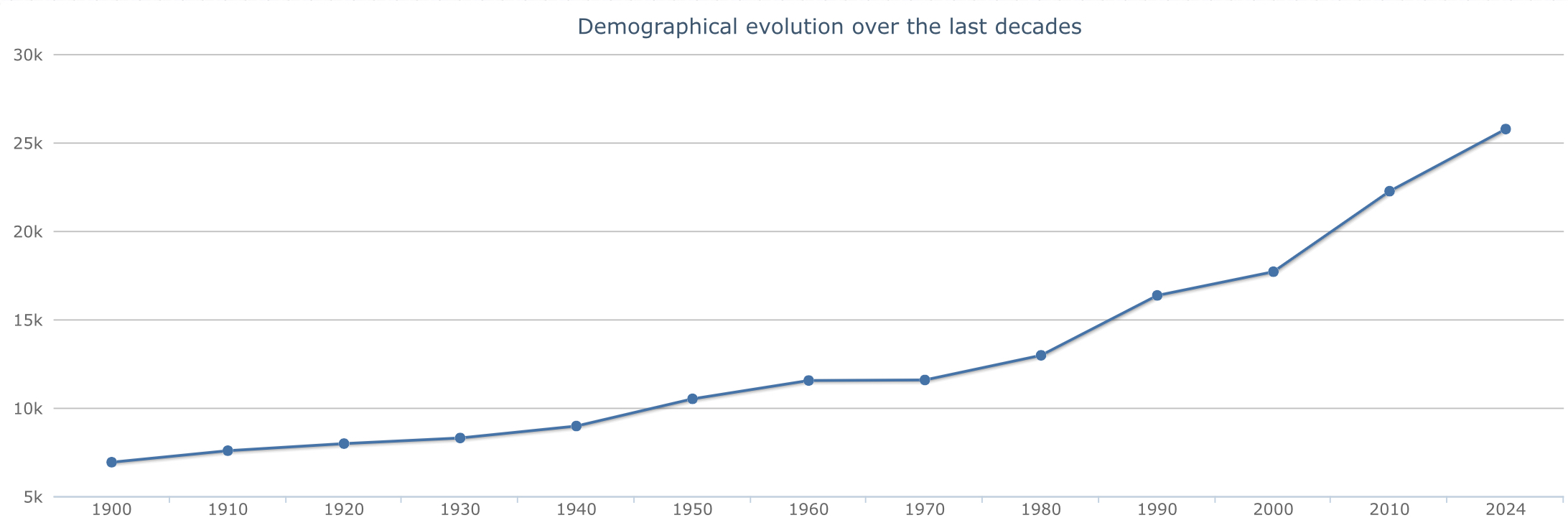
Line graph showing population evolution of Almonte

== Government and politics ==
The council of Almonte is responsible for the three urban areas within its municipality: town of Almonte, village of El Rocío and coastal town of Matalascañas. Having been administered by the Duke of Medina Sidonia over the 18th century, it was from 1812 on that the local council actually played a key role in governing. Local politics have been focused all along the 19th century on seven main fields: public health and order, goods consuming, property, tensions between crop agriculture and livestock farming, wages and hunting.

These concerning public order focused on preventing and punishing people who didn't obey local legislation, hosted foreigners or criminals without reporting, damaged olive trees, used guns or counterfeit money, closed taverns after 10pm, damaged lampposts or had unregistered livestock or unmuzzled dogs. Ordinances regarding public health banned livestock from entering town as well as throwing waste from oil mills or housecleaning on the streets (year 1836). Two years later dilapidated buildings were demolished, illegal wells were covered and obstacles were removed from the streets.

As for goods consuming, a public salt trader is appointed in 1754 and several tax collection offices are opened to regulate oil, wine, vinegar, meat and liquors. Baking was also strictly controlled to avoid any kind of adulterated flour. Within the property field, the acts mention constant reports on pine, vineyard or olive robberies, so most lands are fenced in 1793 and a night watchman and 10 guards are appointed in 1857, two of them riding horses. With the establishment of the Bourbons, crop agriculture was favoured over livestock farming, fuelling complains by horse owners and farmers. The town council regulated wages according to each profession, preventing them from exceeding an established limit (as an example, reapers or horse owners who threshed outside the municipality were often fined or even sent to prison).

Finally, hunting was banned from March to May (1754), as well as poachers. In 1761, an ordinance was passed awarding wolf hunters with 60 reals per wolf, as it was then considered a dangerous predator. In 1831, wolf drives were compulsory in town. It was in the 19th century that a new scientific interest in preserving local flora and fauna arose, although wolves, foxes and even eagles would still be hunted until 1930. In 1858, local Antonio Martín Villa, dean of the University of Seville sent a letter to the town council, begging for a detailed inventory of the wild fauna in Almonte. This register would later contribute to the establishment of the Doñana National Park, currently a World Heritage Site by UNESCO. The following chart includes all the mayors in charge from the 20th century onwards.

Mayor	Date
01. Villa Periáñez, Juan	1899–1903
02. Espinosa Llorente, Francisco	1904–1909
03. Peláez Valladolid, Antonio	1909–1913
04. Villa Báñez, Adulfo	1913–1914
05. Acevedo Medina, Juan	1914–1919
06. Villa Báñez, Adulfo	1919-1923
07. Sancho Espinosa, Ignacio	1923-1926
08. Reales Carrasco, José María	1926-1930
09. Villarán Morales, Francisco	1931-1934
10. Acevedo Valladolid, Manuel	1934-1935
11. López Mojarro, Manuel	1936-1939
12. Cernuda Yllán, Nicolás	1939-1940
13. Redondo Jaldón, Antonio	1940-1941
14. Castellano Pichardo, Juan	1941-1944
15. Carrión Mondaca, Heliodoro	1945-1969
16. Martínez Orihuela, Pedro	1969-1972
17. Villalobos Bernardo, José María	1972-1975
18. Reales Cala, José María	1975-1979
19. Castellanos Ramos, Juan Antonio	1979-1987
20. Diaz López, Rafael Domingo	1987-1991
21. Bella Galán, Francisco	1991-2011
22. Domínguez Iglesias, José Antonio	2011-2015
23. Espinosa De La Torre, Rocío	2015-2019
24. Castellano, Rocío del Mar	2019-2023
25. Bella Galán, Francisco	2023-

=== Local government ===
Almonte's local government is made up of 21 councillors. Since democracy was established in 1978, PSOE is the one which has been in power for the longest time, while mayor Francisco Bella was its party chair. After two decades of political stability with Bella, who won in a five-term streak, there were two terms in which political parties of opposite ideologies teamed up to prevent Bella from regaining the government, even though he won the elections again. From 2011 to 2015, right-wing PP ruled with the cooperation of left-wing IU. The latter, at a regional level, sanctioned the two councillors who made it possible for PP to govern Almonte. In 2019, Bella won the elections again, this time with Ilusiona, his new political project. 61.63% of the adult population voted (10,153 people). There were 6,321 abstentions (38.7%). Ilusiona was the most voted party, with 3,513 votes, followed by PSOE (2,154) and PP (1,403). These two opposite parties and local party Mesa de Convergencia teamed up and Mesa's candidate, with only 2 out of the 21 councillors, was invested mayoress. In the 2023 elections, Bella got a clear majority of votes, achieving a historical assignment of 12 councillors, which will allow him to lead a stable government that has an opportunity to manage such a demanding and complex administration as that of Almonte.

Owing to its extension and population increase over the second half of the 20th century, the government has faced multiple environmental, economic, social and demographic challenges. These include the waste derived from tourism that ends up polluting the Doñana National Park and its surroundings, including ditches, beaches and woods. During certain holidays, as in the summer, Matalascañas hosts more than 200,000 temporary inhabitants, mainly people from Seville and neighbouring towns, while more than one million people gather at El Rocío when the pilgrimage takes place in May. Almonte's urban core also hosts more than 200,000 people when the Virgin arrives and leaves every 7 years. Being one of the top organic fruit exporters in Europe, many paths, trails and even roads in Almonte are constantly used by all kind of agricultural vehicles of all sizes, make it difficult for hikers and bikers to enjoy nature in certain zones. There are nearly 15,000 seasonal workers as well, and many of them live in shacks or prefabricated modules, also endangering natural spaces. The international protected status of the Doñana National Park brings about constant agreements and polemics between Almonte's local government, regional government of Andalusia, the Spanish government and the European Union, mostly regarding sustainable watering of organic crops, pollution, hunting, etc.

Another main issue in the area is water. In spite of being a humid zone, illegal crops still remain in the area extracting subterranean water from the national park aquifer. Politicians often have to deal with European sanctions and create local legislation to control it. A desalination plant has also been proposed for watering crops and a water councillorship may be created in the near future.

Tourism and transport is another main issue that politics focus on. Being a main regional hub for neighbouring towns regarding work, leisure and holidays, more scheduled intercity transport is needed. Regular bus lines already operate El Rocío and Matalascañas, but there is still need for transport with other towns concerning health services, leisure activities, etc.

In spite of having exceeded a population of 25,000 people, there are only three public health centres in the municipality, the main one in Almonte. Long queues and deficient attention are more frequent over time. The large migrant population contributes to the need of a new healthcare facility in town.

== Urban planning ==
The three urban areas in the municipality of Almonte are quite different from each other regarding urban planning, history and locals due to their geographical situation and founding processes. The main town of Almonte is located in the northern area of its municipal territory, 26 km (16 miles) far from the Atlantic coast. The village of El Rocío is 15 km to the south and finally, the coastal town of Matalascañas is just at the very shore. While the main town has been evolving since its foundation in the 8th century, having narrow cobbled streets in its historic centre and restored buildings, the village of El Rocío has maintained its wide straight unpaved streets, adapted to 19th-century equestrian traffic. Finally, the coastal town of Matalascañas was established in the late 1960s just before the establishment of the Doñana National Park, which surrounds it. It has areas of tall residential buildings due to the limited space available for its elevated summer population. Regarding the town of Almonte, the streets of the city centre were built connecting to the church, a 15th-century building which still keeps an original 8th-century chapel as ancient as the town itself. In the late 19th century, oil lamps were installed and the main square was paved, while the surrounding streets were cobbled.

=== Architecture ===
Until the mid-20th century, the three architectural styles of the town were the houses, oil mills and wineries. The traditional Almontean dwellings has been characterised since the 16th century by having two floors (the second one being lower, called the attic, formerly used to store grain or tools), a gabled roof with hand-made tiles and barred windows, from the most austere to the ostentatious, revealing the social rank of the family. On the façades, there are usually light lines of shadow to emphasise doors, windows or eaves (jambs, plinths, cornices, etc.). Once past the main door (normally located in the centre of the façade and with a threshold), there is usually a hall or vestibule, which gives access to the main living room and the bedrooms. This used to be wide to allow livestock to pass through, although, over time, the animals entered through a back door and the size of the hall was reduced, being exclusively used to receive the guest or for brief neighbourly meetings. The inner back of the house was usually used as a kitchen, dining room and living room and had access to the back patio, where the well, the wash basin and the toilet could be found. Optionally, this patio had a back door (popularly, puerta falsa) towards the street. The foundations used to be compacted with lime, rubble and stones.

Until the 20th century, the simplest houses used to have a single small window in the centre of the upper part of the façade, in the attic, to introduce grain and other products and to ventilate. The walls of the façades were load-bearing with solid brick and a thickness of up to 77 cm, with a coating that was usually plastered with lime mortar and painted white. Gargoyles were rarely used on the drains. The door was usually made of pine and painted in a dark tone, with two folding leaves and one of them divided to keep it half open as a shutter. Optionally they had staves, ataires, a knocker, forged nails and sheet metal at the bottom as a splashback. Regarding the windows, the opening usually ended with a lowered arch or a lintel of wooden beams, optionally embellished with overhangs. Protected by a wrought iron grille, they could have whimsical shapes as the economic level increased, as well as folding glass leaves with shutters or lattices. Finally, the old courtyard usually contained the well, the washing basin, the oven, the toilet and the sheds for the beasts and farming tools. If other farms surrounded it, the access was in the kitchen. If not, it had a direct exit towards the street.

Another architectural hallmark of the town are the towers that characterised the oil mills. When the mills were closed, the devil's doors of these towers were sealed and the olive oil presses, the settling jars, the spindle, etc. disappeared. One of the most notable mills that are preserved and have been restored is the Hacienda de Santa María (18th century). Finally, more than fifty wineries were opened in town. They consisted of several adjoining naves, with brick walls and pillars. The roof was usually made of curved tiles with a Spanish-style wooden truss structure and a large door gave access to the interior through the front gable. The side walls used to have rows of barred windows that allowed ventilation. The different naves are separated by arches. Some wineries that have been restored in the 90s include the Bodega del Conde de Cañete (now Library “Ana María Matute”), the Bodega de los Hermanos Escolar (now the Wine Museum), the Molino de Cepeda (now the Town Museum) and the Bodegón de Serafín (19th century, now the visitor centre).

=== Boroughs ===
The main town of Almonte is located in the northern area of its municipal territory, 26 km (16 miles) far from the Atlantic coast. The village of El Rocío is 15 km to the south and finally, the coastal town of Matalascañas just at the very shore. The urban area of the main town has a current extension of 3.2 km^{2} (1.23 sq. miles) and a perimeter of 10.7 km (6.64 miles). It can be divided into the following districts:

==== The Centre ====
The business and political centre has ended up being located in the north part of town, for the urban area has expanded more quickly towards the south. In this zone there is the town hall (a 17th-century building), the main square and the church (15th century), the museum, the theatre, the library, the music school, the pinacotheca, the main fishmonger's, the court, the "Casino de La Paz" (19th-century social club and restaurant), the post office and the visitor centre.

==== Northern area ====
This northern area has been expanded since the 60s and 70s and has been built around the road that exits town and head towards the northern part of Huelva, a mountain range. There are wide boulevards and wide pavements where many people walk and practice outdoor sport. The main sport centre is located here, with an area of 43,561m^{2}, along with the two high schools, the park "Alcalde Mojarro" (46,500m^{2}), the Wine Museum and the CIECEMA (a scientific centre which includes a high-tech astronomic observatory) and a rubber factory.

==== Western area ====
The western area of town has been growing since the 60s, when the urban area reached and overtook the road A-484 which comes from the west and was meant to end in Cádiz, turning a section of that road into an avenue called "Carretera del Rocío". This has become the main business street, being more than 1 km long and almost 30 metres wide. A roundabout with a statue of Alfonso X "The Wise" on top was installed in the late 2000s, breaking gridlock that worsened at rush hour with people getting in and out the town centre. Many restaurants, digital shops and other businesses have been opened in this avenue. The western zone also includes the health centre and several monuments like the one devoted to historian Lorenzo Cruz, the Winery Chimney Tower, the Discovery of America, the Bulls and the Sea Gate, the "Fuente de las Damas" park (which includes the Centro Cultural de la Villa and a monument of an oil mill), two of the 5 petrol stations in the municipality and the bus station.

==== Eastern area ====
This area starts at the roundabout with the Monument to the Mares and includes the fairground, the Plaza de España square, the Padel centre, the Official Language School, the Flamenco school and the elderly's care home. Many grocery shops, cafés and other businesses are also here. It has wide streets with tree-covered pavements. It ends with the morgue and cemetery, 1 km far from town and road A-474 towards Seville.

==== Southern area ====
This is the area which has been growing the fastest. It includes the industrial estate "El Tomillar", with around 150 multipurpose units, another sport centre, a petrol station, the "Blas Infante" and the "Clara Campoamor" parks and a centre for public access to the Internet. This district is especially crowded in spring, during the pilgrimage of El Rocío, since its main street "Camino de Los Llanos" leads the way out of town towards the village of El Rocío. It is also a hot spot during the arrivals and leaves of the Virgin of El Rocío every seven years.

==== El Rocío and Matalascañas ====
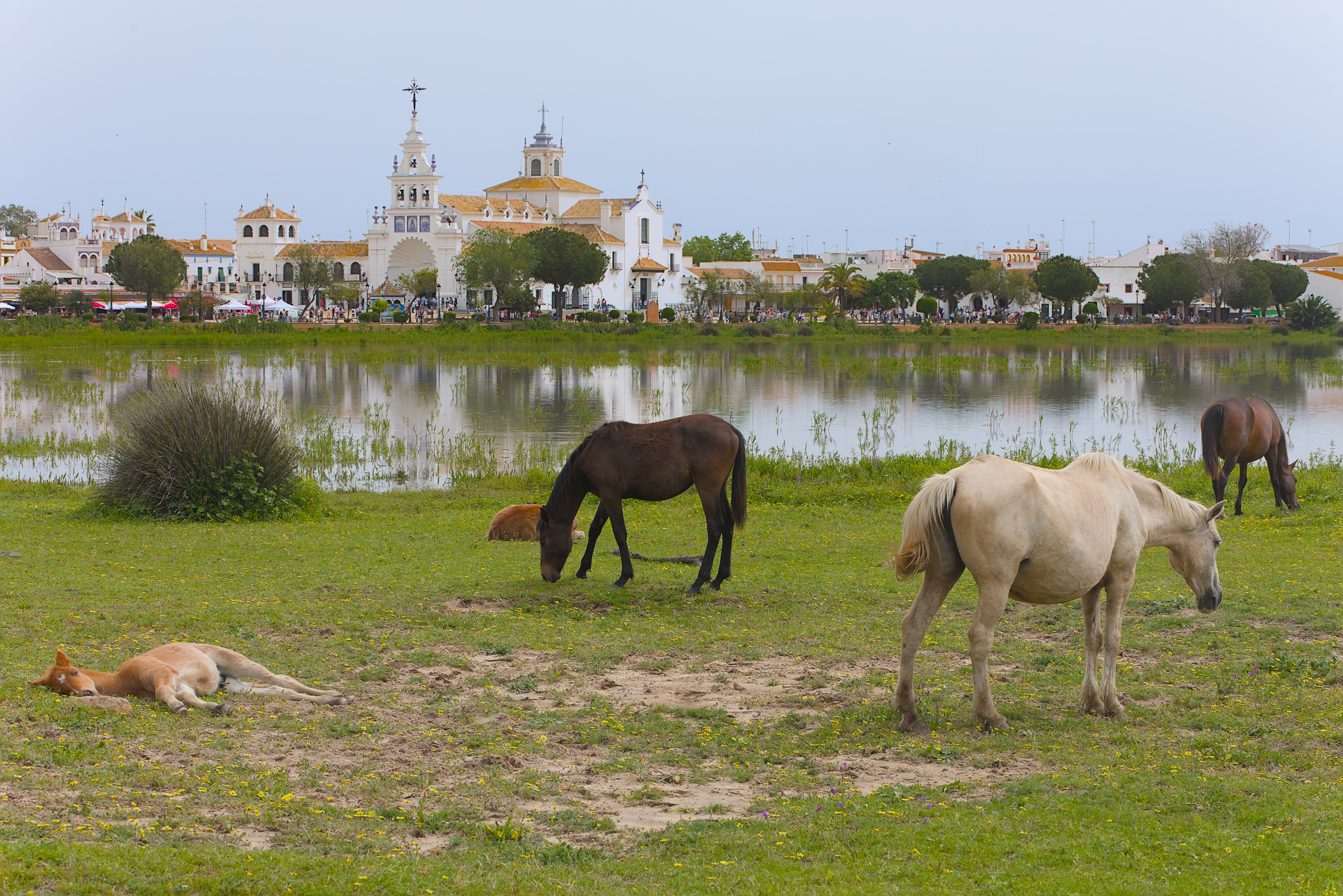
View of the Hermitage from the southwest

The village of El Rocío, 15 km to the south, is a rectangular unpaved town next to a marsh, just in the limits of the Doñana National Park. All the streets are straight, except for the ones surrounding the sanctuary in the southern part. It has little more than 1,000 permanent inhabitants and basic services of education, health, police, etc. Its architectural style and horse culture were brought over to the American Wild West during the Age of Discovery. A large new hospital will have been installed in the northern part of town by summer 2025, replacing the field hospital that used to be set up and closed down each year during the pilgrimage. This hi-tech facility will include headquarters for firefighters, police, environmental workers and many other emergency and security services. With an area of 8,600m^{2} and an investment of more than €4 million, it will become one of the most important health and security centres in Europe. In 2024, The Washington Post released an article depicting the village and its worldwide-known pilgrimage, titled "The Seductive Village where the past feels present". It describes the romantic, literary and folk side of the pilgrimage and the unique natural landscapes, including an extensive photo gallery.

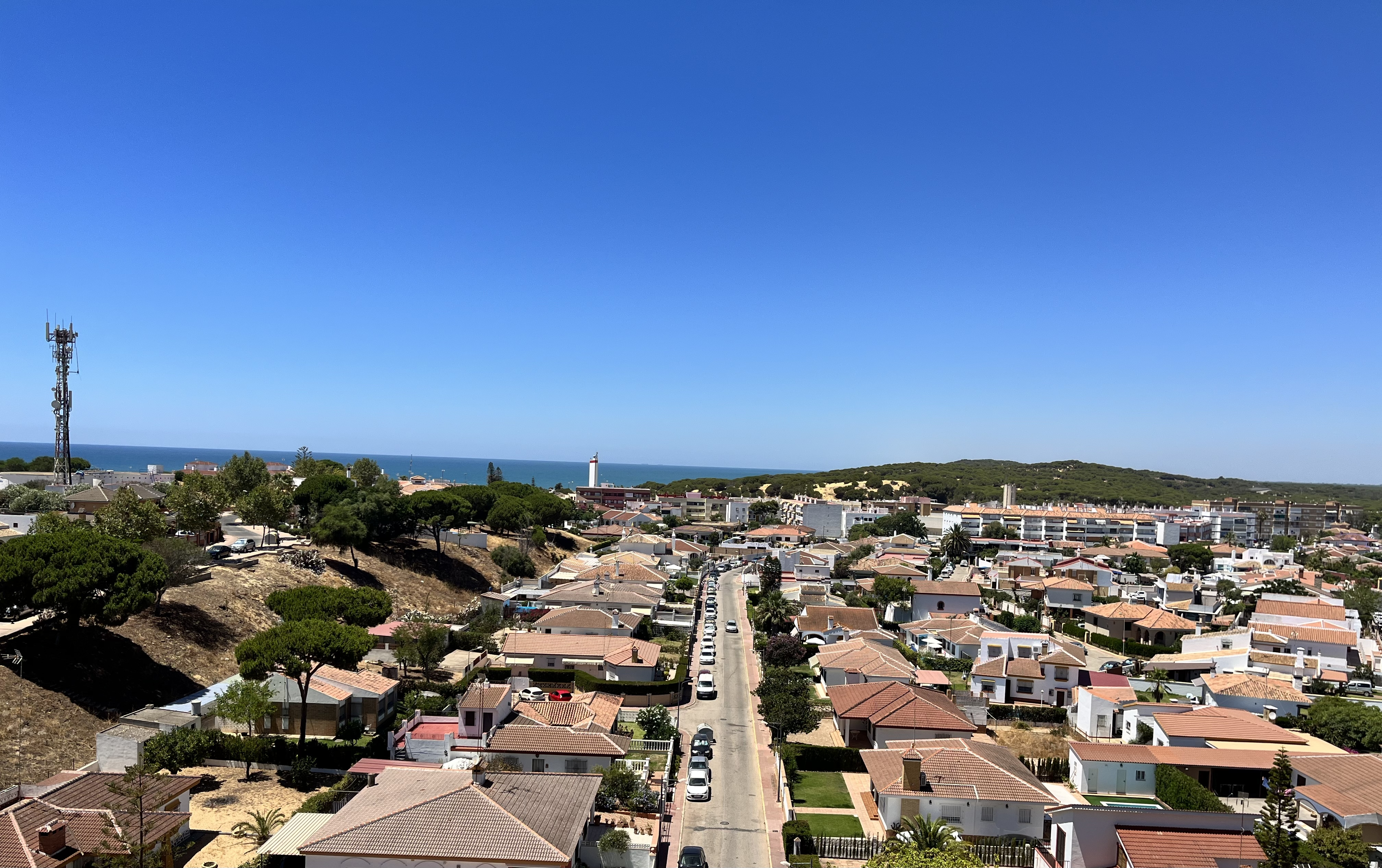
A district of Matalascañas (Almonte)

Finally, 26 km south from Almonte, in the Atlantic coast, the town of Matalascañas was built during the late 60s. It consists of an urban area 4 km long and 1 km wide along the coast. Around 3,000 inhabitants live here permanently. From west to east, it starts with a lighthouse and the business centre. It consists mainly of detached one-floor houses with big gardens and swimming pools, most of them are taken for rent during the summer holidays. There are also tall residential flats, many 4-star hotels and restaurants, a golf course and wide turf spaces with a cycle lane throughout town. The lighthouse stands out for its unique triangular shape and was installed in 1994. It's 24 meters high and was included by the Spanish national newspaper El País in its list of the 10 most beautiful lighthouses.

== Geography ==
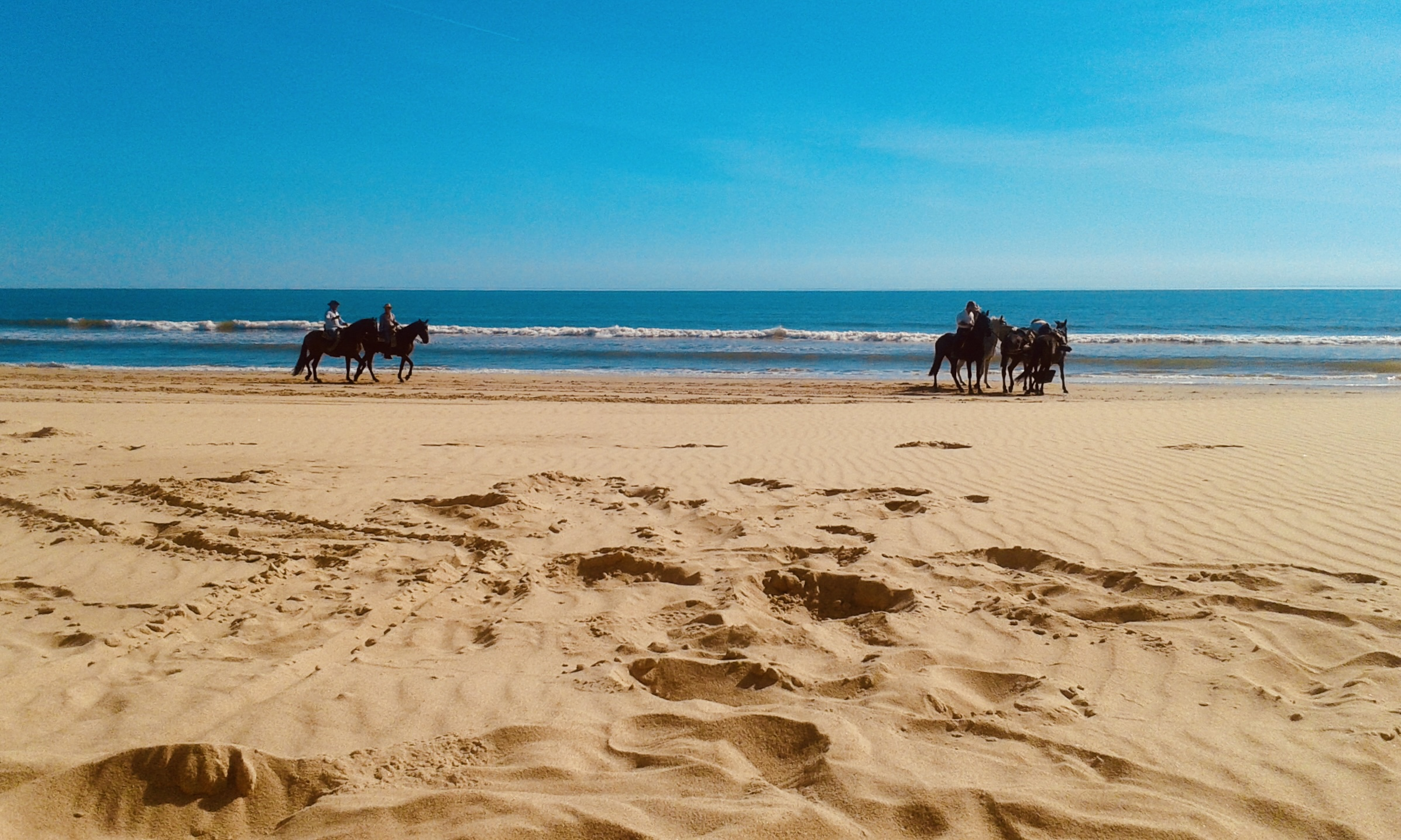
Horses in Almonte's beach

Almonte, as a municipality, is one of the largest in Spain and is located in southeastern Huelva, as part of the Costa de la Luz, which stretches from the Guadiana River to Tarifa, the southernmost point in Spain. Almonte's coast is the longest in Spain, with a 50 km straight uninterrupted sandy beach, from the archaeological ruins of the Torre del Río de Oro (literally, Tower of the Gold River) up to the Guadalquivir River. 28 of these 50 kilometers are protected as part of the Doñana National Park, and only 4 are urbanised, the ones at Matalascañas resort. Most of this coast is made up of semi-fossil dunes with low vegetation, without any rocky structure or cliff. The sand is light in colour and fine. However, along several kilometers between Torre del Río de Oro and “Cuesta Maneli”, a 100-metre high dune cliff can be found. It's called El Asperillo and it's the highest dune cliff in Europe, declared a Natural Monument of Andalusia.

Almonte is bordered by Bollullos Par del Condado to its north, Hinojos to its east, river Guadalquivir and Sanlúcar de Barrameda to it southeast, Rociana del Condado and Moguer to its west and the Atlantic Ocean to its south. It is located in the northern part of its municipality, 15 km (9.3 mi) north from the village of El Rocío and 26 km (16 mi) from its coastal town, Matalascañas.

=== Aquifer, rivers and drainage basins ===
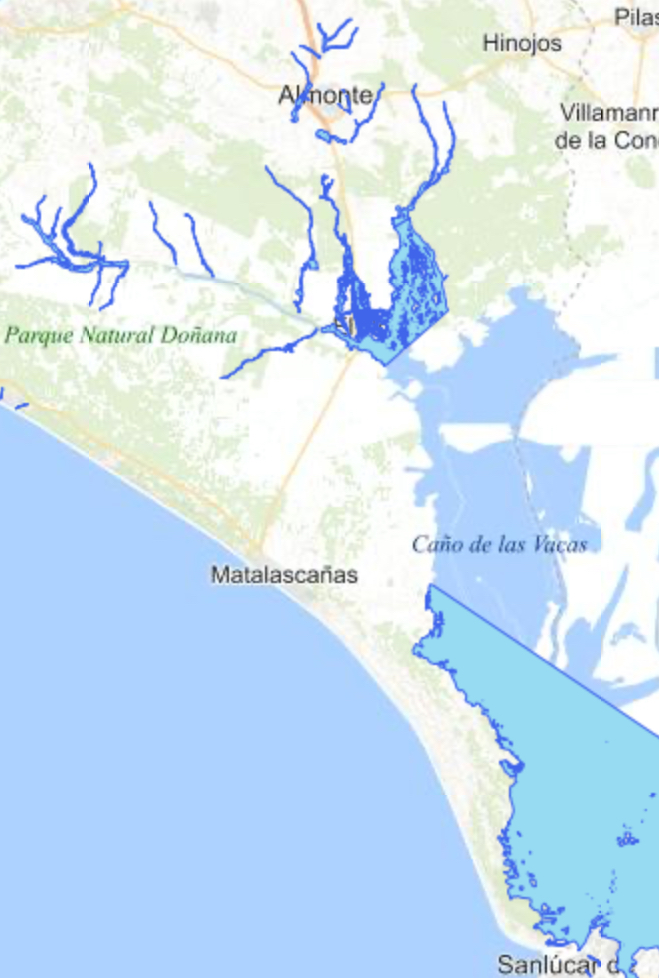
Flooding risks areas of Almonte

Aquifer Almonte-Marismas is the most extensive one in the province, covering more than 2,800 km^{2} (1,100 sq mi) and being up to 150 m (490 ft) in depth and, therefore, the main water source of the Doñana National Park. It's a porous detrital system formed around 11 million years ago, during the Tortonian (late Miocene). It has both unconfined and confined areas under the marshes. Clay layers alternate with detrital ones covering a deep blue marl layer that lies beneath.

It belongs both to the Guadalquivir and the Atlantic Ocean drainage basins, has no saltwater intrusion and provides watering for 22,000 hectares of crops. There are three main rivers and a lake in Almonte: Santa María, La Rocina, Madre de las Marismas and lake Santa Olalla. The first one flows from the northwestern part of the territory, next to local road HU-4200, as an extension of streams El Saltillo and Rioseco. It bypasses the main town of Almonte by its west side and goes on to the south until it merges into river La Palmosa, which flows into the main marsh of El Rocío. La Rocina has its roots in the westernmost part of Almonte's territory and serves as main source for the above-mentioned marsh.

The marsh gets full between October and July, being merely a wetland or even a meadow during the driest months. This mass of water connects to the southeast to a river called Madre de las Marismas, which flows into Guadiamar, a tributary to main river Guadalquivir. Finally, Santa Olalla lake is barely 2 km from the Atlantic shore, in the dunes of Doñana National Park. Several centuries ago, there were dozens of rivers and streams in Almonte, like San Bartolomé, after which the homonym prehistoric settlement was named. The regional government has considered all the above-mentioned bodies of water flooding risk areas.

The main river mouth, which connects to the eastern part of the main marsh is forming a shoal that has threatened it over the last decades and may bring about the complete siltation of the marsh, one of the main emblems of Almonte. That's why the local government has lately been denouncing this situation.

=== Climate ===
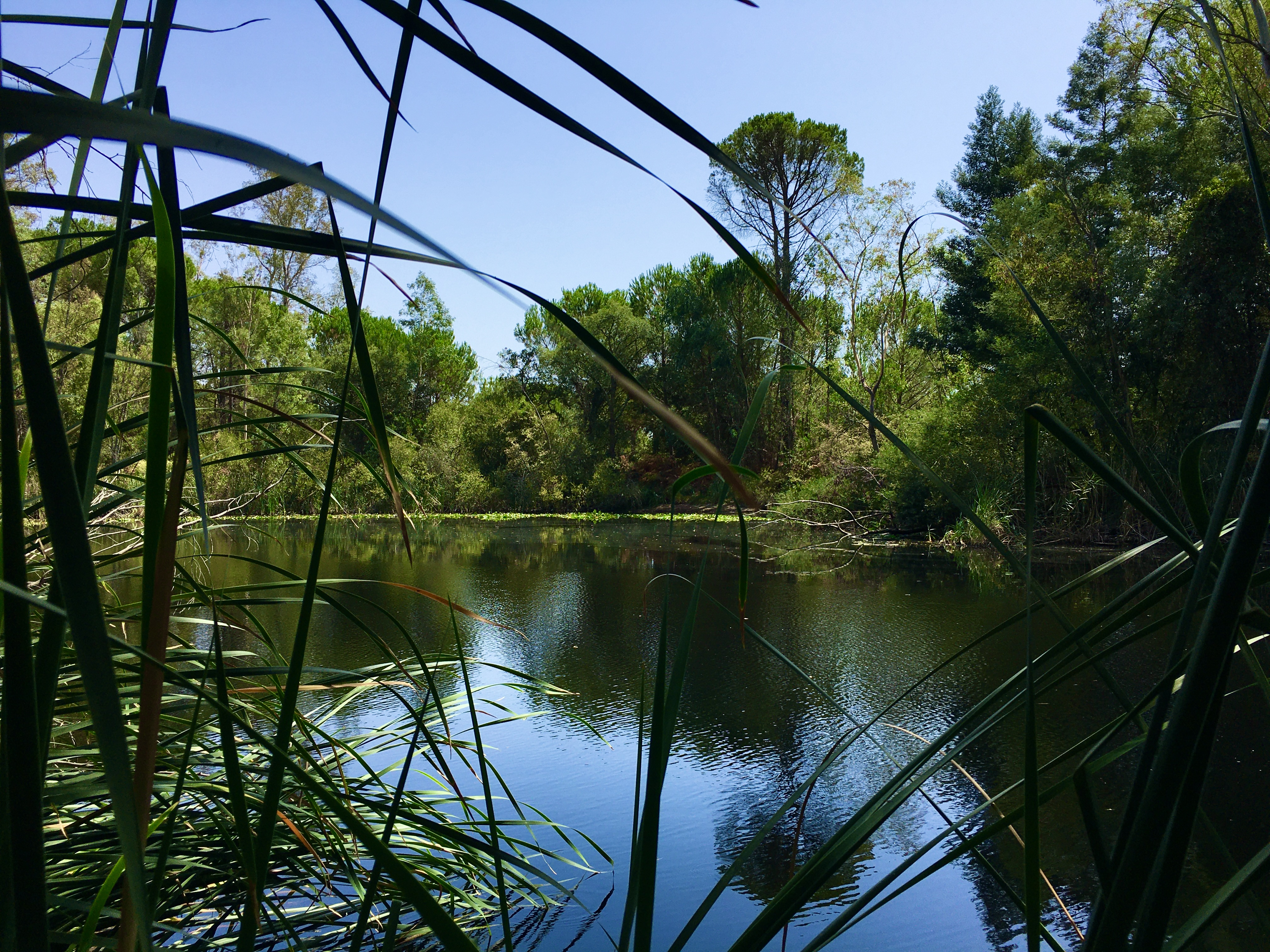
"La Tahona" lake

This area has a combination of mediterranean and oceanic climate, due to its location near the limits of the Atlantic Ocean and the Mediterranean Sea. Given its large size, it has a variety of microclimates and an average temperature of 17 °C (62.6 °F). It has warm summers and winters, without the extreme variations that can be found in landlocked provinces of Spain. Rain is infrequent, barely reaching 700mm a year.

Within Doñana, there is certain humidity in winter and little rain in summer, being a spot where polar fronts interact with subtropical high pressures. In Spring and Autumn, torrential rain may occur, while anticyclones may appear in winter.

Even though Almonte's average temperature is mild due to oceanic influence, there are heavy storms on the coast during winter which leave important damages to the seafront structures, like restaurants and pavements. The council spends large quantities of money to rebuild certain zones, sometimes more than a million euros.

Climate data for Almonte, Spain
Month	Jan	Feb	Mar	Apr	May	Jun	Jul	Aug	Sep	Oct	Nov	Dec	Year
Mean maximum °C	15.2	16.6	19.2	21.5	25.7	30.8	33.8	34.1	29.7	24.6	18.6	15.6	23.80
Mean daily minimum °C	6.2	6.9	9.1	11.1	14.3	18.5	20.6	21.2	18.5	15	7.3	7.6	13.25
Average precipitation mm	54	27	58	56	35	8	1	3	27	75	60	78	505
Mean daily minimum °F	43.2	44.4	48.4	52.0	57.7	65.3	69.1	70.2	65.3	59	45.1	45.7	55.85
Average precipitation inches	2.1	1.1	2.3	2.2	1.4	0.3	0.0	0.1	1.1	3.0	2.4	3.1	19.9
Average precipitation days	5	4	5	5	0	0	0	0	3	6	5	5	38
Source: Climate Data

==== Environmental policies ====
Almonte was the first town to sign the Environmental Treaty (Carta por la Sostenibilidad) back in year 2000, which was later ratified by the Spanish prime minister and has since affected local policies, including the urban plans. It's also a founding member and hosts the headquarters of Amuparna (association of territories affected by national parks), created in 1997 and which has almost 100 members from all over the country. The town has therefore led technological and social fields regarding environmental policies since the 90s, focusing on the Doñana National Park. Examples of these measures include landmarks such as the sea museum (first centre in Spain to be certified with ISO 9001, 14001 and AENOR, the first green golf course in Europe, the most extensive organic crops in Spain and important subsidies to traditional dryland farming. Almonte is facing an environmental challenge at a European level since the establishment of the Doñana National Park in the 60s. This issue has become even more controversial since the 90s, when the berry fields were established. UNESCO has recently warned Spain about Doñana's withdrawal from the organisation if more watering crops are regularised.

Almonte received an investment of more than 170 million euros in 2022 to build PV panels. These will be installed by American company Matrix Renewables and Spanish Rolwind, with more than 115,000 cutting-edge photo-voltaic cells which will make the area get on top position regarding renewable sources at a European level.

In 2022 the Spanish government announced an investment of more than 365 million euros to restore part of the Doñana National Park. The meeting between the Minister of Environment and the council of Almonte was held at theatre Salvador Távora on 30 November 2022. The plan will focus on watering, biodiversity, territory and environmental awareness. Besides, the Regional Government of Andalusia announced an investment of 900 million euros exclusively for sanitation and drainage.

=== Flora and fauna ===
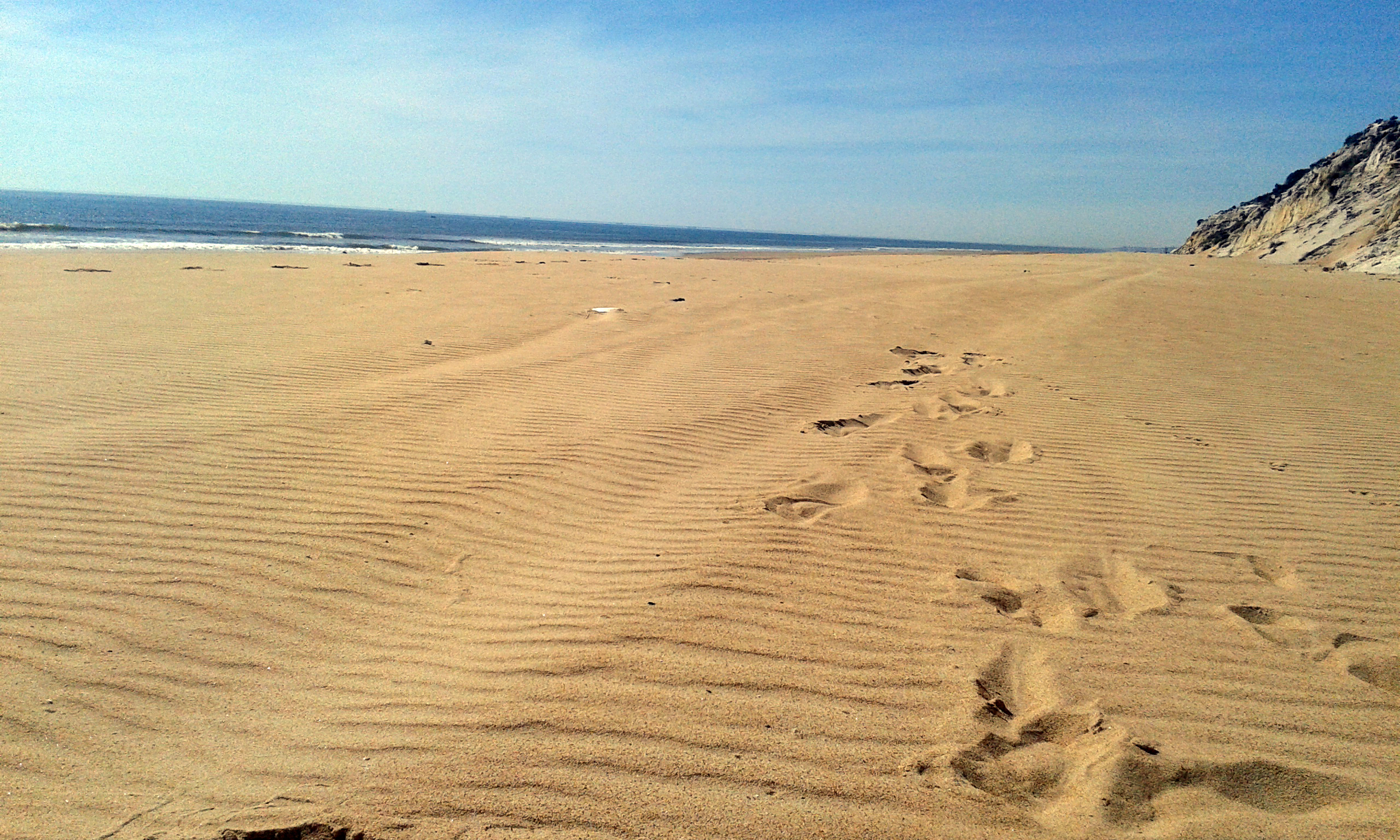
Low tide in Almonte

In the Doñana National Park and its surroundings, several species, including endangered ones, can be found. Regarding flora, there is typical mediterranean scrub (sabins, bulrush, eucalyptus, pines, reeds, wattles, cork oaks, ferns, crowberries, palmettos, sedges, rosemary, brooms, thyme, junipers).

Fauna includes the precious Iberian lynx, deers, wild boars, foxes, herons, mongooses, rabbits, ducks, eagles, hawks, griffon vultures, eels, pikes, snakes, lizards, and chameleons.

Likewise, there are extensive areas of pine repopulated in the 1950s and of underbrush (with rockrose and multiple species of aromatics). Throughout its 122,000 hectares, microclimates and very different areas appear, from jungles in the purest tropical style to desert dunes, including wetlands, beaches, meadows, etc. Almonte was declared in July 2022 “Hub of European Biodiversity” by the World Biological Corridor, an international project with scientists, universities and different organisations involved.

== Culture ==
Almonte has been inhabited since prehistoric times. Its territory reached the Atlantic coast during the Middle Ages. Over the centuries the area was settled or ruled by the Tartessians, Greeks, Phoenicians, Romans, Visigoths and Muslims, and later by the Crown of Castile. The El Rocío pilgrimage takes place in the municipality every year, and in 2022 it was forecast to draw more than one million people. The King and Queen of Spain attended a ceremony in Almonte in February 2020. Spanish prime ministers have also used an official residence in the municipality for holidays.

=== Historical heritage ===
From the Bronze Age to modernity, a wide variety of historical elements can be found in Almonte. They include the following:

==== Holocene fossil footprints and marks ====
In the coast of Almonte, nearby dune cliff El Asperillo, several extinct ungulate's tracks were found on the clay substratum that lies beneath the sand. They date back from 150,000 - 300,000 BC. It is the most important Fossil track site in the world, both for its size (more than 250 footprints found) and its age (there are only two similar sites worldwide, the one at Biache-Saint-Vaast (France) and Theopetra Cave (Greece). It's also the first fossilised flamingo footprints discovered in Europe. They can be observed only when the tide is low and the sand moves back. There is an environmental association called "Parque Dunar", which organises free guided tours that include historical and geological commentaries and a voluntary litter collection. In a recent research published by Quaternary Science Reviews and carried out by the University of Huelva, it has been confirmed that the humanoid footprints belong to Neanderthals.

==== Neolithic remains next to the bridge Puente de los Olivarejos ====
Next to a bridge over Santa María stream, around 1 km south from town, an area of around 2.47 acres (1 hectare) containing Neolithic tools and structures was accidentally exhumed during the building of a pipeline to transport gas across Andalusia. It dates back from 5,000BC and includes adobe huts, axes, spoons and crystalline and rocky minerals like quartz or silex.

==== Prehistoric whistle ====
In January 2024, researchers from the Doñana National Park and the Spanish National Research Council discovered a prehistoric musical instrument half buried at the shore of Santa Olalla lake. It was later identified as a Turdetani whistle dating back from 2,000BC. It is made of terracotta and has the shape of a woman. It is thought to have been used either to provide musical content to ancient rituals or as a way of instructing patterns when hunting

==== Tartessian metallic remains ====
As mentioned in the history section, there are remains of a settlement of 40 hectares, with pottery and metallic tools (gold, silver, cupper and lead) nearby the San Bartolomé stream, as well as a 3-metre high oven. Almonte was one of the two main silver producers and traders in the area, along with Huelva.

==== Roman fishing factory at Cerro del Trigo ====
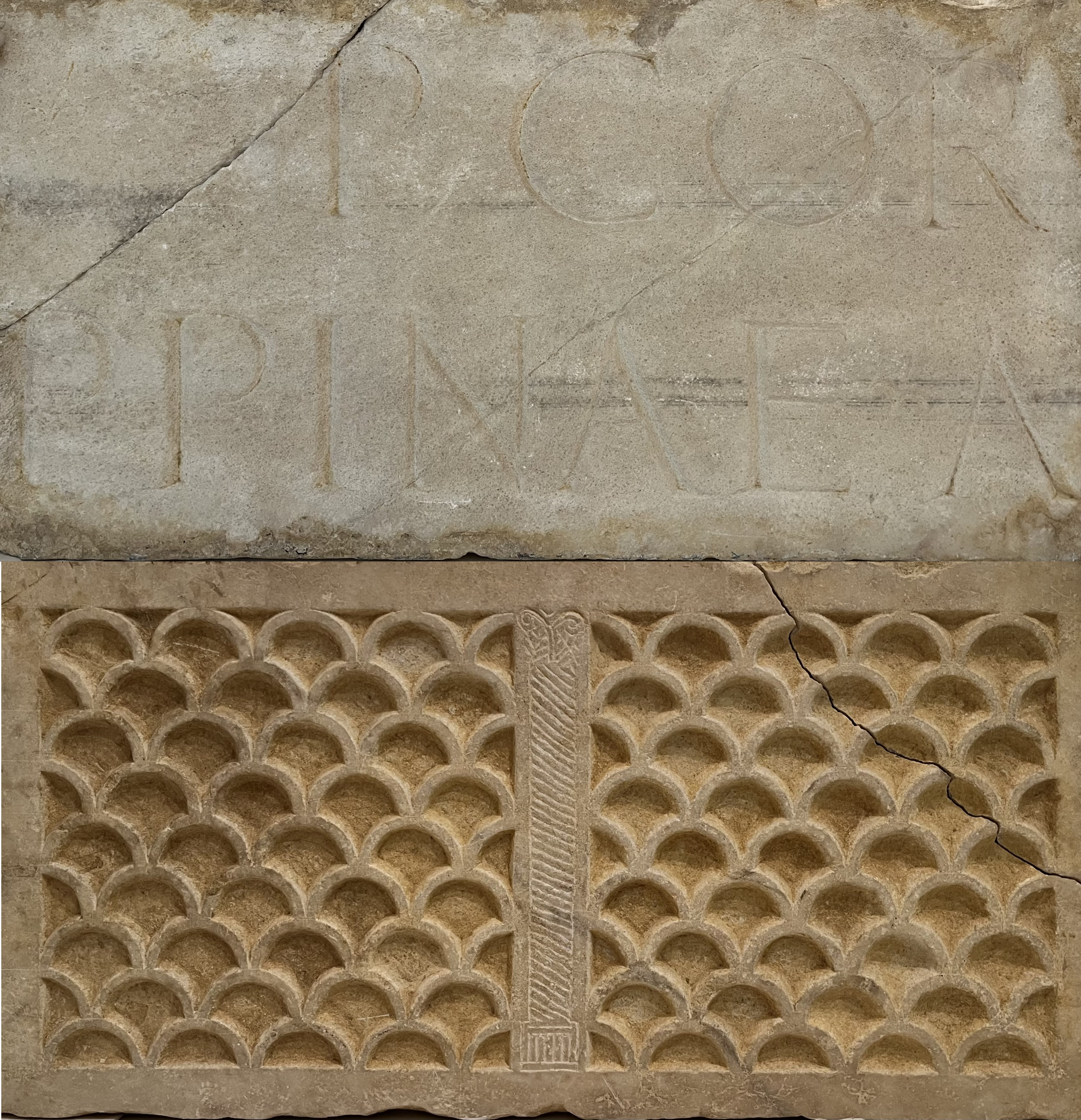
Roman marble stone found in Almonte with Latin inscription (up) and carved back side (down)

These ruins can be observed inside the Doñana National Park. Adolf Schulten and Jorge Bonsor were searching for the legendary capital of Atlantis when they discovered them. But they were overlooked, as the archaeologists were frustrated for not being able to find Atlantis. Scientists from the university of Huelva reaffirmed in 1999 that it was a garum factory from the 2nd century AD, buried 18 feet under a dune. Amphoras and other recipients used to ferment fish could be recovered, being the most important discovery out of the 16 archaeological places found in the coast. Archaeologists are still finding remains today, including ovens and necropolises. Between Almonte and forest settlement Los Cabezudos a 1st-century Roman marble stone was found. It has a Latin inscription which seems to be a dedication to empress Agrippina by Tacitus. The back side is carved with paleochristian decorations.

==== Ancient Olive Trees of El Rocío ====
In the southern part of the village of El Rocío, behind the temple and near the marsh, several the oldest olive trees in the region can be found. They have been preserved and taken care of by locals since ancient times due to their medical, culinary and therapeutic properties. The oldest of the 15 trees, known as El Abuelo(the Grandfather) is regarded as the oldest living being in the Doñana National Park, being around 800 years old.

==== Domigratia's tombstone ====
In the area of La Solana, in the south-west part of the outskirts of town, a multitude of remains dating from the late Roman-Visigoth period were discovered in the 1960s, including amphorae, coins and various utensils. The most notable discovery was a funerary tombstone almost a metre high with a Latin inscription that reads: Domigratia Famula Deis Hic Requiescit In Pace Die No Nonarum Novembriun Annorum Trium Et Plus Minus Mensses Sex; Era DXXXIII (Domigratia, servant of God, rest here in peace on the day of the nones of November, more or less three years and six months, year 533). Once studied, the investigations concluded that it is the tombstone of a girl called Domigratia belonging to a wealthy family, since more remains were discovered of what seemed to be a family necropolis. It is one of the oldest tombstones preserved in the province and the girl turned out to be one of the first inhabitants of Almonte to be baptised into Christianity (the emperor at the time, Theodosius The Great, did not Christianise the Hispanic population until the end of the 4th century. The priest at the time, a romanophile, arranged for the artifact to be kept within the baptismal chapel of the church.

==== Palace of Doñana ====
In southeastern Almonte, deep within the Doñana National Park, the Palace of Doñana can be found. It is a protected 14th-century building which currently serves as an advanced research facility administered by the Spanish National Research Council. It was built as a defesive military watchtower to monitor trading across the province towards the sea and underwent a major remodeling during the 16th century, which gave it a typical Andalusian country-house style. From that moment onwards, it was used as a royal hunting country house. Landowners soon allowed scientists and researchers to use the building, as local interest in archaeology, hydrology, geology, botany and ornithology grew more and more. It became headquarters for the “Doñana Biological Station”, a national research complex administered by the Spanish National Research Council in 1964. Spanish Prime Minister Felipe González first used it as a presidential palace in the 1980s, having it equipped with cutting-edge phone lining and electrical wiring systems and allowing international leaders to visit the park. Currently, the official presidential residence is the Palace of Las Marismillas. The Ministry of Economy and the European Regional Development Fund invested more than €7 million to remodel the entire building, allowing it to be included within “LifeWatch” (e-Science European infrastructure for biodiversity and ecosystem research), along with another 9 sites in Europe. It is currently one of the most advanced scientific clompexes in Europe and can be accessed through an 11.5-km-long path starting at km40 of road A-483, one kilometer north from Matalascañas.

==== Fortified towers along the coast ====
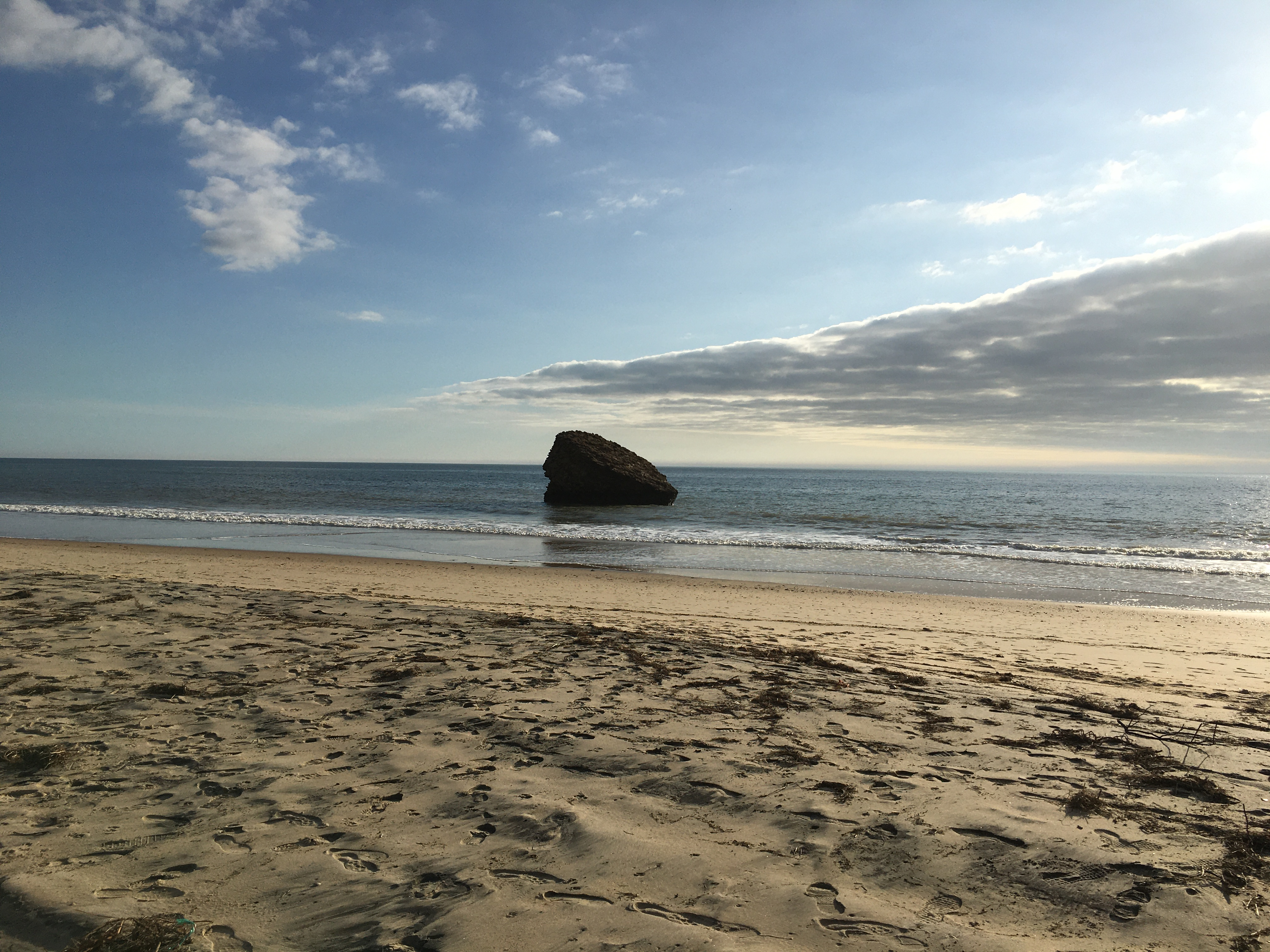
Ruins of Torre de la Higuera

King Philip II of Spain ordered the construction of a series of watchtowers during the 16th century to prevent invasions from the sea, given the multiple wars that Spain was waging at that moment. At least six of these towers are located within Almonte's territory. These are, from east to west: Torre del Río de Oro, Torre del Asperillo, Torre de la Higuera, Torre Carbonero, Torre Zalabar and Torre de San Jacinto. All of them are declared Bien de Interés Cultural, a protected cultural status in Spain. The three first towers are in ruins, while the last three can be observed as they originally were. One of the watchtowers, Torre de la Higuera (literally, "Tower of the Fig Tree") is located at the beginning of the Matalascañas resort and has become a symbol for Almonte, often appearing in postcards and other touristic elements.

==== Church of Almonte ====
The church of Almonte, known as Iglesia de la Asunción stands out as an international touristic landmark for being the only temple (besides the hermitage of El Rocío itself) to host the Virgin of El Rocío. Due to this fact, several notable people, including renowned authors like Juan Ramón Jiménez and monarchs like the King of Spain or Amélie of Orléans have visited the church several times. Moreover, it's one of the few religious buildings in Spain which houses a 6th-century Roman tombstone. It's an outstanding mixture of gothic, mudéjar, baroque and neoclassical styles which has undergone several modifications over centuries. One of the earliest mentions of the modern building was included in the Libro Blanco de la Catedral de Sevilla from 1411. Thus, the current church is a Baroque extension of the original building, from which a chapel containing the Roman tombstone has remained untouched. There may have been a secret subterranean tunnel connecting both buildings, but it was never searched for.

==== Town hall ====
The current town hall is a building whose construction began in 1600 and whose original structure consisted of a single floor, inaugurated in 1612, with the second floor being added six years later, with two entrances from the first floor and a large terrace overlooking the square. The ceiling of the second floor is covered by a vault with the architrave of the platform adapted to its arches, a triglyph frieze and a wrought iron parapet. In 1795, 20.000 reals were invested to begin, at the proposal of the mayor Agustín De Rivas, the work on the inner patio with semicircular arches on marble columns and a central fountain. Also on the third floor, known as the Mirador de las Monjas (nuns’ lookout). This last floor has a wrought iron hipped roof and five elongated windows covered by lattices. The inner patio is porticoed and has tiles representing different local uses and customs and the staircase leading to the upper floor is decorated with the heraldic shields of several renowned families (Abreu, Acevedo, Almonte, Barrera, Bejarano, Cabrera, Domonte, Gauna, Hidalgo, Tello de Eslava, Pichardo, Pinto and Prieto). In 1849, the current exterior enclosure was put in place with wrought ironwork designed by José Ojeda. Gonzalo De Rivas and Miguel de Ojeda were the master carpenters in charge and Basilio García and Juan Benegas were the builders. In 1918, the pillars on the ground floor were replaced by cast iron columns, which are still visible today in the protocol room, along with the walnut wood with its Renaissance style.

This room contains a collection of works of busts and portraits of different illustrious people from Almonte. Also the committee room is worth mentioning, carved from Swedish red pine and containing the former mayor's staff, used by King Juan Carlos I during his visit in 1992. In 1927 the third floor was renovated internally and a mezzanine was added.

In 1967, architect José María Morales directed a new inner renovation and the current appearance is due to the last major renovation in 1995, when the current mayor's office was built. This room contains two flowerpots designed by renowned sculptor Pedro Navia y Campos and the altar where, the Virgin of El Rocío was enthroned in 1755 due to the impossibility of taking it to the church, after the ravages of the Lisbon earthquake. From the 1960s on, with the rise of tourism, the establishment of the Doñana National Park and the increase in population in El Rocío and Matalascañas, the town hall building ran out of space and different municipal offices were opened both in Almonte and in the other urban centres. Social services, tourism, culture, science and many other services are examples of these offices based outside the town hall itself.

==== Palace of Las Marismillas ====
This palace is the only presidential residence in southern Spain. It's located within the Doñana National Park, in the southeasternmost area of Almonte, one kilometer far from river Guadalquivir. It has a 10,000-hectare private land and a British colonial style, with 28 rooms and independent bathrooms. It was opened in 1912 as a hunting country house by the 2nd Duke of Tarifa and in 1998 it became a State-owned property. It was first used as a presidential residence in 1996, having been visited by international leaders such as Angela Merkel, Mikhail Gorbachev or François Mitterrand. Before that year, the official residence for leaders had been the Palace of Doñana.

==== World War II bunkers ====
There are several bunkers from World War II in the shore next to the delta of river Guadalquivir in different coastal points. A programme called "Descubre tus fortalezas" (literally "Discover your fortresses") organises guided tours to these remains, with historians, architects and archaeologists participating. The bunkers were built by order of Franco in 1943 in fear of being invaded by the allied troops during the North African campaign.

==== Almonte's flute and tabor ====
They are part of the musical tradition in Almonte and can be heard at any moment, but especially during the Pilgrimage of El Rocío. The typical flute is called "gaita rociera" and is made of high-quality wood. The drum is called "tamboril rociero" and is typically painted with the Andalusian flag. Handmade one tend to be rather expensive.

==== Wineries and oil mills ====
In the first half of the 20th century, there were 58 wineries and 10 oil mills in Almonte. Many of them have been restored and are currently used as either public offices or museums, restaurants, etc. Others are in ruins, but can be identified by their typical towers. Wineries emerged after the Spanish confiscation, using former religious buildings. During the 60s, Almonte stood out for its solera wine.

==== Palace of El Acebrón ====
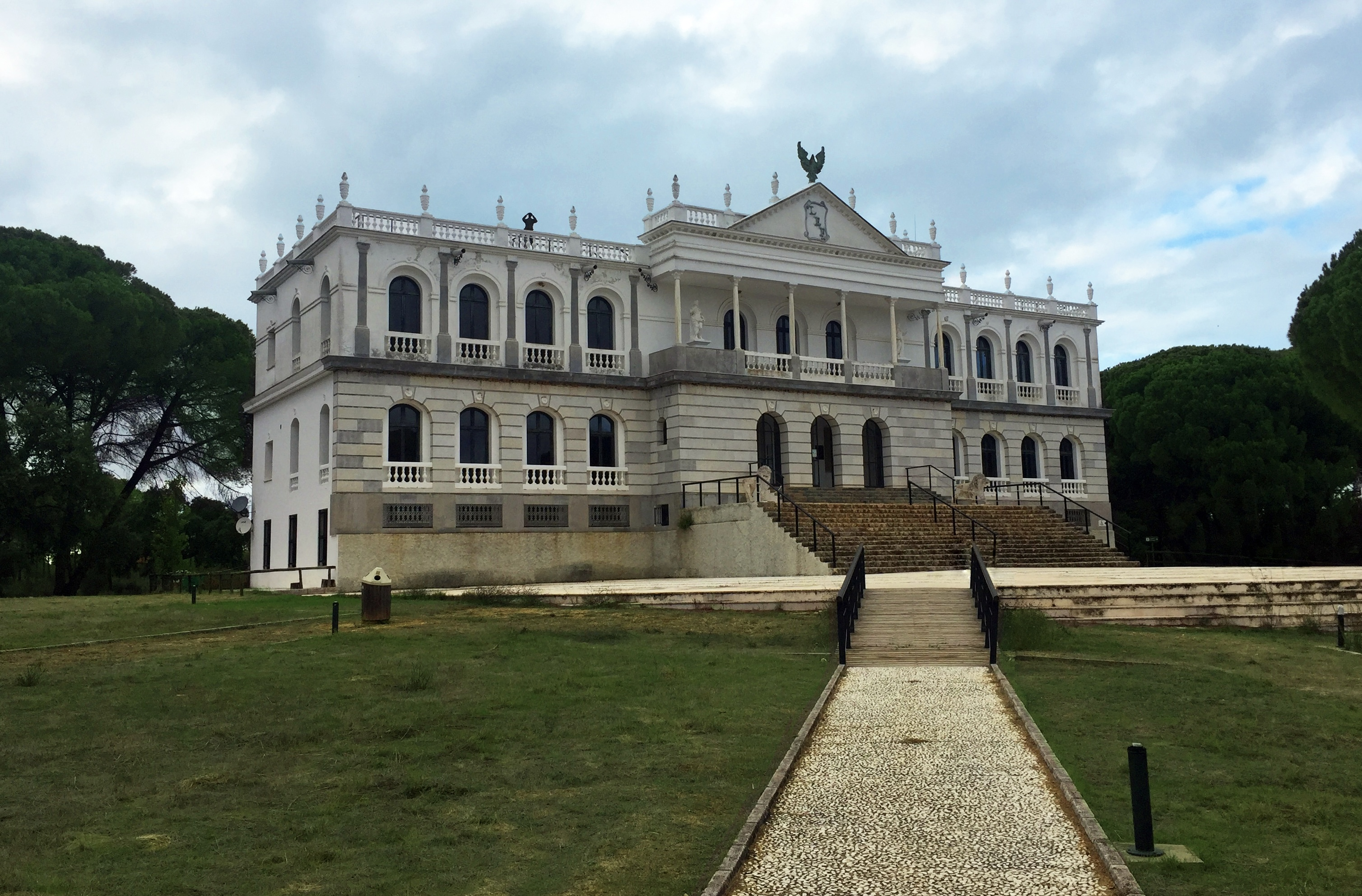
Neoclassical palace "El Acebrón" in Almonte

Nearby the stream of La Rocina, 5 km away from El Rocío, there is a neo-classical palace embedded in the woods, within the surroundings of the Doñana National Park. It was finished in 1961 as the private residence of eccentric aristocrat Luis Espinosa Fontdevila, whose initials are printed in relief on the front. After all the sumptuous parties and expensive works to complete the palace and its garden, he ended up broke, so he sold all the area to the government, which used it to plant eucalyptus and use its wood. The stairs that lead to the entrance door are made of the remains or a Roman road and red marble stairs lead to the second floor. A two-headed eagle decorates the stone chimney. Today it has become a centre for visitors, hosting a museum about the customs of the traditional inhabitants of the area. It includes mockups of the traditional huts and information about hunting, fishing, farming and modern uses of nartural resources. The rooftop terrace offers views of the pine woods. Along with the palace, visitors can hike using a circular wooden path deep within the woods, passing by a lake.

=== Local festivities ===
Almonte celebrates a wide variety of traditional festivities and holidays, many of which are linked to the Doñana National Park and the economic activities carried out over the centuries all along the municipality, from the northern town to the southern coast. Some of these customs date back to the Tartessian age. Although some of the most popular traditions have a religious origin, only a small percentage of the population in Almonte currently declare themselves religious and it is unusual to attend mass, as the average population in Spain.

==== Romería de El Rocío ====
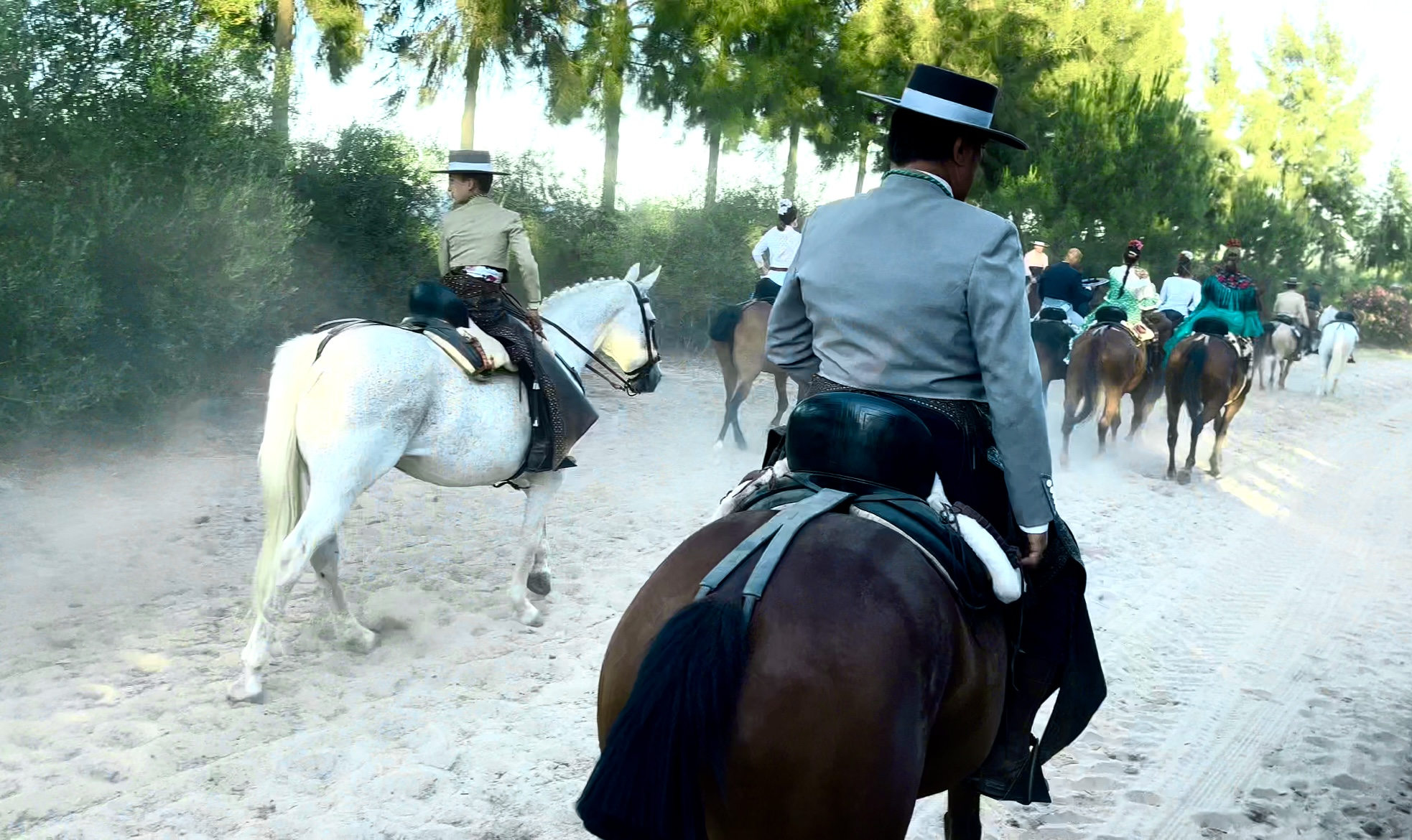
Pilgrimage of El Rocío (Almonte)

It is the most popular holiday in Almonte, declared an International Touristic Holiday by the Spanish government in 1980 and gathering more than one million people in town. These visitors include pilgrims from around 120 national and international filial confraternities, which travel to the temple of El Rocío from different parts of the world, walking or by horse or car, to worship Almonte's patron saint, the Virgin of El Rocío. It is a 12th-century anonymous gothic wooden carved sculpture. From the 60s on, the number of regular visitors boosted, reaching its peak at a religious level with the visit of Pope John Paul II in 1993. In order to successfully organise such a massive event, a security planning called "Plan Romero" has been executed since 1983. These preventive measures are carried out by the town hall, the regional government and Almonte's confraternity in a synchronous way in Seville, Huelva and Cádiz, the three main provinces from which the confraternities come.

It involves more than 6,000 professionals (police, medical services, firefighters, etc.) and AML and GPS technologies, becoming one of the most expensive security deployments in Europe. The confraternities that have been affiliating to Almonte over the last centuries include Madrid (1961), Barcelona (1969), Toledo (1986), Valencia (1991), Gijón (1998), Argentina (1993), Brussels (2000) or Australia (2000s). Besides the religious aspect, there's a strong cultural and festive interest and many visitors who are not into any religious feelings and do not participate in the religious part, in spite of being part of the pilgrimage. There's an environmental interest too, for the last part of the journey to the village is through the Doñana National Park, the largest natural reserve in Europe. The holidays take an entire week for the local people of Almonte, with two key days: Wednesday, when the "Hermandad Matriz" (Almonte's confraernity) makes the pilgrimage from Almonte to El Rocío and Monday, when the Virgin is taken out from the temple to tour the village.

==== La Venida de la Virgen ====
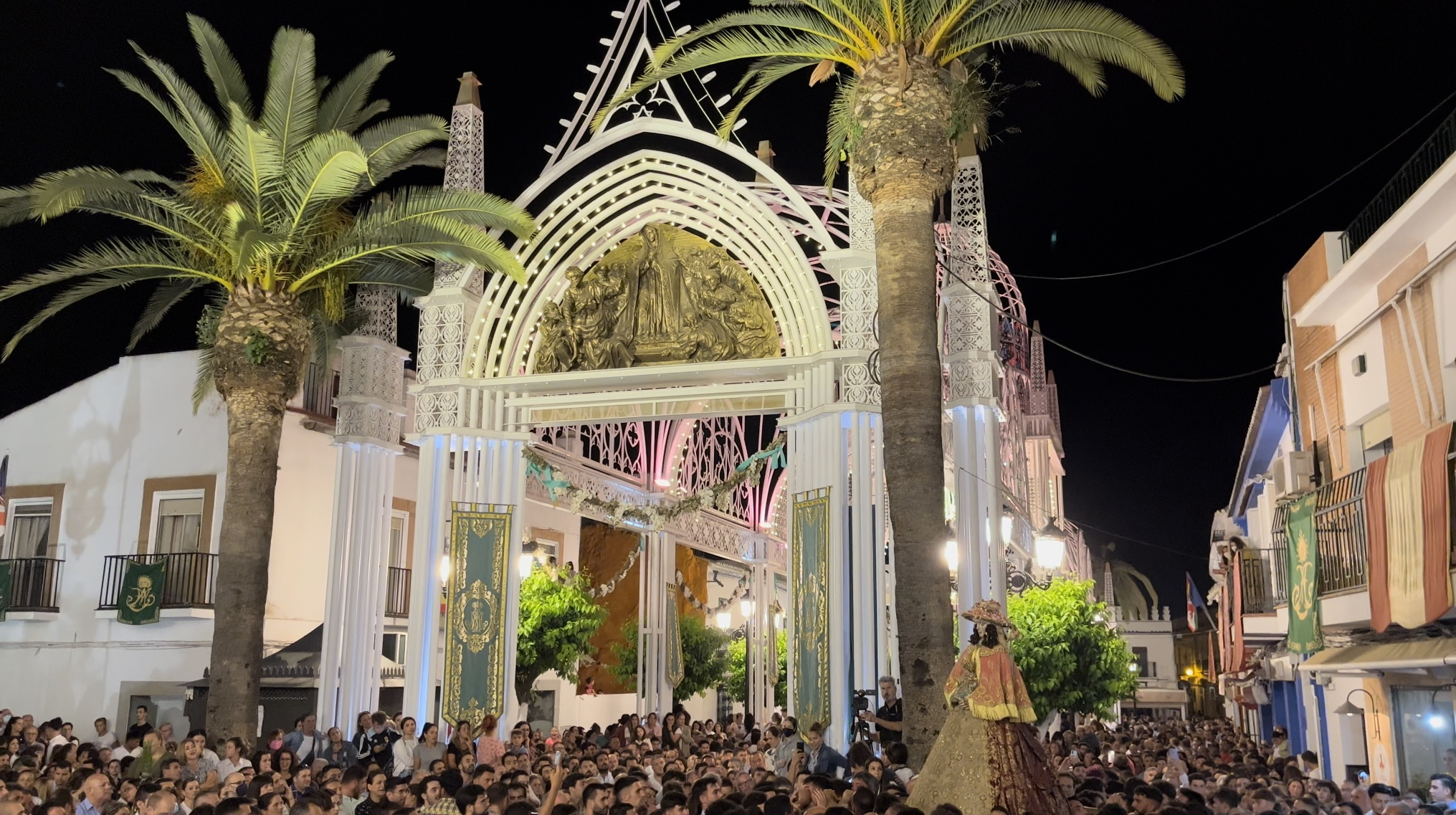
Almonte's town square during one of the tourings of the Virgin

From 1589 on, the virgin has been taken from El Rocío to Almonte on a round trip each 7 years, staying in Almonte for 9 months. During these months, it tours the streets twice, after the arrival and then before leaving. The streets of Almonte are decorated with handmade white flowers and many lights, rosemary and fronds and arches. A huge structure called "Ephemeral Cathedral of Almonte" is also built on the main square. Nearly 200,000 people gather in the town during these special days when the Virgin tours the streets. The places involved in the route are completely closed to traffic and the entire town gets under a kind of siege with high security measures involving police, Civil Guards, firefighters, helicopters and ambulances and EMS personnel ready and prepared to respond. Although originally a religious event, it is now a leisure festivity that brings a great economic benefit to the town, with dozens of businesses temporarily becoming pubs, cafés and restaurants exclusively during the nine months that the Virgin remains in town.

The latest round trip is in 2026-27.

==== Saca de las Yeguas ====
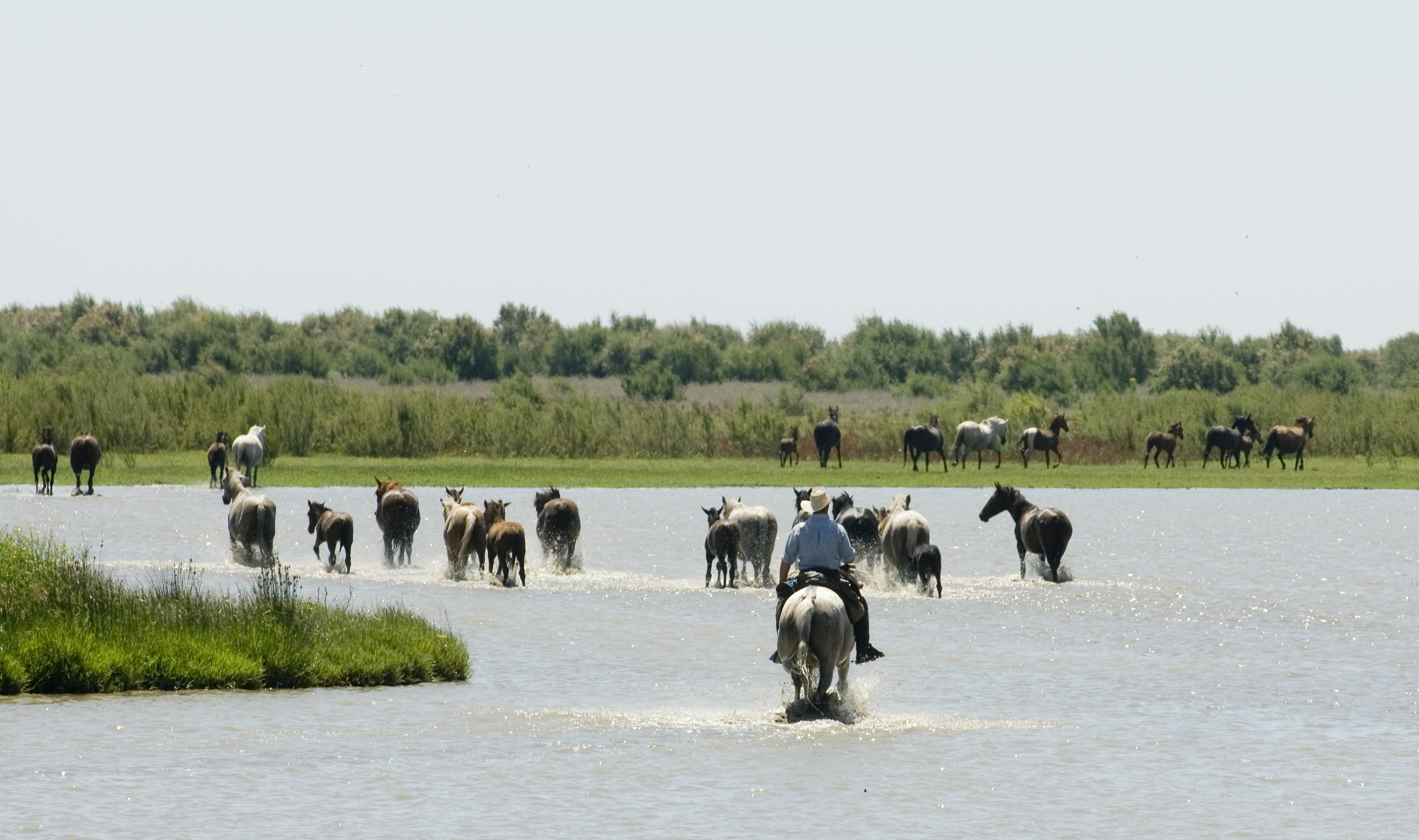
Gathering of feral horses in Almonte

Also called “The Gathering of the Mares”, it is an annual livestock event that has been celebrated in Almonte for more than 500 years (several centuries before the creation of Doñana), being a local emblem. It takes place every 26 June, just before the fair and often involves thousands of horses. It can be divided into 5 different stages: 1. Collecting and gathering inside the national park: the breeders, horsemen called yegüerizos get deep into the Doñana National Park to gather the semi-feral horses and take them out from the woods, swamps, meadows and marshes. 2. Parade around the Hermitage of El Rocío: in late morning, the herds are guided towards El Rocío, where they parade and get exhibited to crowds of tourists and locals. 3. Sesteo (nap): once they've left the village, they are taken to Almonte, 15 km up north, having a short rest in the pine woods, nearby the Santa María stream and getting organised before entering town. 4. Parade across Almonte: around 7pm, the herds crowd the streets of Almonte and are taken to the livestock enclosure Huerta de la Cañada, a fenced outdoor area in the northern outskirts of town. 5. Livestock event: next day, “la tusa” is carried out, which is the process by which the horses are cleaned, chipped and sheared in order to be sold. The following days the town fair is held and several activities are carried out regarding the horses. These include a morphological evaluation of the royal pattern of the mares and new foals of the ancient Marismeño breed, which is endangered and genetically related to the American Mustang horse. There are also photo contests and a horse race. When the fair ends, the horses which have not been purchased get back to the wild.

==== Feria de Almonte ====
It is an annual event whose origins can be traced as back as horse breeding and cow farming itself, around the 13th century. It was in 1872 that the fair was officially established as "Feria de San Pedro", held in the last days of August until 1896, when it was brought forward to June, so that it coincided with Saint Peter's day, as he's the patron saint of Almonte. The fair holidays take five days, just after the Gathering of the Mares has finished at the livestock enclosure, for the fair has a farming trade origin. The fair is held at the "Recinto Ferial", a trapezoidal area of 30,000m^{2} locally known as "El Chaparral", located in the town's eastern zone, with paved, unpaved and turf zones.

Around 22 casetas with an average area of 400m^{2} are built, leaving five main temporary streets, including the main one or "Real". In the northeast part, different amusement rides for all ages are installed, including ferris wheels, rollercoasters, dodgems, pendulums, merry-go-rounds, drop tower, funhouses, tagadas, etc. The fair is typically inaugurated by an artist or celebrity, sometimes nationally recognised, like singer Rocío Jurado. Almonte's fair is the only one in Andalusia which has not got a flamenco dress code, but a smart casual one. that has because flamenco dresses in Almonte are reserved for El Rocío. The fair typically ends with some livestock show. All these particularities make it gather people from many neighbouring towns.

==== Transition Festival ====
It is an international alternative music festival launched in 2011 and held deep within the pine woods, 4 km southeast from Almonte. It is typically celebrated on the second week of May. Nature, music and art merge at a unique event which attracts people from all ages and nationalities. It consists of a main stage, an alternative second stage, a market, a workshop and a camping area. Trees are decorated with bright-coloured clothing and lights that provide the area with a fairytale atmosphere, especially at night. A clear sign that the festival is approaching is the arrival of motley caravans and hippie families to town, along with goths and other minorities. The idea of taking advantage of the stunning natural landscape and ideal temperature to organise a musical event was followed by the creation of Global Tribe, an ecovillage located just a few kilometers from where the festival is held. This community has its own organic vegetable garden and huts which are for rent. It also receives visitors from all over the world.

==== Christmas in Almonte ====
Something unique regarding Christmas in Almonte is the way they celebrate it at the Matalascañas resort. Environmental association "Aires Africanos" allows three of the camels they have at their natural reserve to be mounted by the Three Magi and walk along the coast, until they finally arrive at the end of the urban area. Some of the camels may be taken to Almonte and El Rocío as well to participate in the parade. Another original aspect of this holiday is the amusement park installed at "El Chaparral", the fairground, in the town's eastern zone. The main attraction is the 420m^{2} ice rink, along with multiple rides, food stands and Christmas decoration.

==== El Rocío Chico ====
It is a celebration held every 19 August whose origins can be traced back to a vow some people from Almonte offered to their patron saint, the Virgin of El Rocío. During the war against France, French captain Pierre D'Oisseaux was executed in Almonte and Napoleon sent more than 1,000 soldiers from neighbouring Seville to take revenge, but they never arrived at Almonte. Many believers thought it was a divine intervention by the Virgin, for they had prayed that the soldiers did not make it to their town. Nowadays, a mass may be held at the temple of El Rocío, but beyond its religious origin, it is also a day for people to make the most of their leisure time.

=== Cultural landmarks ===
Almonte has several buildings with cultural purposes, but also playing a research or touristic role. Many of them are free of admission charges and have been created in the 90s and 2000s, using old wineries and oil mills purchased and restored by the town council. The biggest high school in town (IES Doñana), organises along with the town council a programme calles “Almonte Uncovered”, which consists of the touristic promotion of these cultural landmarks by students in three different languages (Spanish, English and French). Students record themselves explaining the monuments and buildings and these videos are streamed from different QR codes installed in each monument. Five different landmarks have been worked on so far: Ciudad de la Cultura, Wine Museum, the town hall, the Monument to the Mares and the church.

==== La Ciudad de la Cultura ====
With an area of 6,445m^{²} and a perimeter of 396 m, this space is located in the northern part of town. It was inaugurated in 2011 and part of it was a former winery, property of the Count of Cañete. It consists of 5 main buildings embedded within an outdoor paved area decorated with pictures, benches, lamp posts and plants. These 5 buildings are:

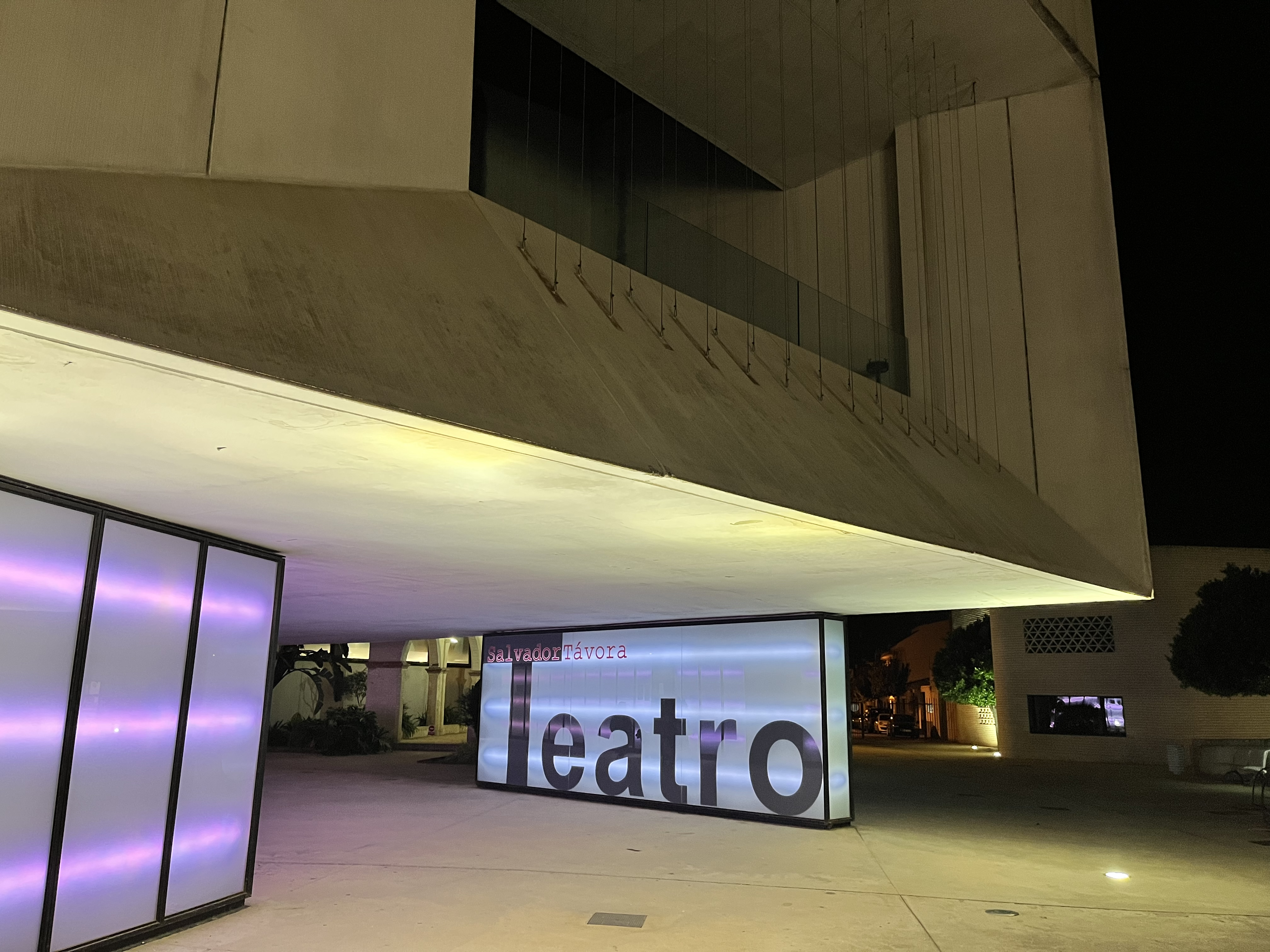
Front view of the theatre of Almonte

- Theatre "Salvador Távora", a modern square-shaped building designed by architect Juan Pedro Donaire Barbero and inaugurated by Spanish filmmaker Salvador Távora. It has a seating capacity of 512 people, ranking 2º in the province of Huelva, just after the capital's theatre. Almonte's theatre hosts nationwide-known plays and other national events, having been visited by Spanish ministers and well-known actors such as Pablo Carbonell, Lola Herrera, María Castro or Gorka Otxoa. Apart from the theatre itself, the building includes an indoor space for exhibitions and a second-floor terrace with a café.
- Cultural Centre "Baler Church": it is a 162.27m^{²} replica of the fortified church of Baler (Philippines), which became famous during the war between Spain and the United States. In 1898, during the Siege of Baler, Spanish soldiers quartered in the church were surrounded by the Filipinos. The Americans, already fighting against Filipinos, tried to rescue the Spanish soldiers. Spain finally surrendered on 2 June 1899. One of the Spanish survivors, José Jiménez Berro, was from Almonte. The replica was inaugurated by former Filipino president Gloria Macapagal and is used for administrative purposes. It also hosts an exhibition explaining the involvement of Almonte in that war. There is also a street in Almonte named "Heroes de Baler", in honour of the soldiers.
- Public Library "Ana María Matute". It is a 1,000 m^{²} two-floor library with more than 15,000 works. Apart from the different spaces for reading and studying, it has a multimedia room. It was inaugurated by Cervantes prize-winner Ana María Matute.
- Art School "Manolo Sanlúcar", inaugurated by the homonymous Spanish musician. It includes a music school and several guitar, singing, dancing and painting workshops.
- Templete: it is a small open temple located on the former winepress, where grapes where squeezed. It is the only original element left from the former winery.

==== Town Museum ====
It has replaced a former oil mill, the "Molino de Cepeda" and shows Almonte's local customs, including wine, wheat and oil production and the ancient agricultural and farming tradition linked to the Doñana National Park. The extensive ethnographic collection focuses on the symbiotic relationship between the urban and the natural environment and is divided into three main blocks: coast and marsh (farming, fishing and hunting), Almonte's agriculture (cereal, vineyards and olive) and industry (beekeeping, charcoal and tree oil, pine nut and wood extraction). It starts with a wide corridor showing the historical evolution of Almonte through pictures, texts and mockups, from prehistoric times to nowadays, going through Neolithic, Roman, medieval and modern stages. Once the corridor is walked along, there is an outdoor area showing replicas of traditional tools, animals and jobs. From there, people can access the third and last indoor section, a 500m^{2} building which hosts a great exhibition about El Rocío, including a replica of the "Abuelas Almonteñas" monument, whose original version is located in the east side of town. It also has several replicas of the different ephemeral cathedral built each seven years during the La Venida de la Virgen. Another interesting section shows the evolution of the ancient sculpture of the Virgin of El Rocío, from the original 12th-century gothic sculpture to the current version, which has undergone some baroque remodelling over time.

==== Sea Museum ====
The Museo del Mundo Marino (sea museum) was a 3,900m^{2} scientific and historical complex opened in 2002 and located inside the Parque dunar (west from Matalascañas), with a total investment of more €20 million, being one of the two museums in Spain to be certified with ISO 9001 and 14001 and AENOR. With six different rooms, it was the only museum in Europe to have a complete orca skeleton along with several other mockups, mammal skeletons and the most extensive shell collection in the country. It was also the only European museum to have the Ecosphere, a self-sustained spherical sealed ecosystem created by NASA, of which only one more replica was available at that time. It was designed for space flight and contains different species of shrimps, algae and bacteria. Different souvenir replicas were sold at the museum shop and more than 30,000 people used to visit the centre annually. After the elections of 2011, when mayor Francisco Bella left after 20 years in charge, a coalition was formed by right-wing PP and left-wing IU. The latter, at a regional level, sanctioned the two councillors who made it possible for PP to govern Almonte. In January 2012, the new local council decided to close the museum without receiving a regional grant that would solve what they claimed to be a financial crisis and all the content of the centre was taken to Seville. In 2023, after former mayor Francisco Bella had been reelected, the new local council announced the reopening of the museum, which would start by turning the former building into a centre for digital resources.

==== Museum of El Rocío ====
Located in the southewestern part of the village of El Rocío, on the west side of former road A483, this centre focuses on the symbiosis between the history of one of the most popular pilgrimages in the world and the largest natural reserve in Europe, Doñana. It is a 2,126m^{2} building surrounded by a fenced garden of around 12,500m^{2}. It was funded by the local council and the regional government. It has 9 main rooms and two inner courtyards, including a room for temporary exhibitions and several panels, mockups and relics. Its content refers to the Marismeño horse breed (a local protected species and ancestor of the American Mustang), local craftwork and architecture (which was also brought over to America, inspiring the far west architecture), the pilgrimage and other ancient customs.

==== Wine Museum ====
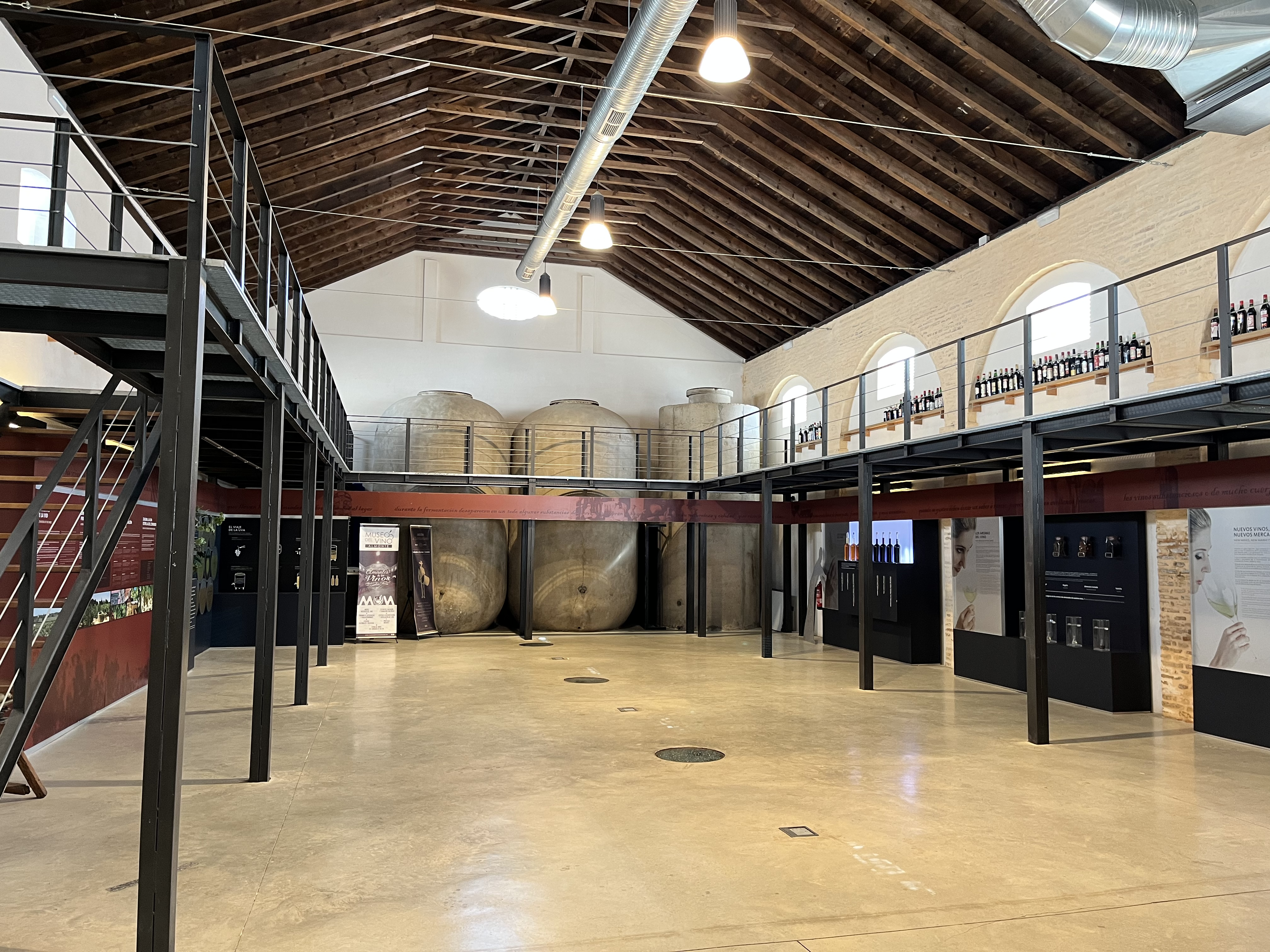
Storeroom of Almonte's wine museum

The "Museo del Vino de Almonte (MUVA) is a 1,000 m^{²}building inaugurated in 2014, after a ten-year remodelling of a 19th-century winery which belonged to the Escolar brothers, pioneers in wine technology. The museum offers guided tours, restaurants, shops and wine tastings. Local wines from Almonte, like Raigal (first sparkling wine in Andalusia, created in 1992) or Orange Wine are promoted and explained throughout its five main rooms, including their history and elaboration.

- Central patio: it is a 280 m^{2} outdoor area from which visitors can either enter the museum or the restaurant. Tables are usually laid on a corner for tasting products and there is a central decorative structure made of wine bottles. This patio included the former winepress, the fermentation and ageing tanks, the laboratory and an area for bottling and shipping. Big trunks and trailers unloaded the grapes here. Once the patio is finished, there is a covered area to access the museum.
- Winery: it is the main indoor room, with a separated area containing several American oak wine casks and a strong smell and another room with photographs explaining the harvest, elaboration and transportation of wine. It contains relics such as an iron weight, a still, a screw press, etc.
- Storeroom: this room includes a cellar, glass boxes to smell different raw materials and three of the eighteen original concrete tanks with a capacity of 10,000 litres.

==== Pinacotheca ====
This art gallery was opened in 2005 on the joint initiative of the city council, the Cuban surrealist and avant-garde painter Jorge Camacho, Juan Bautista Cáceres (owner of the cultural management company Ladrús, who would become its director) and the Galindo Faraco siblings. It is located in the in city centre, in El Cerro Street, northeast of the church. It consists of three rooms, one for a permanent exhibition and two temporary ones. The main room, on the ground floor, houses the permanent exhibition of Jorge Camacho, with much of his lifelong legacy from 1968 to 2009, influenced by the landscape of Almonte, specifically the surroundings of the Doñana National Park. This work has a mystical approach and a great use of colour to represent the natural landscapes of the municipality. The pinacotheca was reopened on 30 January 2025, as was the museum and other cultural facilities that remained closed during the legislative periods after 2011. The council, the Regional Government of Andalusia and the Provincial Deputation of Huelva, represented by Teresa Herrera and Gracia Baquero respectively, attended this event. For this reopening, the temporary exhibition of the work "Sueño Recurrente" by the abstract painter and sculptor from Huelva, Víctor Pulido, was shown. The room will allow educational use for the school of painters and the different educational centres.

==== Museo Forestal ====
The Wood Museum is a protected area of around 60 hectares at km8 of the A-483 (A-483 road), which connects Almonte with its other two urban areas, El Rocío and Matalascañas resort. Beyond the importance of the natural landscape itself, there is an organic farm school, a research centre for the Iberian lynx (which includes several multimedia rooms) and another one for the local pine tree, with a huge hollow trunk which people can visit. There is also a recreation ground integrated within the natural environment, with more than 162 different rides on trees including nets, bridges and walkways, hoops, bars and zip wires, some of them hanging at a height of eight metres above the ground.

==== Town's Cultural Centre ====
It has replaced the former 15th-century Hermitage of James the Great, which served as an entrance to town during pandemic outbreaks. Today it hosts the largest bibliographic collection about Doñana National Park, El Rocío and the province of Huelva, containing around 2,000 works, including out-of-print editions and rare books. It is located in the "Fuente de las Damas" park, in the west side of town. It is used for multiple cultural purposes, including auditions, conferences, art exhibitions, book launches and serves as the headquarters of the Municipal music band.

=== Literature ===
Almonte's contribution to literature started during the 19th century with writer Antonio Martín Villa, who became rector of the University of Seville. He wrote historical documents about the university and also reviewed poetic authors like Félix José Reinoso. Later in the same century, writer, professor and historian Lorenzo Cruz also made a contribution to Miguel de Cervantes's work and Almonte's history, focusing on religious events. A bust of him can be found in the Avenida de los Cabezudos street.

Regarding poetry, María Castilla started writing at the age of 13 about the natural environment she was raised in, namely Doñana. She won several awards of local poetry, including the second prize in 1995 for her poem Muda Nota. Rocío Blanco was a poet influenced by the Machado brothers. Within lyric poetry, María Endrina was a writer and teacher who became head at the school of Cabezudos and combined her teachings with her main hobby, writing children poems about her town, many of them set in the postwar period.

In 1995 the city council published the first book of a series of more than 100 works titled Cuadernos de Almonte. Previously focused on providing a historical perspective of town, many other later focused on art, gastronomy, literature, etc. Each of these blocks have a different colour on their covers, being as follows: green (history), pink (literature), yellow (gastronomy), blue (administration) and orange (painting). The blue books offer detailed information about budgets, awardings, records, certificates and other administrative elements.

From the second half of the 20th century on, several key people have contributed to Almonte's literary field. Domingo Muñoz Bort is a historian, archivist, writer and populariser who has worked as director of the Centro Cultural de la Villa, having published dozens of historical works and edited the above-mentioned series. Alfonsa De Almonte is a writer who has worked as the council's press officer and published several books for children.

As for novels, Juan Villa is a writer and literary critic who has published several short stories, novels and essays over the last decades, including Crónica de las Arenas, set in Almonte during the postwar period.Rocío Castrillo is Almonte's most renowned novelist, with national awards for novels such as Una Mansión en Praga (Descubrebooks; 2013), Ellas y el Sexo (Ed.: Pigmalión; 2014), En el Fin de la Tierra (CreateSpace; 2016). Her most controversial work is 151 Cuchilladas, an exhaustive analysis of the double murder of Almonte in 2013

Almonte hosts different literary contests as the one for short tales, organised by the youth centre. Youngsters aged 14 to 30 participate and two works are awarded each year in two different categories according to age. The Centro de Estudios Rocieros, which plays a key role in cultural researching, also contributes to literature with people like composers and songwriters Hermanos Gallardo, who have compiled more than 40 poems related to El Rocío, in their anthology Por Los Senderos del Alma.

==== Almonte within popular imagery ====
Owing to the great cultural influence and natural environment of the area, countless writers, filmmakers and other artists have been inspired to develop their work

Writers like Luis de Góngora, Juan Ramón Jiménez, Rafael Alberti, José Manuel Caballero Bonald, Fernando Villalón o Alfonso Grosso describe landscapes of Almonte. The prose poem Platero and I includes chaper 47, titled “El Rocío” and also a veterinary surgeon from Almonte called Darbón. Poem The Fable of Polyphemus and Galatea also includes references to different landscapes of the area. Various authors from Almonte like Villa siblings or Juan Francisco Ojeda published in 2015 Doñana, el paisaje relatado (Doñana, the narrated land), analysing the inspiration and emotions this privileged natural environment boosts in all the artistic fields.

Nowadays, new works inspired by cultural and natural references from Almonte keep on emerging, for instance, historical novel Alhaja, by Spanish author Ángel De Frutos. It tells the story of a woman who leaves Almonte in the 20s to emigrate to the city. Satirical noir fiction novel Un Hombre Lobo en El Rocío by es:Julio Muñoz Gijón, makes a sharp analysis of the contrast between tradition and modernity. Another Spanish author, Max Arel, published Cuentos de la Marisma de Doñana, a reflective work set in the coast.

=== Cinema ===
Almonte, thanks to its diverse and extensive territory, has been set for several films, shorts, documentaries, TV programmes and shows. Key landmarks include its long beaches, the village of El Rocío and the dunes inside the Doñana National Park.

==== Films shot in Almonte ====
Some worldwide-known films that have been shot in Almonte include: The Neverending Story or Lawrence of Arabia, shot in the dunes of Doñana. French thriller Anything for Her was shot in the town Almonte and the village of El Rocío, as well as Dutch The Flying Liftboy German film Sunburned (2009), directed by Swedish filmmaker Carolina Hellsgård, was shot in the Matalascañas beach.

As for Spanish cinema, some of the films set in Almonte are: Tenemos 18 años (1959), Canción de cuna (1961), Armas para el Caribe (1965), La Cólera del Viento (1972), El Viento y el León (1975), Mi Bello Legionario (1977), Made in Japón (1985) o La Cruz de Iberia (1990).

==== Film industry ====
The Film School of Almonte has been training filmmakers since the 90s, including the authors of cartoons "Aventuras en Doñana", which later inspired film The Missing Lynx (2009). This film won a Goya Award for Best Animated Film and was produced by Antonio Banderas, who visited Almonte the previous year to sign a commitment to save the Iberian lynx.

In 2001, the film company Producciones Doñana S.L was founded, having produced several works, including the short "Hambre" (2011), directed by Spanish filmmaker Mario De la Torre.

Almonte joined the Andalusian Film Commission and celebrates the Doñana International Scientific and Environmental Film Festival, promoting nature and sustainability. This festival sponsors new filmmakers and train scientific popularisers. Film sessions are usually held at the CIECEMA, in Almonte. A contest is also held, in which a professional jury awards the best film.

=== Music ===
Almonte's traditional music has been a main culture booster for centuries, being specially noticeable during El Rocío. It split into two brands: the instrumental one (with the flute and tabor) and the vocal (with the Sevillana Rociera and the fandango). In recent decades, several other styles have come up, mainly alternative rock, rumba and psychedelic trance (brought about by the Transition Festival).

Tabors have been used for centuries, modernising its material over time to meet current quality standards. Almonte's tabor is wider in diameter than the ones from northern Spain (around 50 cm wide and 80 cm high) and mostly made of wood and goat-leather-covered surfaces tightened by metallic rings. Tabor players develop a key role in traditional festivities, specially during the Pilgrimage to El Rocío, when they head the procession of the Hermandad Matriz interpreting the “Toque del Rocío” (literally, beat of El Rocío), a traditional melody from Almonte, quite different from the typical music within the genre. The “Toque del Alba” (dawn beat) is played as the sun rises, just before resuming the journey. Finally, the “Toque del Romerito” (little pilgrim's beat) puts an end to the trilogy of Almonte's traditional tabor beats. The most relevant event is the ”Mass of the Virgin of El Rocío”, during which hundreds of tabor players play at once, interpreting ancient melodies, quite far from typical Andalusian music. Spanish musician and composer Manuel Pareja Obregón co-founded the Tabor School of Almonte, one of the six main ones in the country and also wrote the Salve Universal, one of the most renowned Hail Marys in the world.

Flutes, in Spanish gaita almonteña or flauta rociera, as other instruments with three holes, come from the Greek syrinx, though they can be traced back to paleolithic ages. It is a 35-cm-long and 2-cm-wide pipe typically made of wood from local trees such as ash trees, orange trees, lemon trees or oleanders. Higher quality ones are more expensive and made of ebony, pomegranate tree or tulipwood. It can be played using the ring and little fingers, although the thumb may be necessary for certain notes.

It was in the Middle Ages when the combination of flute and tabor became usual in the area, as described in some excerpts from the medieval poems Cantigas de Santa María, read and interpreted during Alfonso X's reign. These manuscripts already mentioned hunting within the then-called Coto de Las Rocinas (a royal hunting ground in Las Rocinas woods). El Rocío has boosted as no other innovation and modernisation of these two instruments. Over time, several other elements have been added to the flute and tabor, including canes, castanets, hand drums, flamenco guitars and clapping. Nowadays, Almonte's flute and tabor are registered as Intangible cultural heritage by UNESCO and still play a key role in local festivities.

As for singing, Almonte has been adapting and innovating its own style of Sevillanas over the last centuries, ending up having the Sevillanas rocieras, which have become one of the seven official branches of the genre. Unlike typical sevillanas, rocieras are more melodious and have deeper and more moving lyrics, often related to Almonte's cultural or natural heritage (the woods of Doñana, the pilgrimage, the Virgin of El Rocío, etc.). Some of the most renowned titles are Historia de una Amapola (a story of a poppy) by Los Marismeños, Mírala Cara a Cara (look at her face to face) by Requiebros, Flores a Ella (flowers to her) by the es:Hermanos Toronjo, Tiempo, Détente (time, stop) by Los Romeros de La Puebla or Sueña la Margarita (the daisy dreams) by Amigos de Gines.

Most bands, singers and songwriters from Almonte emerged in the second half of the 20th century and, currently, there are around thirty well-known local artists of a variety of genres The most renowned bands are Requiebros, consisting of three brothers who begun their activity in the 80s and have released several international hits including Mi Huelva tiene una Ría, adopted as one of the province's anthems. Another well-known group is Senderos, formed by the Gallardo brothers and Manuel Ramos. They became popular in the 1990s and have released more than 30 albums and songs like Eso se Siente or Nostalgia. In the late 1990s, the group Varales emerged, with a successful album called Por Derecho. Regarding rock, the band The Pink Pylon has become popular in town, founded by Fran Báñez in the late 2000s and having released an EP in 2005 and an album in 2009, both with homonym titles and songs like Old Blues, Dark Night or Ice.

With regards to singers, Chico Gallardo is a singer-songwriter, guitar player and flamenco and rumba producer who has released several singles. Macarena De la Torre is a singer with success at a national level, with three albums released.

Almonte has an elementary music school, a flamenco school, a dance school and a public municipal band. The town has hosted performances by Julio Iglesias,Olé Olé, Rocío Jurado,es:José Manuel Soto, Pastora Soler, Chenoa, David DeMaría. Other local artists often perform at the weekends in pubs, hotels and other places, specially in the summer.

=== Sports ===
Almonte's stable warm weather has made it possible for the town to focus on outdoor sports. The council and different local sport organisations invest great quantities of time and money in promoting sports, having people of all ages participate actively. Many of them have been awarded with gold and silver medals both at a national and international levels, in sports like duathlon, judo, cycling, motocross, or rhythmic gymnastics. Other important activities focus on horse riding, with several contests regarding sport but also fashion and horse and camel rental to enjoy natural spaces. Almonte is the only city in eastern Huelva with an olympic swimming pool, located in the northern sport centre, one of the main ones in the province.

==== Public sport services ====
There are three main public centres, two of them in Almonte and a third one in El Rocío. The main one has an area of 43,561m^{2} and is located in the northern part of town. It has two football pitches, three tennis courts, an outdoor olympic swimming pool, an indoor swimming pool and another one for children, a running track and a covered stadium. The second one is “Los Llanos”, in the southern area of town, with four padel courts, a basketball court and a covered court. A little bit southwards there is an outdoors pétanque boulodrome. Outside town, to the south, there is a motocross circuit and an aeromodelling runway.

The third one, called “Campo Municipal del Deporte”, is located in the eastern outskirts of the village of El Rocío. It has a 25-metre swimming pool and another one for children, four basketball courts, two padel courts, an unpaved football pitch and a covered court. As for the private sector, there are 4 gyms in Almonte, three of them in the main urban core and a fourth one in the Matalascañas resort, area which also counts with a paragliding club, a saliling and fishing club and several organisations for horse and camel riding.

Several sport schools also offer training and degree certificates at several levels, for example the Regional Judo School, which provides middle and advanced titles. Other schools which also offer advanced certificates are football, indoor football, basketball, handball, athletics and lifeguarding. The “Almonte Balompié” is a top-class football team established in 1985. Its equipment consists of red t-shirt and socks and blue shorts. It plays both at the Top Andalusian League and Huelva's Regional League.

==== Cycling and motocross ====
Cycle sport also plays a main role in Almonte, both at professional and amateur levels. Local María Isabel Felipe won the European XCM in Laissac (France) in 2023. Regional cross-country race Huelva Series XCM is often organised in the area and there are important cycle clubs like Atrochamonte, which organises MTB marathons like “Doñana Natural”, an annual race started a decade ago. Matalascañas has also a 30-km cycle path which stretches from the easternmost point of the urban area up to Mazagón, a town 25 km to the west.

Almonte's motocross racetrack is located 5 km south from town and consists of a rectangular area of around 138,000m^{2}, being 1.5 km in length and having around 13 turns. Its fine-grain sand typical from areas next to the coast makes it unique in southern Spain and is a special challenge due to its deep grooves and constant reshaping. Different regional and national competitions take place in this circuit, including the Andalusian Championship The main sport centre in town has also hosted international FMX events, with renowned pilots like Edgar Torronteras, Dany Torres or Fernando de Rodrigo.

==== Volleyball ====
Volleyball is also prominent in town, namely beach volleyball. Almonte's girl junior team won the Spanish Cup in 2023 and the beginners topped the regional charts. During the 26th regional championship Circuito Pronvincial de Vóley Playa, which took place in Matalascañas beach, more than 200 teams from all over the region participated in different categories.

==== Horse riding ====
One of the most rooted and traditional sports is horse riding. As explained in the historical section, the Mustang horse breed was also brought over to America from the surrounding areas, its name being derived from the Spanish “mostrenco” (meaning “wild”), a term which also applies to a local Marismeña (cow breed from Almonte). The most important horse centre in the entire province is Formades. With an area of 16,000m^{2}, it is located in the eastern zone of the village of El Rocío, next to former road A483. It consists of four main buildings: a 3,000m^{2} indoor arena, an outdoor barn, a hall and a school. It offers up to 10 different courses, including horse farming, working riding, saddlery, shoeing and green energies. An average of 10,000 hours are offered annually for more than a hundred students.

An average of 70% of students successfully got a job after leaving the school. There are also outdoors horse arenas at AICAB, also in El Rocío, in the northwestern part of town. More than 20,000m^{2} are available for horse championships, exhibitions and other activities. Spain's Working Riding Championship is usually held in Huerta de la Cañada, an extensive outdoors equestrian facility able to host thousands of equids and located outside town, in the northern part. This area serves also to gather horses during the ancient and popular event Saca de las Yeguas, which is further explained in the festivities’ section. El Ranchito is another facility located in El Rocío which also hosts equestrian exhibitions.

Local horsemen like Alfonso Martín Díaz or Carlos Fernández have both won several national and regional championships in different categories. There is also a horse riding school 1.5 km far from town towards northwest called Cuatro Aguas Driving Team and horse club Amigos del Caballo, in Matalascañas, also hosts horse riding championships, exhibitions and training lessons. Local touristic company El Pasodoble organises horse routes at different levels and is located next to the horse club mentioned before.Combined driving contests such as Copa Andaluza de Obstáculos (Andalusian Obstacle Cup) or Concurso Internacional de Enganches de Tradición (International Traditional Combined Driving Championship) and belt races must also be included as traditional activities in which locals often top sport rankings.

==== Hunting ====
Hunting, both at a sport level and for animal overpopulation purposes has always played a key role in Almonte, being the main reason behind the establishment of the Doñana National Park, which was for centuries a royal forest. There are more than 700 hunting licenses and three main organisations. Hunters and amateur locals have long been demanding a shooting range in town, for the one located at the coast is restricted to military activities. Almonte is soon expected to build the first olympic shooting range in the province, which would host contests both at a national and international levels.

==== Inline skating ====
Almonte currently keeps on investing and innovating on sports. The first Inline Alpine Slalom club in Andalusia was founded in 2022, with the first track ever built in the southeastern part of town, within Clara Campoamor park. The town participated in the Spanish Cup in Barcelona and got the 1st position in the masculine U11 category.

=== Gastronomy ===
Almonte's Mediterranean cuisine is pretty varied, but mostly focus on either game meat or fish, for it is a territory where the Atlantic Ocean and the Doñana National Park merge. Wild rabbits, deer, boars and partridges are the most common recipes regarding meat, due to hunting in the Doñana surroundings, a very traditional activity. As for fish, the worldwide-known "gamba blanca" (white prawn) is the signature dish, along with Atlantic mackerels and sardines. Berries have also become trendy over the last decades, since it is one of the top berry exporters in Europe Concerning vegetables, wild asparagus and beans are quite frequent. There are also many desserts which have a Muslim origin and whose main ingredient is honey, a traditional ingredient of the zone. Some of the most typical dishes include:

- Stuffed atrichokes

It is a traditional recipe consisting of artichokes stuffed with jamón, garlic, onion, boiled eggs and parsley. Once stuffed, they are wrapped up in breadcrumb and after being stir-fried, they are cooked. There is a separate typical dish in which the hearts are stir-fried with oil, garlic and small ham cubes.

- Caracoles and cabrillas

These are small and big snails, respectively. They are typically eaten in Spring and served in taverns and outdoor establishments, being seldom offered at restaurants. Unlike in certain places of Cádiz, snails are not eaten before drinking its soup in a glass, but rather served straight on a plate. Cabrillas are typically cooked in a sauce, like tomato or others.

- Lamb stew

Lamb recipe usually cooked with vegetables, bread and wine. Offals are often included in the dish.

- Cocido almonteño

This is an original version of the typical Spanish cocido consisting of chickpeas, green beans and pumpkin, along with chicken and beef. It ends up with an orange colour.

- Coquinas a la marinera

Alike typical wedge clams, they are stir-fried with oil, garlic and parsil, but adding onion, tomato, saffron and paprika.

- Stone bass in almond sauce

A sliced salted bass cooked in its soup and complemented with a sauce of fried almond, onion, garlic, bay and wine. Rice or potatoes may be added too.

- Habas Enzapatás

It is a signature dish from Almonte consisting of big broad beans cooked with garlic, pennyroyal or coriander and salt. It can also be found with some different ingredients in neighbouring towns.

- Hallullas

These are crunchy half moon-shaped toasted bread, stuffed with a wide variety of ingredients, the most common being pringá, cod, salmon, chorizo, frigate tuna with tomato, blue cheese and pork.

- Pan bazo

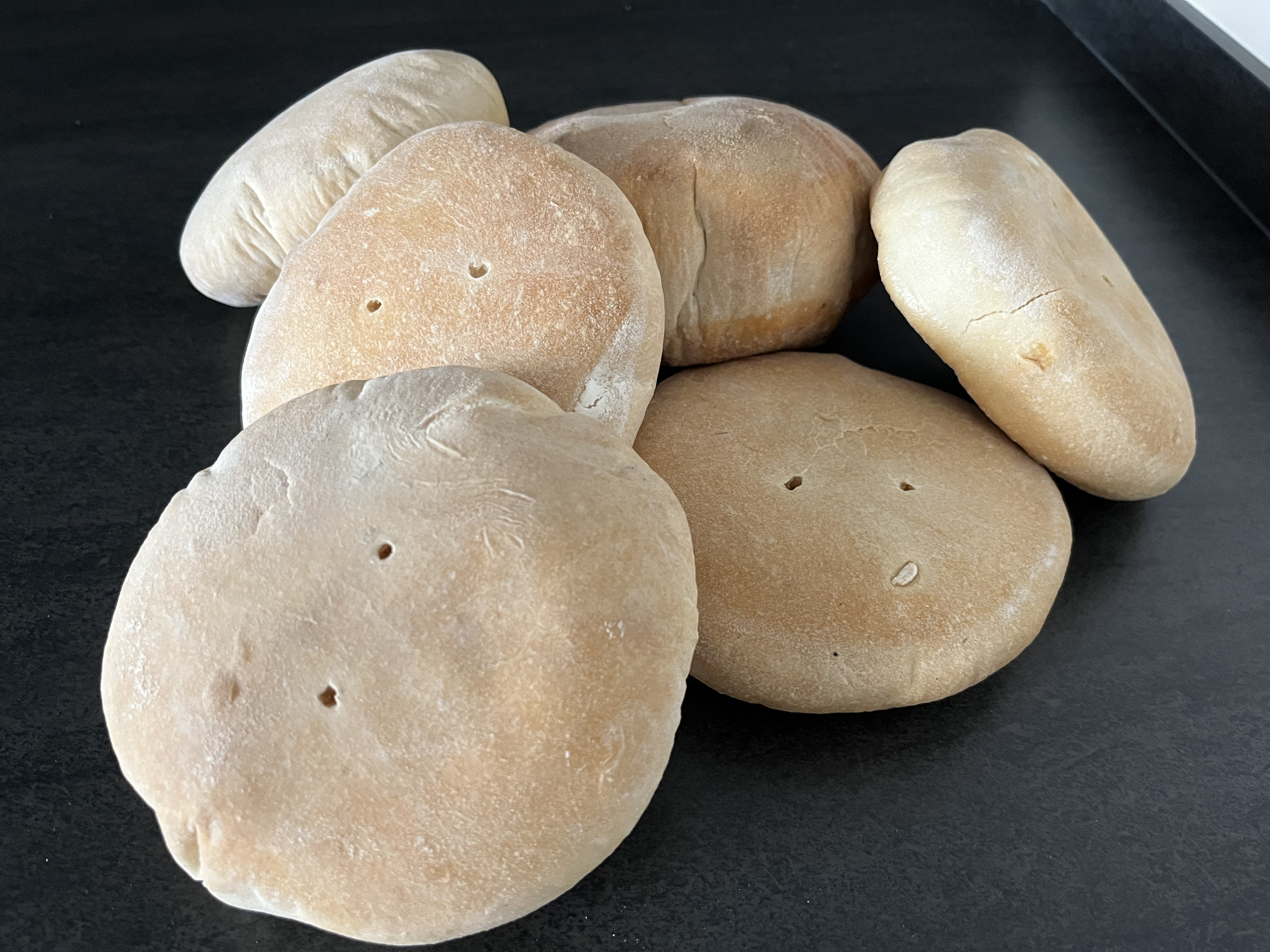
Typical "bazo" bread from Almonte

It is the signature bread of Almonte, with a very dense texture and typically sold by local bakery Martín Naranjo, so they are locally known as "pan de Naranjo" (Naranjo's bread). It also produces the "Roscos Almonteños" breadsticks.

- Stewed partridge

It is the signature game dish in Almonte. Partridges are cleaned and salted. Then they are stir-fried with garlic and paprika. they are finally cooked as a hotpot and served with either rice or chips.

- Pezuñas

It is a local dessert consisting of a hoof-shaped sponge cake, soaked in syrup and filled with pastry cream. Egg yolk cream is then spread on top.

- Poleá con miel

It is a typical Spanish poleá, but in Almonte they often spread some honey and add clove to the original recipe.

- Revuelto de Matalascañas

This is a scrumbled eggs recipee with fresh cod, stir-fried with garlic, onion, bay and parsil.

- Repápalos

These are traditional pieces of wheat, leavening, water and salt fried in olive oil. They can be soaked in hot chocolate, honey or sugar, but can also be eaten alone.

- Goose Marismeña Soup

It is a recipee made of fried goose cooked with several spices which is served over slices of bread soaked in the stew soup. Egg, spearmint and garlic may also be added.

- Marismeña cow with rice

This is another signature game dish from Almonte. Local marismeña cow is used. The meat is cooked with carrots, wine and spices. Then rice is added.

- Doñana Cake

It is one of the most traditional dishes in Almonte. It consists of whipped cream and jelly, dry figs, pine nuts, raisins, almonds, dates, walnuts and honey.

- Almonte's Strawberry Cake

Like the previous dessert, it also has whipped cream and jelly, but mixed with a sponge cake and soaked in syrup and orange or lemon juice. Then it is covered with a layer of organic strawberry jam.

- Raigal Wine

It is the first sparkling wine in Southern Spain, created in 1992). Currently, its dry white variety is the most popular, using organic zalema grape. It comes in at 10.5% ABV. It has a greenish colour and a soft flavour.

=== Sister cities ===
Almonte has seven twin towns established in the last decades, the more recent ones being Clare and Céret. They share different cultural activities and economic deals with each other. Sanlúcar de Barrameda, for example, shares frontier with Almonte, being separated by the Guadalquivir river and Sanlúcar's filial confraternity is one of the first to participate in Almonte's pilgrimage and holiday, El Rocío. Baler was the city where some Spanish soldiers, including one from Almonte, got surrounded by the Filipinos during the Spanish American War. Clare was the first Australian town to apply for membership to El Rocío, becoming a filial confraternity. Farsia's adhesion to the list focuses on some exchange programmes by which Sahrawis spent their summer holidays in Almonte, being hosted by local families, as a sign of solidarity with this African community.

Céret (France) / Clare (Australia) / Farsia (Western Sahara) / Baler (Philippines) / La Estrada (Spain) / Sanlúcar (Spain) / Estepona (Spain)

== Economy ==
Almonte has an extensive private industry due to two main factors: its vast amount of natural resources and tourism. It has had an average revenue of €45,000,000 in the last decade and reached its top in 2019 with roughly €63 million, ranking 1st within the province, just after Huelva, the capital city. The locals have traditionally made a living out of olives, vineyards, acorns, honey, pine nuts, salt, wood, charcoal, farming, agriculture and fishing. In the 50s, Almonte had 58 wineries, 10 oil mills, 4 wheat mills, two soda factories, 10 butcher's, 8 fishmonger's, 12 fruit shops and 20 grocery shops. In 2022, there were around 1,898 businesses registered in the municipality (63 of them with more than 20 employees, 473 of them wholesalers, 261 focusing on crop agriculture, livestock farming and fishing, 254 to hospitality industry, 200 to construction and 120 to other services).

=== Primary sector ===
==== Crops ====
Wheat, vines and olive trees have been the main crops in the area for centuries, with three distinct agricultural domains: the fields, the marshes and the coastal forest landscape. The field is a small part of the municipal territory and consists of small irregular plots mainly dedicated to vineyards, olive groves and cereals. They were also used for barley, oats or fodder to feed livestock. In 1976 there were 382 hectares of wheat and 800 hectares of barley. In the mid-20th century, Almonte produced 5 million litres of wine, 2,000 tonnes of olives, 10,000m^{3} of pine wood, 2,000m^{3} of eucalyptus and 7,000 metric quintals of coal. There were about 14 million pine trees and 16 million eucalyptus trees.

Almonte has 2,843 hectares of arable crops (chiefly strawberries and sunflowers) and 4,334 of wood crops, mainly blueberries and olives. Around 20 companies have its headquarters in Almonte, some of them topping European charts. Almonte is the first blueberry exporter in Europe. The main exporters include Atlantic Blue, founded in 1993. Next year both Bionest and Surexport were established; the first one with 748 employees and an average yearly income of 30 million euros and the latter with almost 3,000 employees and an average annual income of €200 million and 1,600 hectares available for crops. Guaperal was founded in 1998 and Fresmiel in 2004. Three of these companies rank among the first 10 Spanish fruit exporters. Almonte is the municipality with the most extensive organic crop surface in the province. and several of its companies participate in the international fair Fruit Attraction, celebrated at IFEMA, in Madrid.

==== Livestock ====
As detailed in the historical section, livestock farming has played a fundamental role in Almonte for time immemorial. In 2009, a total of 410 livestock farms were registered in the municipality, of which 276 belong to the equine sector (being the 9th municipality in Andalusia, after the 8 provincial capitals) and 72 to the bovine sector. The livestock sector has two main branches in the Almonte: horses and cows. The native equine and bovine breeds coexisted with the ancient Tartessian civilization, were partly domesticated by Muslims during the Middle Ages, exported to America in the 16th century (giving rise to the popular Mustang breed) and protected within the Doñana National Park since 1969. The National Association of Marismeño Livestock Breeders, located in the northern area of town, was founded in 1982 to protect the interests of local ranchers and the protected native breeds, the Marismeño horses and Marismeña cows.

Almontean horses are classified by the Official Catalogue of Livestock Breeds of Spain (Annex I of Royal Decree 45/2019, of February 8) as threatened native breed. It is a eumetric species, with a subconvex and subloingilinear profile, robust and balanced in character, very rustic and with a quick gait. The most common are the roan, chestnut and black coats and have an average height of 148 cm.

Almonte has successfully maintained traditional farming, which coexists with state-of-the-art breeding and crop technologies. Livestock is based on two main branches: horses and sheep. Both wild and domestic horses can be found in the area, the first in the southern part of the municipality, mainly within Doñana National Park and the latter around towns, being used for animal traction, contests, leisure, etc. Wild and semi-feral horses are taken every year to town from the park during the popular Saca de las Yeguas, after which they are sold. As for sheep, traditional shepherds can still be found, specially in the countryside around town. The Marismeña cow is also registered by the same national institution as threatened species. An ancestral relative of the legendary aurochs, it is a very rustic, nervous and elusive orthoid bovine species, with a small head and pearly, fine, curved horns and short, thick hair with a reddish coat with possible white spots on the lower part of the trunk, periocular discolouration and a border around the snout. Females do not usually organise themselves in groups of more than twenty, while males wander alone, joining said groups during the mating season. It is estimated that there are more than 2,000 specimens in Almonte.

==== Fishing ====
Even though nearly half of the coast of Huelva belongs to Almonte, it hasn't got a great fishing industry. It's due to three main factors: the distance between the main town and the coast (around 26 km) with a rather rcent road built in the 50s) and the fact that 28 km of Almonte's coastal territory have been restricted to authorised fishing only, by Order of 6 October 1998, as part of Doñana National Park. However, it is worth mentioning the main uses of fishing in two modalities: sportive and traditional (with a relevant role of the coquineros, coquina fishers). As for traditional fishing, most usual techniques in Almonte include gillnetting, trawling, longline, fish trap, jábega, seine, alcatruz (clay jugs tied together where octopuses hide), the bag net (tunnel-shaped net with several rings that is normally used in the marsh), cast net and the trail (closed net attached to an iron trail that coquineros drag along the sandy bottom) have been practiced in Almonte.

The main species caught off the coast of Almonte include the Gamba blanca (parapenaeus longirostris), also known as the deepwater rose shrimp, the coquina clam (very characteristic of the area, as it rarely found anywhere else), the prawns (so heavily sold in neighbouring town of Sanlúcar de Barrameda that it's been popularly associated with it), the cuttlefish, the pilchard, the silver seabream, the sea bass, the meagre, the red porgy, the sole, the tope, the conger, the bastardfish, the pandora, the spotted seabass and the Atlantic pomfret. In 2006 there were 18 fishing licences in Almonte. With regard to sport fishing, it is estimated that there are around 200 enthusiasts and more than a dozen competitions organised by the fishing club. Finally, fishing in the marshes is what really makes Almonte different from surrounding towns. The European eel, the Italian bleak, the swamp crayfish and the Spanish pond turtle are the main catches in this ecosystem and fishing generally takes place in spring and summer, since in winter the water level rises and the fish disperse. Countries such as Italy imported eel from the Acebrón swamp in the 1950s. Most fishers are self-employed restaurant owners and fishmongers who sell at a retail level. Virtually all the restaurants in Almonte offer high-quality fresh fish.

=== Secondary sector ===
There were 1,677 manufacturing businesses in Almonte, 561 devoted to car repairing; 284 to restaurants, 232 to construction, 103 to science and 80 to manufacturing. An extensive crop industry, including organic berries, was established during the 90s, positioning the town at the top of berry production rankings at a European level.

There are several industrial states, the main ones being "El Tomillar", in the south of town, with an area of 110,000m^{²} and 150 multipurpose units which focus on steel, furniture, meat production, ice, rubber, etc. and "Matalagrana", located between Almonte and El Rocío, with 200,000m^{²} and chiefly focused on agriculture (berries and honey), with international-scope companies such as Bionest, Atlantic Blue or Fresmiel. This estate also hosts the biggest of the 8 fire stations in the province, with four main vehicles and covering 10 neighbouting towns (around 100,000 people).

=== Tertiary sector ===
==== Leisure areas ====
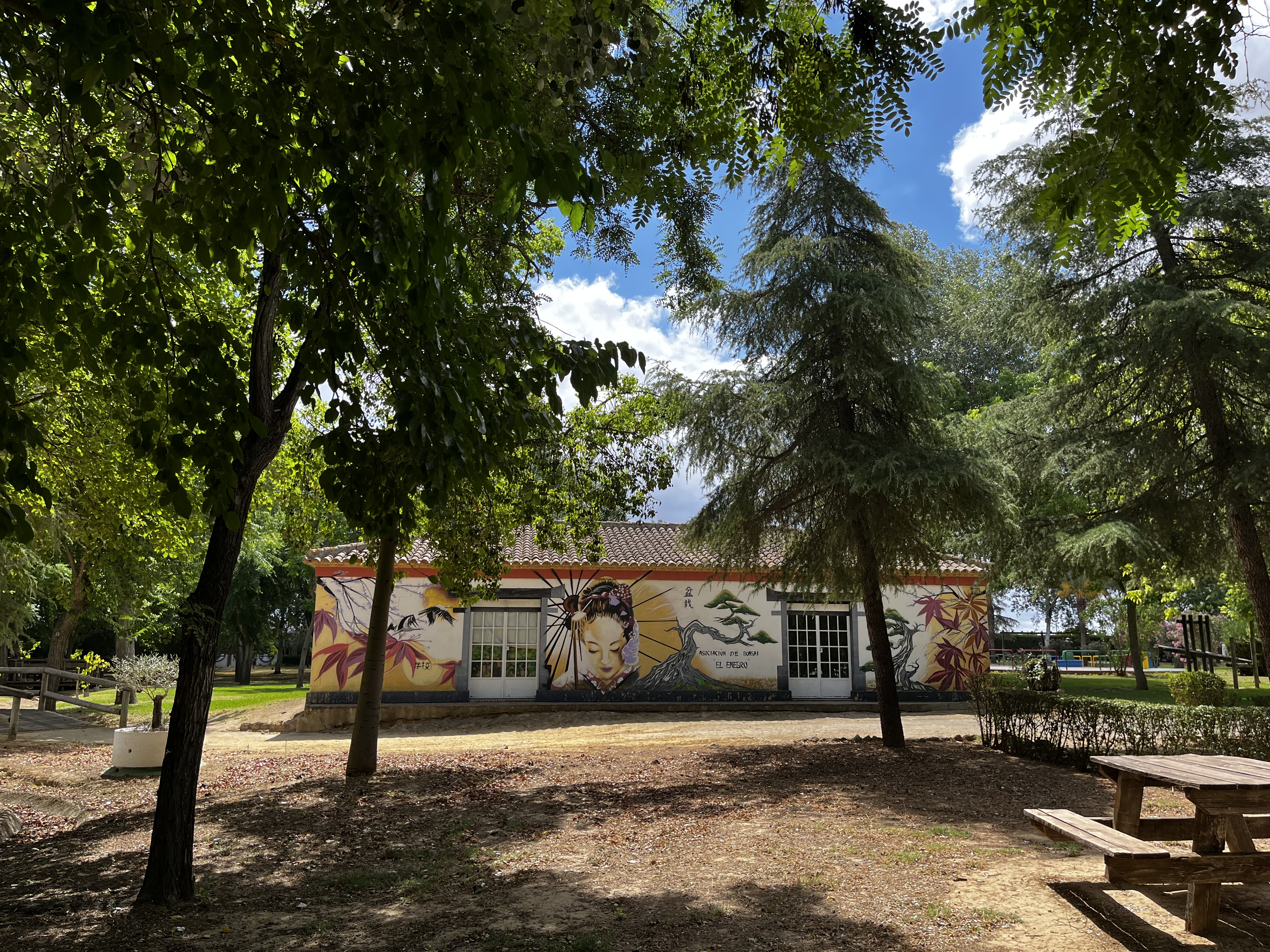
Bonsai workshop in Almonte's park

Almonte has 9 public parks, the largest being "Alcalde Mojarro", with an area of 44,831m^{²}. It has several tree species, a central lake which hosts migratory birds, fish and amphibians, several recreative areas with swings and other rides and calisthenics devices, a bonsai workshop, a skating rink, two captive donkeys, an open-air cinema, a gardening workshop and a multipurpose building for conferences. The coastal town of Matalascañas has another open-air summer cinema, an amusement park and an outdoor enclosure for festivals called Surfasaurus.

==== Tourism ====
The touristic sector plays a key role in Almonte, being mainly focused on history, gastronomy, wine and monumental routes in the main town, the pilgrimage in the village of El Rocío and summer holidays in Matalascañas, as explained in the local festivities section. Almonte is one of the ten towns declared as a tourist attraction by the regional government.

- Hotels

Almonte has around 25 accommodation establishments, from which 13 are hotels and 12 are hostels, the total number of beds being around 9,000 (52% hotels, 34% apartments and camps and 13% vacation homes). On City, located in Matalascañas, is the biggest resort in western Andalucía. The town of Almonte has three main public parking areas, from which two are free. "Martín Villa" parking, located in the homonymous street, has three floors with an area of 768m² each and space for around 90 vehicles. The Carrefour supermarket, located in that same street, has a parking lot for 35 vehicles and the Dia supermarket, at the small roundabout in Carretera del Rocío street, offers around 40 spaces. The two free parking lots are both located in Picasso street, nearby the town centre, with a conjoined area of 1,500m^{2} and capacity for 120 vehicles. When massive events such as "La Saca de las Yeguas", El Rocío or "La Venida de la Virgen" take place, alternative parking areas are made available, such as the one in street Avenida de los Cabezudos, with 2,600m^{²}.There's also an ecovillage called Global Tribe.

- National and international programmes

Almonte has been participating in Fitur (the International Tourism Trade Fair) for more than 40 years, promoting its extensive touristic offer. Apart from the Doñana National Park and its surroundings, beach tourism and El Rocío, there's also the flamenco fashion industry, with designers such as Rocío Cabrera, José Joaquín Gil, Rima Prociviecene or Juan Francisco Gil Ortiz and contests like SIMOF (International Flamenco Fashion Week). Almonte ranked 10th in the list of the 22 most beautiful Spanish towns by magazine Viajar, being first in its province. It has also featured in TV documentaries and programmes such as "Callejeando", highlighting some of its most emblematic streets. A great part of this comes from the cultural investment over the last decades.

- Local projects

Two touristic enterprises were launched in 2022. Destino Rocío was jointly organised by Almonte's and Seville's city councils and the Regional Government of Andalusia. It has established eight official routes all over southern Spain that lead to El Rocío, promoting gastronomy, improving cattle routes and meeting other cultural and economic purposes. The second project is the Camino del Rocío a Santiago de Compostela (a new official route within the Camino de Santiago), launched by Almonte along with another eleven towns, with the collaboration of the council of Huelva and the Hermandad Matriz. Tiles depicting St James's shell combined with the Virgin of El Rocío (Almonte's patron saint) have been placed in different streets of town and landmarks all along the way up to the Via de la Plata, which connects to Santiago de Compostela.

American magazine Condé Nast published an article within its section Traveler about Almonte, highlighting 7 main places of interest, including the historical centre of town, the village of El Rocío and Matalascañas. National Geographic included three of Almonte's beaches (Cuesta Maneli, Matalascañas and El Asperillo) within its ranking of the best 20 beaches in Andalusia. Despite being one of Almonte's main economic sources, this massive tourism has also brought about some environmental damages, such as litter on the ditches bordering road A-483, which connects the town to the coast. Light and noise pollution are also a main concern, specially in urban areas located in the Doñana National Park surroundings. That's why the town council has taken several measures, including fines of more than €30,000.

==== Restaurants ====
Almonte has more than 100 establishments, excluding coffee shops, from which more than 30 are located within the town. Around 23 are in the village of El Rocío and around 37 in Matalascañas. They typically focus on its traditional cuisine.

== Services ==
=== Education ===
According to the records of the town council, the first public teachers began to work in the town at the beginning of the 17th century, mentioning Francisco Delgado as a teacher appointed in 1601 and a grammar school in 1609. Throughout the 18th century, the town council ordered the closure of several schools due to some teachers lacking an official degree. In 1770 Almontean priest Pedro Barrera Abreu, being canon of the Cathedral of Valencia, donated 7,200 pounds to the town council as a pious work for the education of the most disadvantaged population, creating a trust for the administration of these assets and purchasing various properties to build schools. It was not until 1851 that a woman was appointed as a school teacher, Dolores Sayangos, with a salary of 2,000 reals a year. By the end of the 19th century, there were 3 schools in town, which would rise to 23 by the early 1960s. Almonte has been trying to solve a burden for centuries with regard to promoting higher education training, since the abundance of job offers with basic and secondary training in all sectors makes it difficult for part of the population to be motivated to access university studies, although more and more students are choosing to access a degree.

Almonte currently has 28 schools, from which 13 are elementary schools, 7 primary schools and 3 high schools. "I.E.S. Doñana" is the largest high school in the region, located in the northern part of town. More than 1,300 students and around 110 teachers work there. Neighbouring high school "I.E.S. La Ribera" is also in this area. Almonte has one of the four Official Schools of Languages in the province as well as equestrian school. It has also 3 public libraries.

=== Transportation ===
Due to its vast agricultural and organic crop industry and its massive seasonal tourism, Almonte's roads have a constant flow of vehicles, having been widened and reshaped several times over the last decades. Most widely used public transport is the intercity bus, which connects the three main towns within the municipality, namely Almonte, El Rocío and Matalascañas and is free for residents. There's a significant daily bus flow to take labourers from the town to the organic crops. During massive events such as El Rocío or the Venida de la Virgen, extensive areas are turned into temporary parking areas and extra bus lines are included, some of them hourly. In the summer, buses also run more often to the beach and roads may become clogged with traffic from neighbouring cities of Huelva and Seville towards the coast, specially at weekends.

==== Road transportation ====
The main road to get to Almonte is motorway A-483, a turn-off at km49 of motorway A-49, between Seville and Huelva. It bypasses Almonte and passes by El Rocío, ending at the Matalascañas resort, in the Atlantic coast. Secondary road A-484 departs from Bonares and get to Almonte, passing by neighbouring Rociana. Secondary road A-474 connects Almonte to Seville, passing by neighbouring towns Pilas or Castilleja de la Cuesta. Around 20 taxi companies work in Almonte.

Motor vehicles (2021)
Vehicle	Quantity
Cars	11,432
Taxis	13
Goods transportation	113
Traveller transportation	81
Total	11,639

Almonte has a regular bus line to reach its urban areas of El Rocío and Matalascañas. The bus station, in the east part of town, is often busy due to local transport either related to temporary labourers going to the berry fields or to summer transport to the beach. It also has regional lines to Huelva and Seville and international lines to Portugal and Romania. The street with busiest traffic is Carretera del Rocío, the main business avenue, where two roundabouts have been installed over the last two decades to smooth gridlocks at rush hour. Busiest road is A-483, which connects Almonte to the Atlantic coast. In the summer, especially at weekend evenings, long-lasting traffic jams are produced in this road.

==== Train ====
Nearest train station is located 10 km to the north, at neighbouring town La Palma. There is another one in Huelva and high-speed train in Seville.

==== Plane ====
Nearest airports are: Seville Airport (58 km away), Faro Airport (Portugal), 132 km away) and Jerez Airport (144 km away). Almonte also has two heliports, the one next to the abandoned village Los Cabezudos and the other one in El Rocío and two airfields, both west from town.

==== Sea ====
Almonte has four sailing clubs which also combine fishing and wind sports at Matalascañas resort and a ferry route across the Guadalquivir river that gets to neighbouring fishing town Sanlúcar.

=== Beaches ===
Matalascañas offers several public services of education, transport, cleaning, waste collection, sports and leisure that are especially reinforced during the summer months, when the population multiplies by 60, surpassing that of the capital of the province. Almonte's council makes large public investments and private concerts to maintain the coastal territory, which suffers great wear and tear in the low season due to the harsh winter climate and also maintains a delicate balance with the Doñana National Park. The promenade is also adapted with different access points for disabled people (ramps, walkways on the sand, etc.). As an example, the new contract for waste collection approved in 2024 had an annual investment of 6 million euros and the different reforms and maintenance of the promenade and monuments usually involve million-dollar amounts as well.

==== Lifeguarding ====
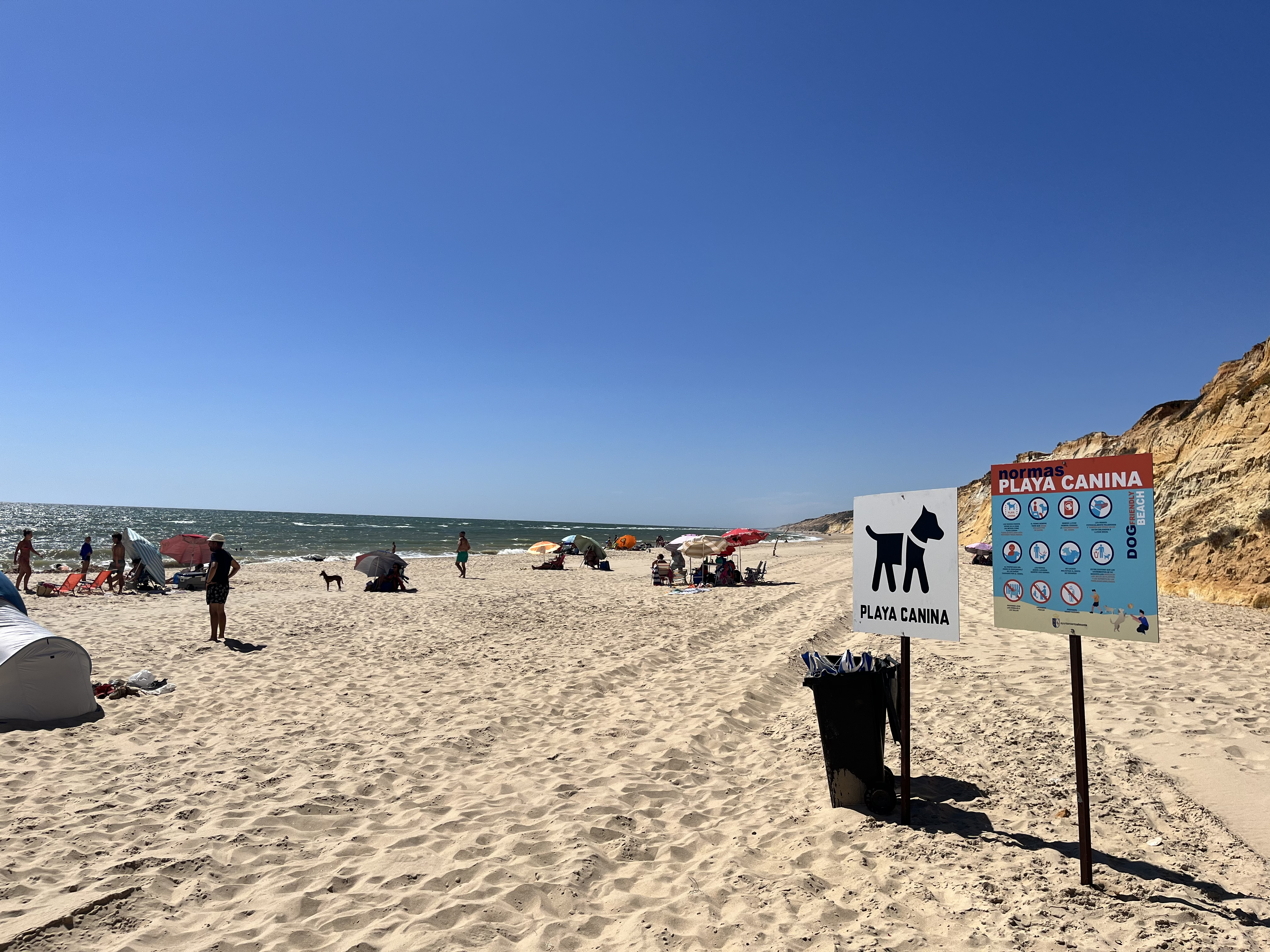
Almonte dog beach

Matalascañas has 7 lifeguard posts spread out along its 4 km of beach, with the main headquarters on the beach in the district N, very close to the Sun roundabout. Almonte organises lifeguard training courses and most of the labour contracted for this service are young locals. Serious incidents are rare in high season, most of them related to natural causes in elderly people or greater weever injuries.

==== Dog beach ====
Almonte has 1 km of beach, from the end of the section reserved for the nautical club next to the Bananas beach bar towards the west. The rest of the coast is restricted to pets, except in the low season (November to April), when they can access the beach as long as they are on a leash. Chiringuito Bananas allows a limited number of dogs, as the influx of customers is high in summer.

== Science and technology ==
Almonte's coastal location and biodiversity thanks to Doñana provides its territory with great opportunities to develop all kinds of scientific research. It was in the 40s when forest engineering arose, with many forest settlements focused on oil and wood extraction. In the 60s, Doñana was established, and more than half of the park is in Almonte, making up 35% of the municipality. In this decade, the focus of study turned into biology and botany. In this same decade, making the most of the optimal average weather conditions, several military facilities were installed at the beach, widening the scientific focus on defense and technology. Finally, an interest in astrophysics has been rising since the 2000s, reaching its peak with the building of an astronomical observatory in town.

=== Astrophysics ===
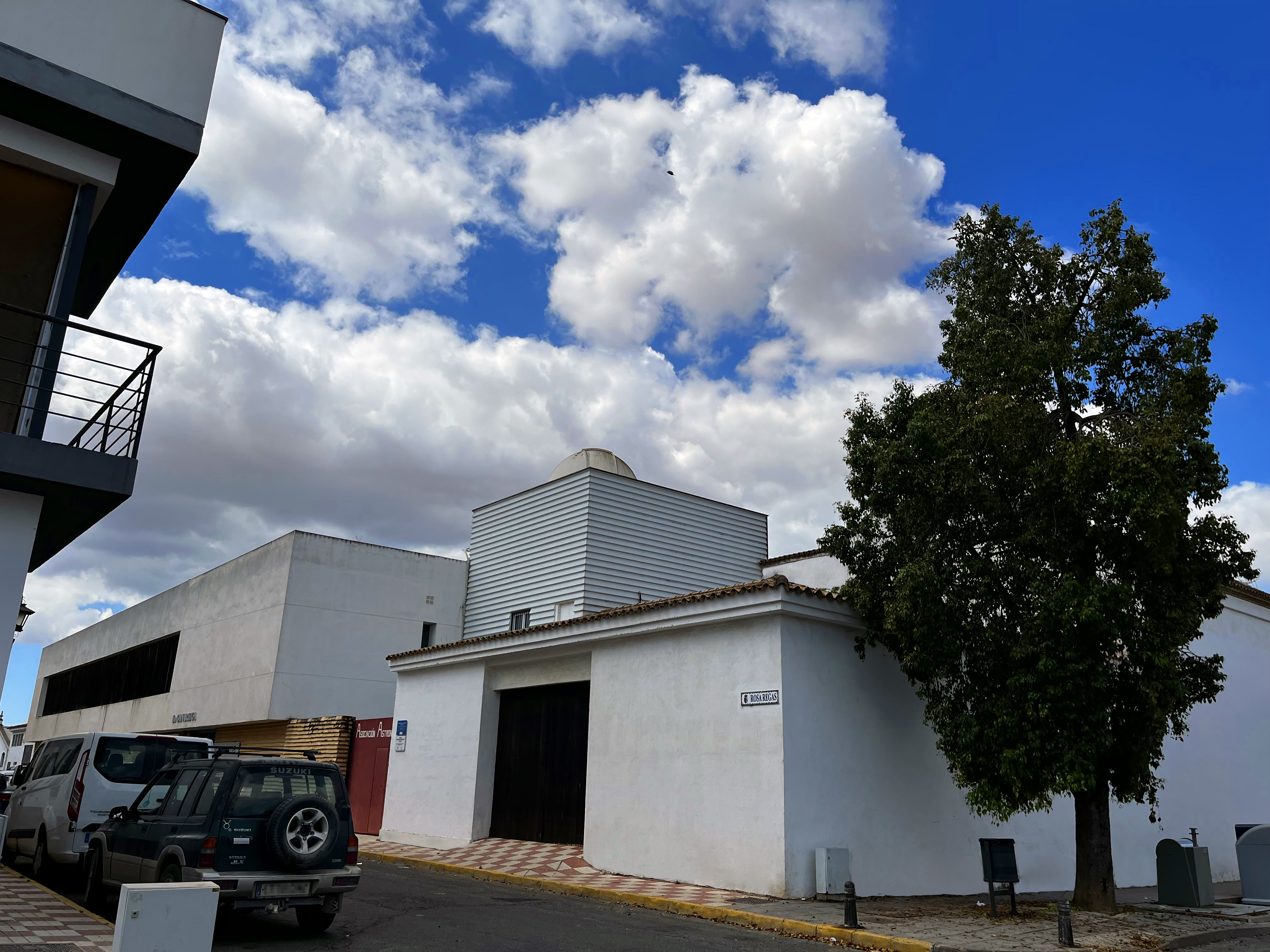
Almonte's Astronomy Club, with the observatory on top

Almonte has an astronomical observatory inaugurated in 2010 by CSIC's astrophysicist and cosmologist Juan P. Mercader. It's located in the CIECEMA (International Centre for Environmental Studies), in the north part of town. It has a 500mm-diameter mirror and a high-resolution CCD camera, being unique in the region. It's managed by Almonte's Astronomical Association, whose headquarters are in this same building.

Many scientists and amateur people meet nearby the Matalascañas's lighthouse to observe lunar eclipses, for the area has little light pollution and the sky is clear at night. The town of Almonte also organises an event called "Ciencia al Fresquito", held at night in the summer at park "Clara Campoamor", which is rather elevated. Anyone can use several telescopes to observe the night sky at this event.

==== Instituto Nacional de Técnica Aeroespacial ====
In 1966, as requested by NASA, a rocket launch station was installed at the coast, in the border area between Almonte and Moguer. More than 500 sounding rockets have been launched so far, most of them focusing on weather research. It is currently run by the Spanish National Institute for Aerospace Technology. NASA has also provided high-tech radar technology and there are both European and American scientists working in there. In April 2022, the first recoverable launch vehicle in Europe, the Spanish-manufactured Miura 1, will be launched from this site.

=== Biology ===
==== Captive breeding centre "El Acebuche" ====
This space, created in 1992, has an area of 120,000m^{²} and is located at km 37 of road A-483. It has 18 different sections to breed the Iberian lynx So far, there have been around 128 births and 33 releases. Scientists, veterinarians, watchers and security guards work at the facility, along with the Supervisory Committee for the Lynx, which has members from 15 international organisations. Next to this scientific building, there is a centre for visitors where two of the lynxes can be directly observed. It has a parking lot and restaurant.

==== Estación Biológica de Doñana ====
The "Doñana Biological Station" is a national research complex founded in 1965 and administered by the CSIC, with headquarters in Seville. It studies and preserves a protected area of vital biological importance within the Doñana National Park, in Almonte. Unlike the rest of the park and its surroundings, which are controlled by Almonte's council and Andalusian Junta, this biological reserve is under the Spanish government's control. They have a scientific collection of more than 100,000 species, making up almost 20% of the world's total vertebrate species.

==== La Semana de la Ciencia ====
This Science Week was launched by schools with the cooperation of the town council, the Junta, the CSIC, the Ministry of Equality and environmental organisations like Ecoembes. Experiments, layouts, lectures and workshops related to biology, physics, chemistry and maths are organised. Botany and virtual reality are the main disciplines. There is also an open laboratory in which citizens can present their scientific ideas, which are analysed and may end up becoming real measures and pilot projects.

=== Other scientific projects ===
Almonte hosted the Chicarra Sound Research Festival in 2023, with the participation of the councils of Almonte and Huelva and the group Refluxus. It is a scientific and artistic research about the effects of sound on society, co-founded by Danish researcher Jens Hauser. It was held at the theatre and focused on water, making the most of the town's unique environment embedded within the Doñana National Park. More than 30 scientists and artists from 15 different countries participated.

=== Military technology ===
Almonte is the only place in Spain where surface-to-air missiles can be launched. There is a 257-hectare facility and military training area founded in 1981 in a zone known as "Médano del Loro", in the westernmost tip of the coast. Many soldiers are posted to this facility for short-term training and the area appears pixelated on satellite maps, so as to provide privacy and keep it secret. The access to the beach from the road is restricted along a 2.5 km stretch. Patriot and Hawk are some examples of missiles launched from this facility.

== See also ==
- List of municipalities in Huelva
