= El Rocío =

- Village
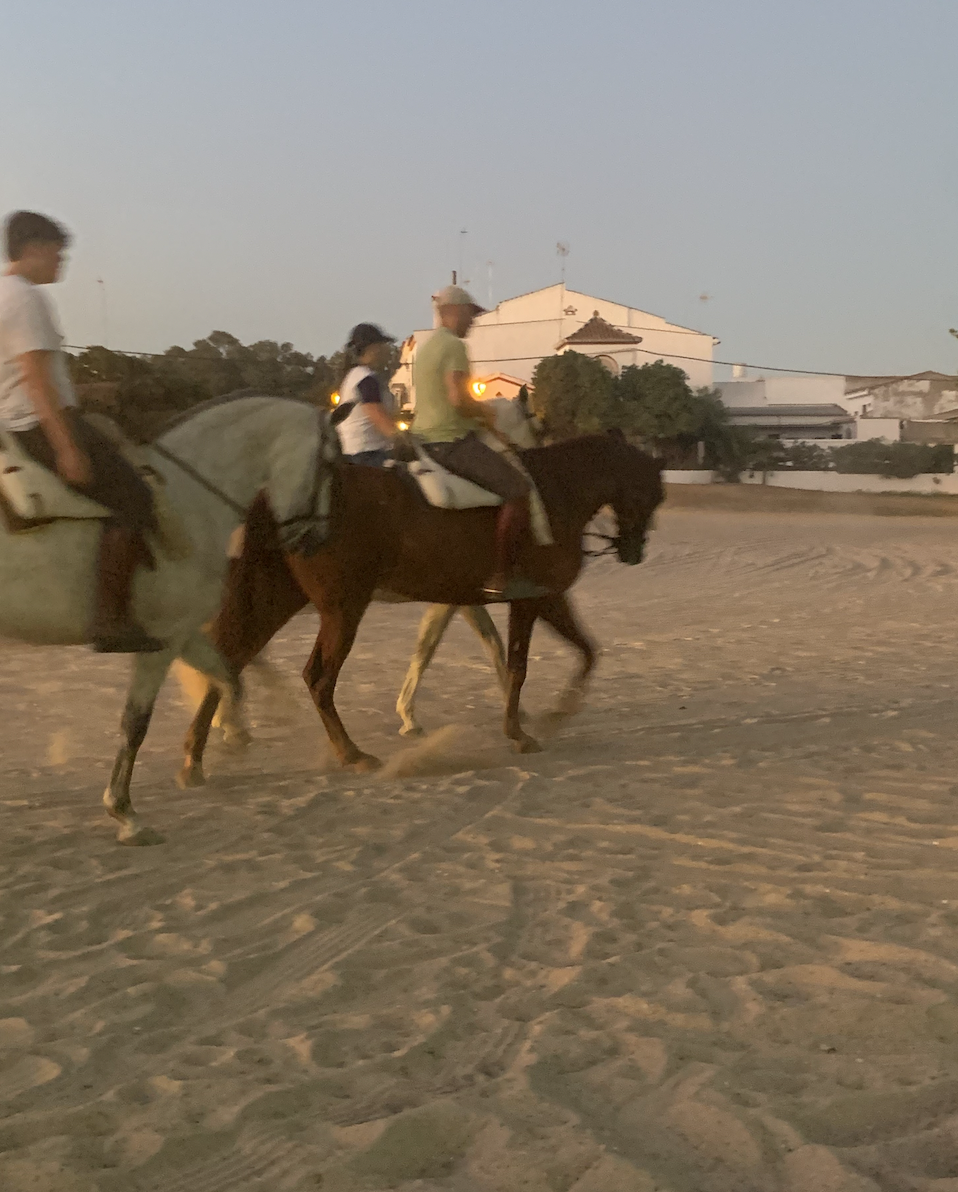
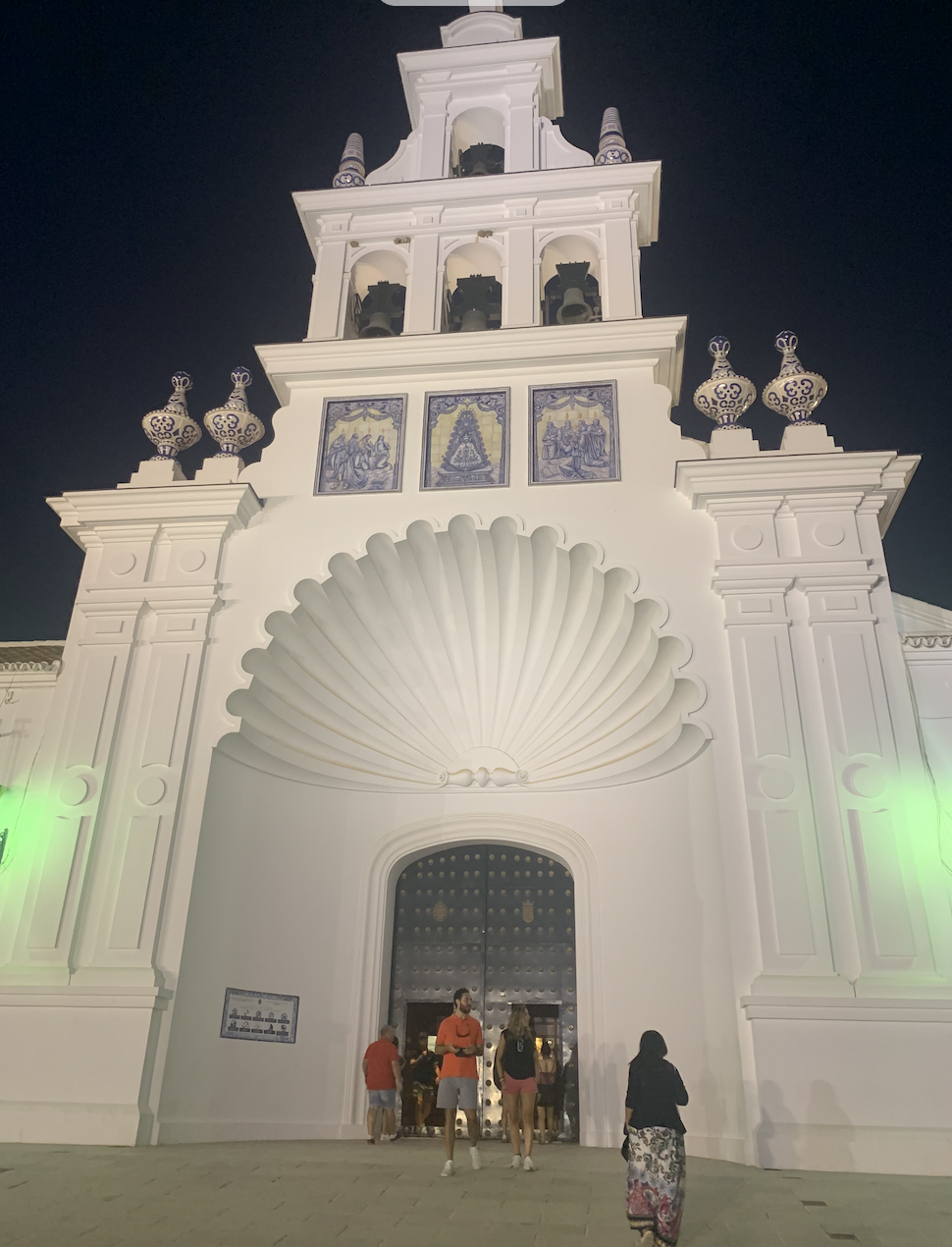
- El Rocío sights

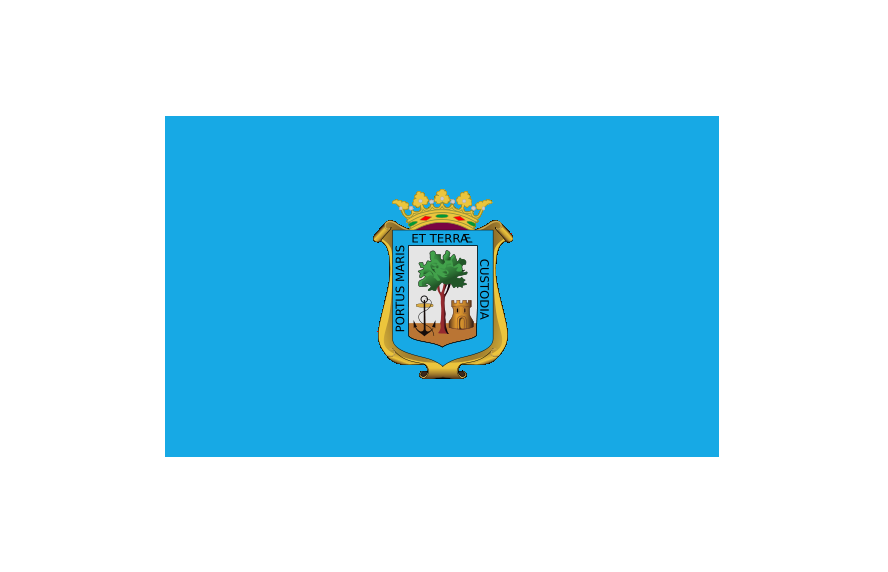
- Flag

- Location within Province of Huelva Location within Andalusia Location within Spain
- Coordinates: 37°7′54.77″N 6°28′57.04″W
- Country: Spain
- Autonomous community: Andalusia
- Province: Huelva
- Municipality: Almonte

Population (2021)
  - Total: 1,732
- Time zone: UTC+1 (CET)
  - Summer (DST): UTC+2 (CEST)
- Website: andalucia.org/listing/rocio/2816101 (in English) andalucia.org/listing/el-rocío/19717102 (in Spanish)

El Rocío (Spanish pronunciation: [el roˈθi.o], lit. 'The Dew') is a village in the municipality of Almonte found in southern Spain. It belongs to the province of Huelva, in the autonomous community of Andalusia.

El Rocío is situated between the cities of Huelva and Jerez de la Frontera. The municipality of Almonte covers 859 square kilometres (332 sq mi); However, El Rocío is a much smaller secondary nucleus. In 2021, the population of the village was 1,732.

The village has a significant religious heritage. Historically, national-catholicism has been used as a tool to express a political agenda in the south of Spain, resulting in various religious celebrations. El Rocío counts several religious celebrations throughout the years. The most famous is the Romería de el Rocío, an annual pilgrimage showcasing the religious roots of the village.

The village has few, if any, paved roads; its populace can be observed riding horses over the sandy makeshift roads.

== Geography ==
=== Topography ===
El Rocio is adjacent to the marshland of Madre de las Marismas del Rocio. The village has an average elevation of 9 metres (30 ft), minimum elevation of 0m (sea level) and maximum elevation of 20 metres (66 ft).

=== Hydrography ===
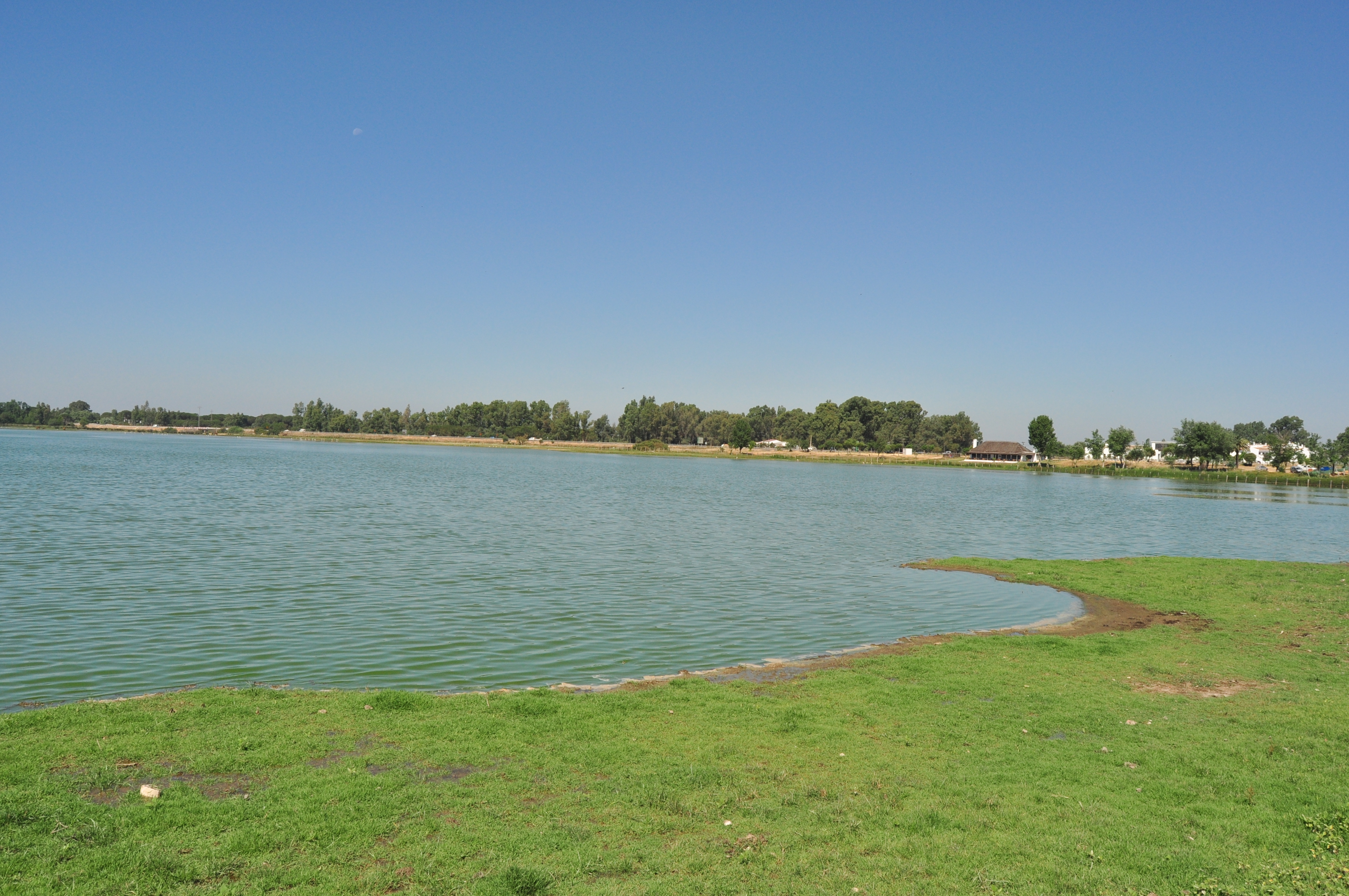
Marshlands

The entire region lies within the Andalusian Mediterranean Basin. The geomorphology of the coast around Huelva has been strongly influenced by rivers that flow south, such as the Guadiana, Tinto-Odial, Guadalquivir and Guadalete. Early pleistocene estuaries of the Guadalquivir and Guadalete rivers were connected by the existence of a channel located eastwards of Jerez de la Frontera. Towards the east part of the Gulf of Cádiz, the last glacial period, a 100-120m drop in sea level induced the incision of wide valleys by the main rivers. The rivers are short with steep banks, so flash floods can occur, but are less common than other areas of Andalusia The system of reservoirs Andévalo - Chanza - Piedras are the main distributors of sources of water for Huelva.

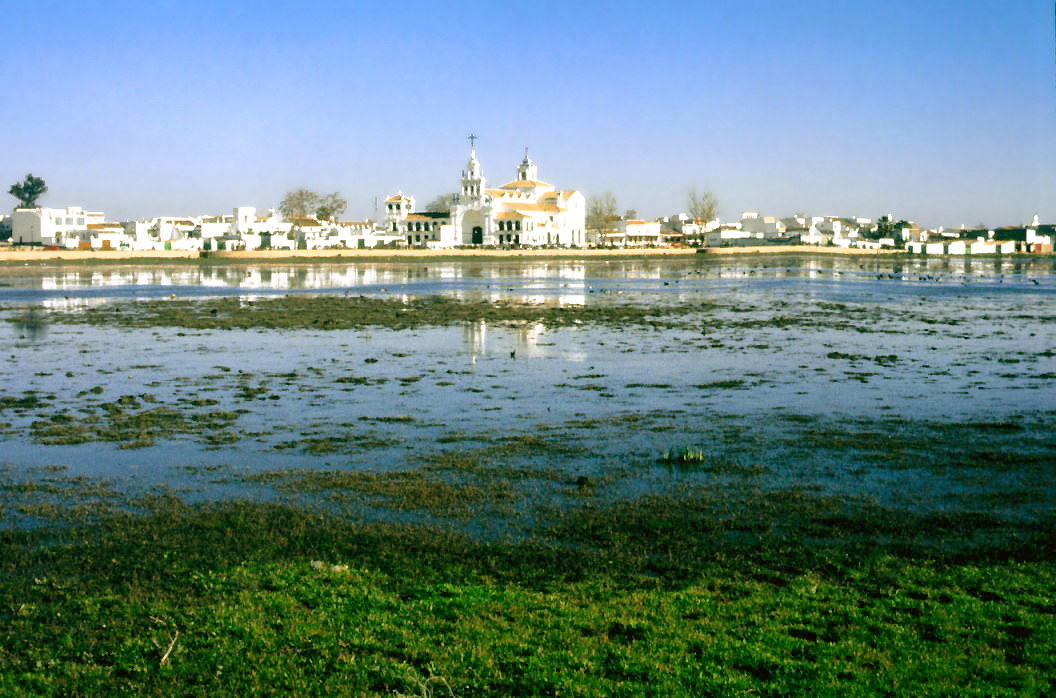
Marshlands and the Ermita

=== Climate ===
El Rocío has a subtropical Mediterranean climate. (Köppen: Csa) This is characterised by mild winters and warm summers. This weather is influenced by the proximity of Costa del Sol to the sea, the south-facing coast, resulting in the reception of sun rays that create this weather. El Rocío enjoys an average annual temperature of 18.16 °C (64.68 °F). Average rainfall is 506.8 millimetres (19.95 in), while hours of sunshine average above 2800 annually.

Climate data for Huelva, 1981–2010
Month	Jan	Feb	Mar	Apr	May	Jun	Jul	Aug	Sep	Oct	Nov	Dec	Year
Mean daily maximum °C (°F)	16.3 (61.3)	17.7 (63.9)	20.7 (69.3)	22.0 (71.6)	25.0 (77.0)	29.1 (84.4)	32.5 (90.5)	32.3 (90.1)	29.5 (85.1)	25.0 (77.0)	20.2 (68.4)	16.9 (62.4)	23.9 (75.1)
Daily mean °C (°F)	11.1 (52.0)	12.3 (54.1)	14.7 (58.5)	16.5 (61.7)	19 (66)	22.85 (73.13)	25.65 (78.17)	25.65 (78.17)	23.4 (74.1)	19.5 (67.1)	15.05 (59.09)	12.25 (54.05)	18.16 (64.68)
Mean daily minimum °C (°F)	5.9 (42.6)	6.9 (44.4)	8.7 (47.7)	10.3 (50.5)	13.0 (55.4)	16.6 (61.9)	18.8 (65.8)	19.0 (66.2)	17.3 (63.1)	14.0 (57.2)	9.9 (49.8)	7.6 (45.7)	12.3 (54.2)
Average precipitation mm (inches)	65.3 (2.57)	46.9 (1.85)	37.2 (1.46)	46.9 (1.85)	26.8 (1.06)	7.1 (0.28)	3.0 (0.12)	4.4 (0.17)	24.6 (0.97)	65.2 (2.57)	82.0 (3.23)	97.4 (3.83)	506.8 (19.96)
Average precipitation days (≥ 1 mm)	9.1	7.7	6.0	7.8	5.4	1.7	0.3	0.7	3.5	8.6	7.9	10.2	68.9
Source: World Meteorological Organization (WMO)

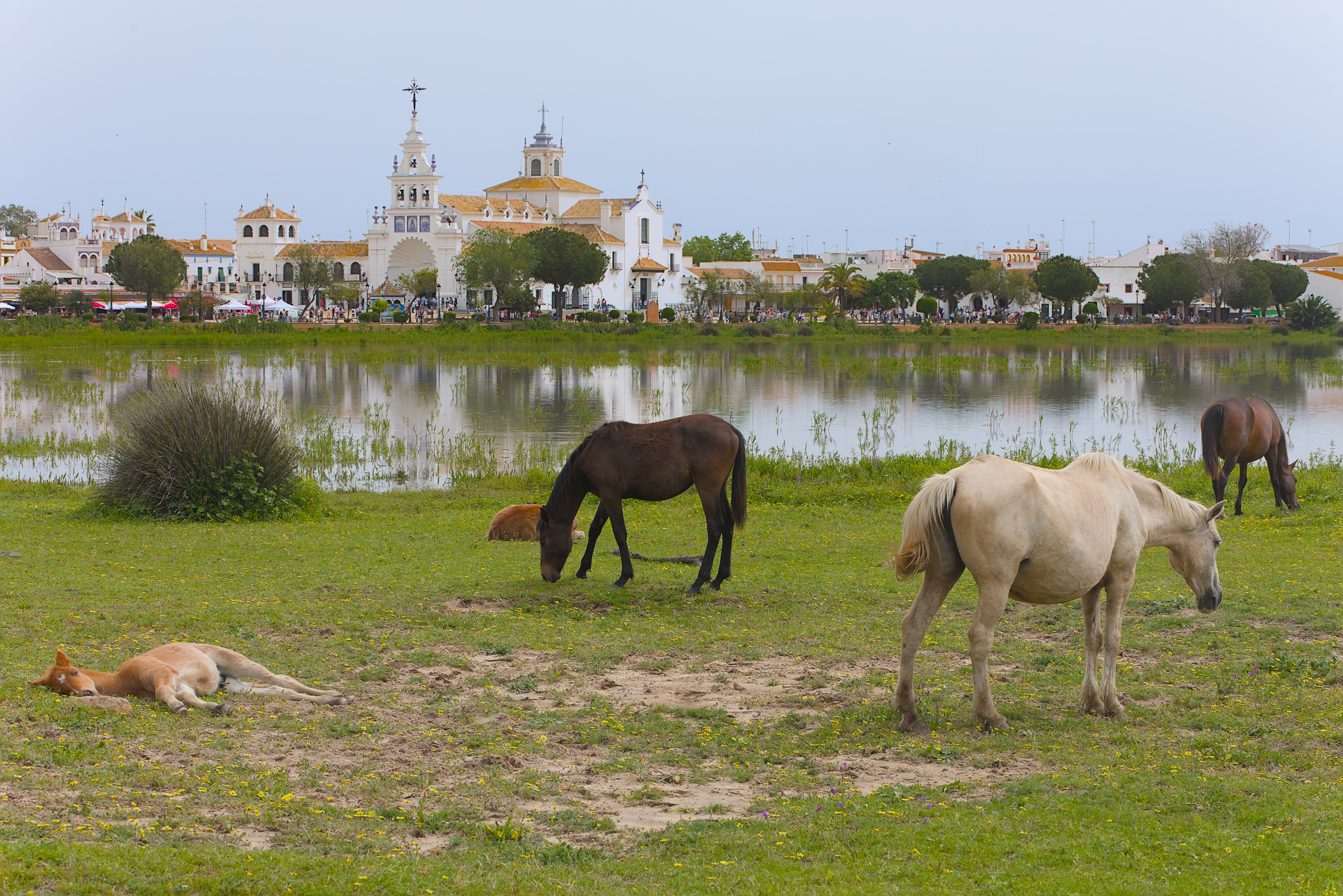
Wild horses of El Rocío

Population of Alamonte
Year	Pop.	±%
1842	3,779	—
1857	5,152	+36.3%
1860	4,850	−5.9%
1877	5,805	+19.7%
1897	6,037	+4.0%
1900	5,880	−2.6%
1910	6,627	+12.7%
1920	7,564	+14.1%
1930	8,063	+6.6%
1940	8,314	+3.1%
1950	9,187	+10.5%
1960	9,981	+8.6%
1970	11,666	+16.9%
1981	12,970	+11.2%
1991	16,164	+24.6%
2001	17,827	+10.3%
2011	22,243	+24.8%
2021	24,594	+10.6%
Source: INE

=== Flora and fauna ===
The Doñana park is a protected area part of the village full of rare wildlife, including the lynx, wild boar, wild horses, and a variety of water birds on the wetlands, including flamingos, herons, storks and egrets.

== Demographics ==
As of 2021 the village has 1732 inhabitants. During Pentecost celebrations, roughly a million people descend upon the village. In 2006, the village had 2182 private houses, 79 brotherhood houses, various hotels, a museum, a horse riding school and one camping ground. It also has gas station services as well as a bank.

=== Demonyms ===
Traditionally, the people of El Rocío have been called rociero/a, almonteño/a in the local vernacular. This has been observed in traditional "sevillana" songs since 1988.

Rociero/a refers to the Virgin of El Rocío, as El Rocío is where the traditional Romería del Rocío takes part. Previous to this, around the 15th Century, almonteño/a was more commonly used, as the area was known as Villa de Almonte.

Population of El Rocío
Year	Pop.	±%
2010	1'511	—
2015	1'342	—
2023	1'513	—
Source: City Population

== History ==
The events that led to the creation and development of the village of El Rocío date back more than 800 years, from the 13th Century up until present time. Due to its geographical location between the capital of the province, Huelva, and the Atlantic Ocean, the village has held a key role in maritime-terrestrial commerce, especially during the Late Middle Ages and the modern era. From the 17th Century onwards, interest in touristic, cultural and religious aspects of the village reached international projection, resulting in its special status and the village being protected as an area of Cultural interest of Spain in 1973. It also holds the title of a site of World Herritage given by the UNESCO in 1992, as well as had Pope John Paul II visit in 1993.

The first Hermitage of El Rocío was a simple Mudéjar building constructed some time after Alfonso's 1270 command, and built no later than 1300. The statue of Our Lady of El Rocío certainly dates back to this building, though its precise date and origin are a matter of some controversy.

=== Early modern age ===
The settlement originally arose as a religious pilgrimage destination in the 16th Century. During a pilgrimages in the 15th Century, individuals decided to construct a temple in honour of legends, apparitions and inventions pertaining to the Virgin of El Rocío. During this era, Alfonso X of Castille reigned. Historical documents evidence the first hermitage was mandated to be constructed by Alfonso X after the conquest of the Niebla territories in 1262. The legends surrounding this deity aim to explain the impact and existence of Our Lady of the Altamonte marshlands.

During the 1700's the 1755 Lisbon earthquake impacted the village heavily destroying its main landmark the Ermita of El Rocio.

=== Contemporary Era ===
The village was left practically abandoned in 1810, after the invasion of France. That same year, on the 17th of August, in Almonte, the french general Pierre D'Osseaux was executed, Napoleon sent soldiers to reinforce the area as a consequence. In this time, the villagers pleaded to their virgin of El Rocío to protect them, as they could not survive another invasion. Two days later, when the soldiers found themselves in the neighbouring village of Pilas, they turned around and never reached Almonte, which is why the villagers decided to celebrate each 19 August El Rocío Chico, attributing their protection to their religious patron. In the mid-19th Century the population nucleus had approximately 30 established huts. They were very basic rural, agricultural and livestock buildings, used as dwellings. A maximum of 50 huts is estimated by 1999. The huts began as shepherds' shelters and became established later on. They were built from local vegetation and earth. During the 1960's the Ermita was rebuilt following the Lisbon earthquake, leading to its closure for more than a month.

During the 1900s, 9 brotherhoods already held pilgrimages each year during the Romería. Villamanrique de la Condesa, Pilas, La Palma del Condado, Moguer, Sanlúcar de Barrameda, Triana, Umbrete, Coria del Río and Huleva. On the 8th of June, 1919, the canonic coronation of the Virgin of El Rocío took place, by Cardinal Alaraz, in front of more than 25,000 visitors and villagers. In 1925, the first telephone line was installed in the village, with four-hundred posts spanning from Almonte. Seven years later, the first national school opened its doors. In 1926, the town all ordered the protection of the marshlands, as well as called for regulations regarding cattle and other farm animals. In 1927, the Town Hall commenced works on a path from Almonte, which would turn into a main road 30 years later. Notably, in 1953, Francisco Franco visited the church. In 1958, the A-483 road finished getting paved, connecting Almonte to El Rocío, and opened to the public, doubling the annual visitor count for the pilgrimage to 60,000 people, while in 1960 the number of brotherhoods affiliated rose to 32.

Modernly, there are now few traditional huts left, and there have been changes in construction style. However, the remaining huts have barely been modified to the present day. Despite this, many of the traditions and cultures established in early years have persisted, with celebrations staying the same, and buildings remaining with an old-style to them. Additionally, the number of people visiting the village for their annual pilgrimage hit one million for the first time in 1980, and continues to slowly increase until present time. by 2004, the number of affiliated brotherhoods was 102.

== Landmarks and places of interest ==
=== La Ermita de El Rocío ===
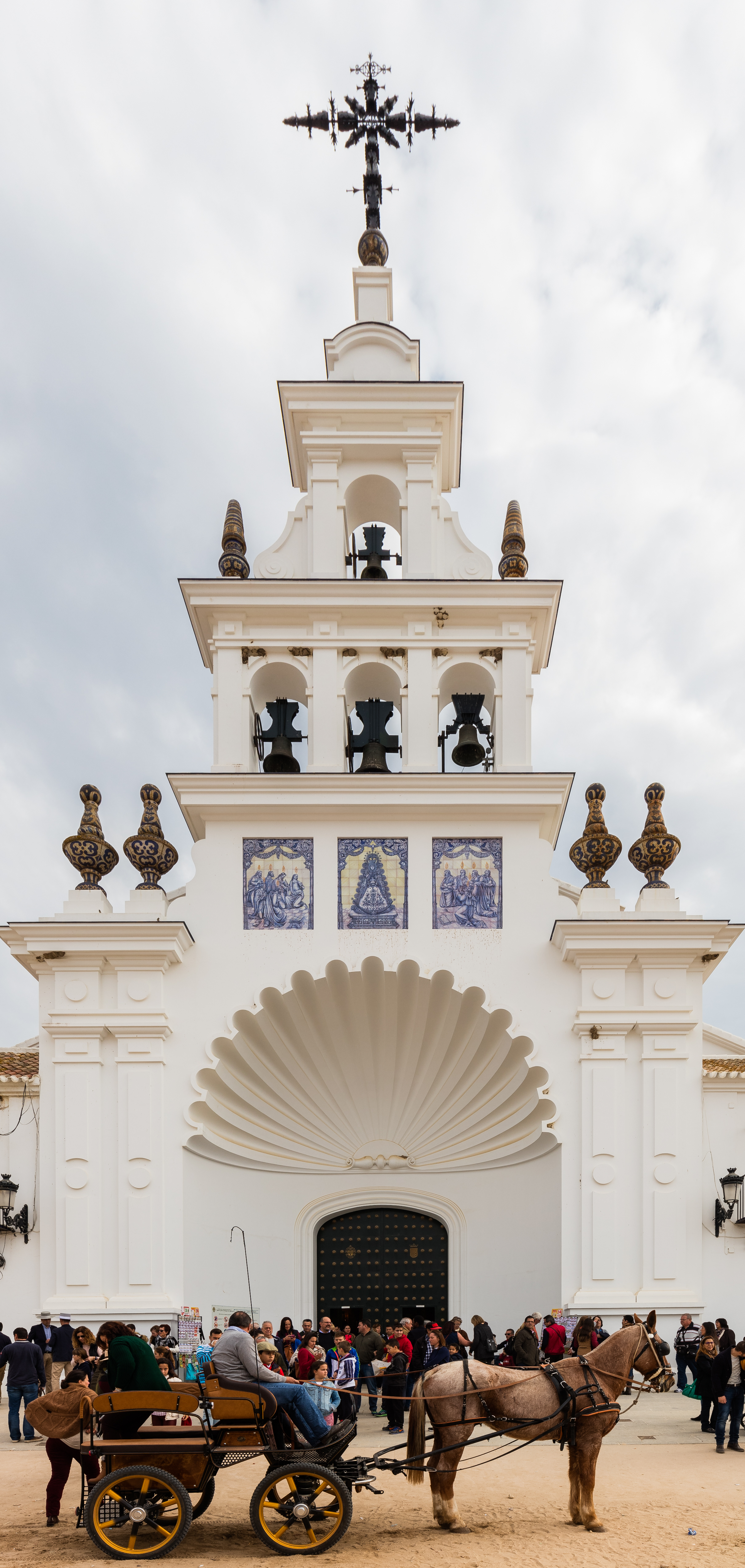
Front view of the Ermita

This landmark dominates the town square. Destroyed in the 1755 Lisbon earthquake, it was rebuilt in the 1960s. Inside is the wooden figure of the Virgin of El Rocio. It is the centre of the village and the hub for all of its religious celebrations.

=== Chozo El Toruño ===
In the Plaza of the Acebuche, the last vestige of architecture in El Rocío marshlands can be found. these depict the huts that were built entirely with local plant materials such as chestnut, and mud walls. These huts were seen around the early modern age, with remnants in the 19th century.

=== Sala de Velas ===
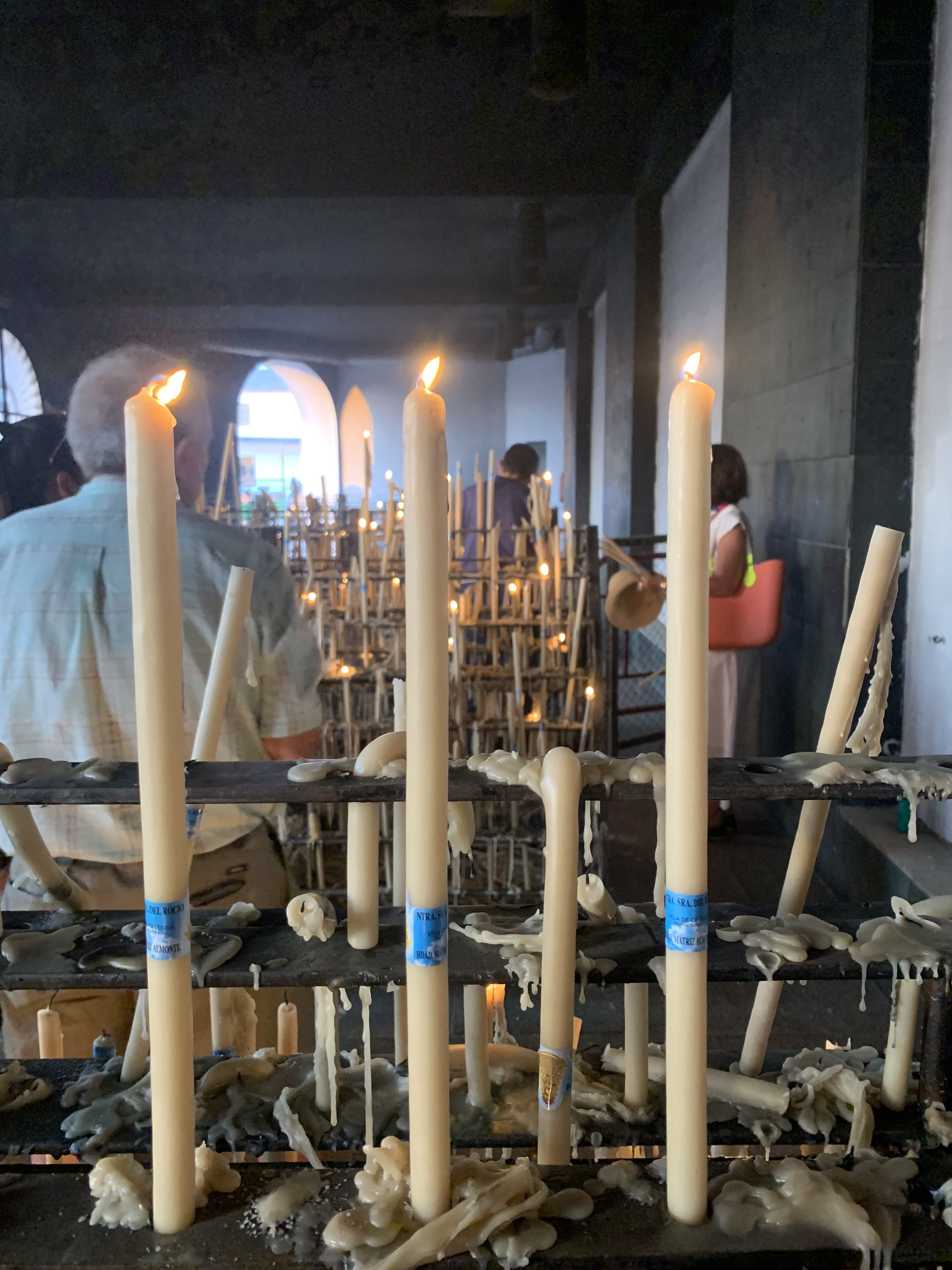
Candles lit in the Sala de Velas

As seen in most churches, individuals can light electric candles inside. However, there has been an increasing demand for the ability to light candles within the church. Therefore, a small room at the lake side of the church, called Sala de Velas (room of candles) was created for those wanting to light a wax candle. They cost 50 cents each and can be bought at the kiosk next to the Ermita. The ceilings and walls are stained black with smoke from the candles lit here every year.

=== Centro Ornitológico Francisco Bernis (Ornithology centre) ===
There can be many species of birds observed in this ornithology centre at any time of the year. The centre is dedicated to the scientific study, conservation and protection of birds found throughout the village. Visitors can enjoy sights of birds such as:

- Flamingos
- Ducks
- Spanish imperial eagle
- Ibis
- Herons

The centre is equipped with telescopes and binoculars for visitors to use. The ground floor has information panels to involve children and adults. It is located on Calle Sanlúcar.

== Transport ==
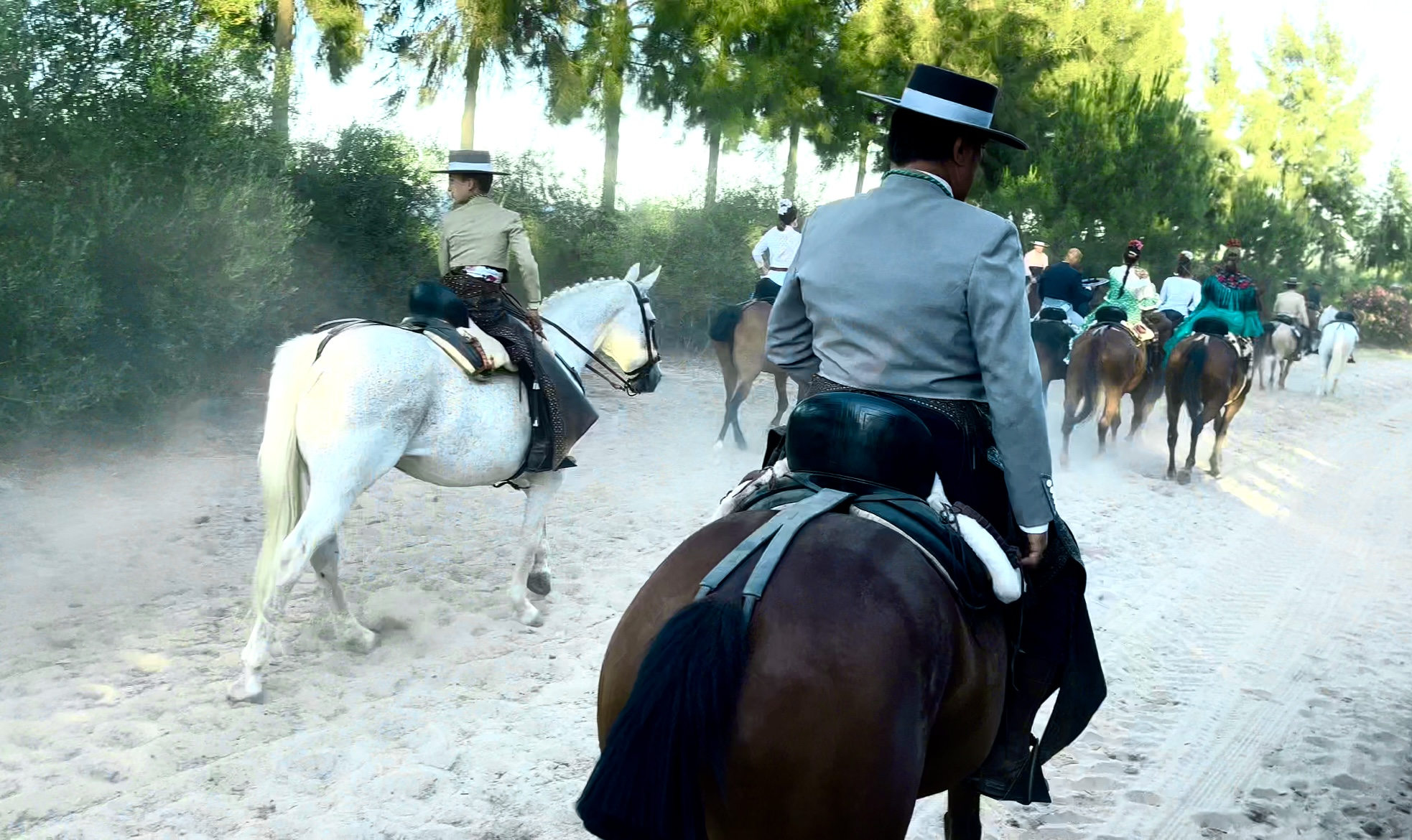
Horses as transport and the roads of El Rocío

Most of the villagers move around the village by horse, where you can tie your horse to any wooden rail with a sign saying "Reservado Caballos" (Reserved for Horses). Most of the roads are sandy and unpaved, as they are easier on the horse hooves, but cars can be used on these roads. Most houses have stables for personal horses.

=== Bus ===
The city hall uses the private company Damas to provide bus rides to reach the village. The bus runs from Almonte and Matalascañas, with an intermediate stop in El Rocío.

=== Car ===
Although the roads are unpaved the village can be reached from Huelva and Seville. Cars usually take the A-49 freeway and take exit 48 towards autonomous road A-483.

== Culture ==
=== Religion ===
The town has very strong religious roots, with the Ermita del Rocío as the main landmark in the Village. There are sisterhoods and brotherhoods based around the celebrations of the Romería de El Rocío. Each Brotherhood devotes itself to the Virgin of El Rocío.

A full annex of the brother hoods can be found here: Annex of Brotherhoods of El Rocío.

Pictures of Ermita del Rocío
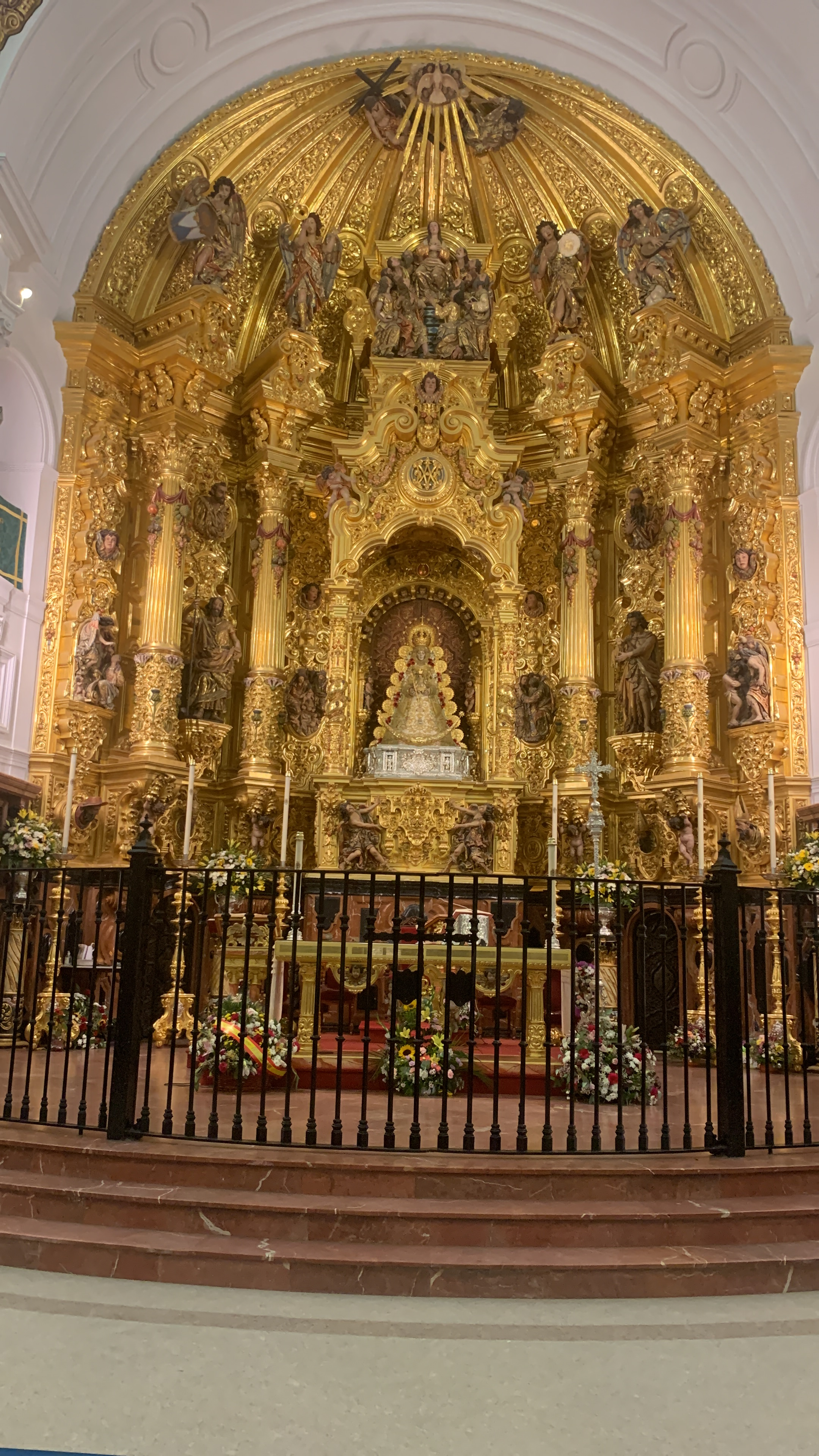
Inside the Ermita

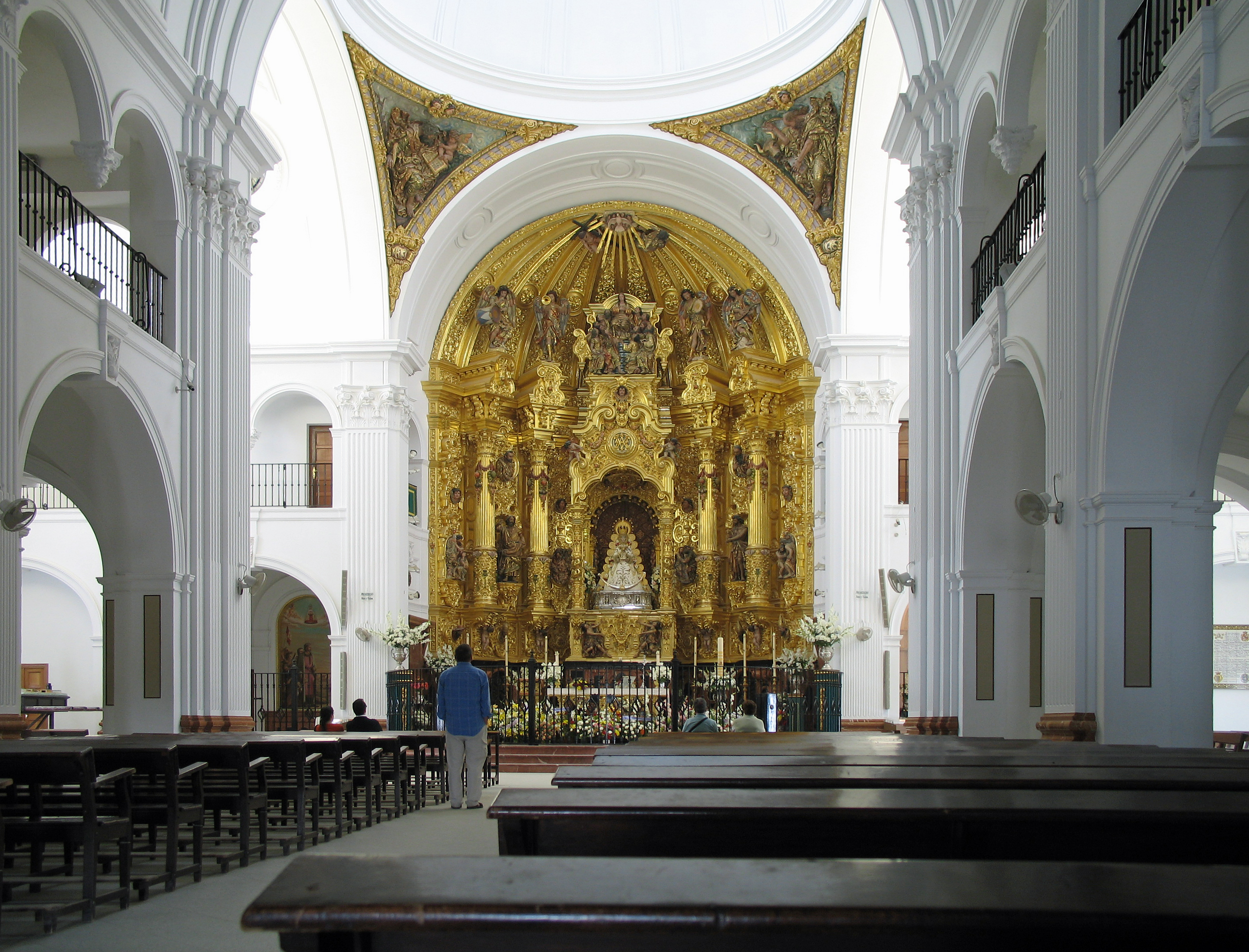

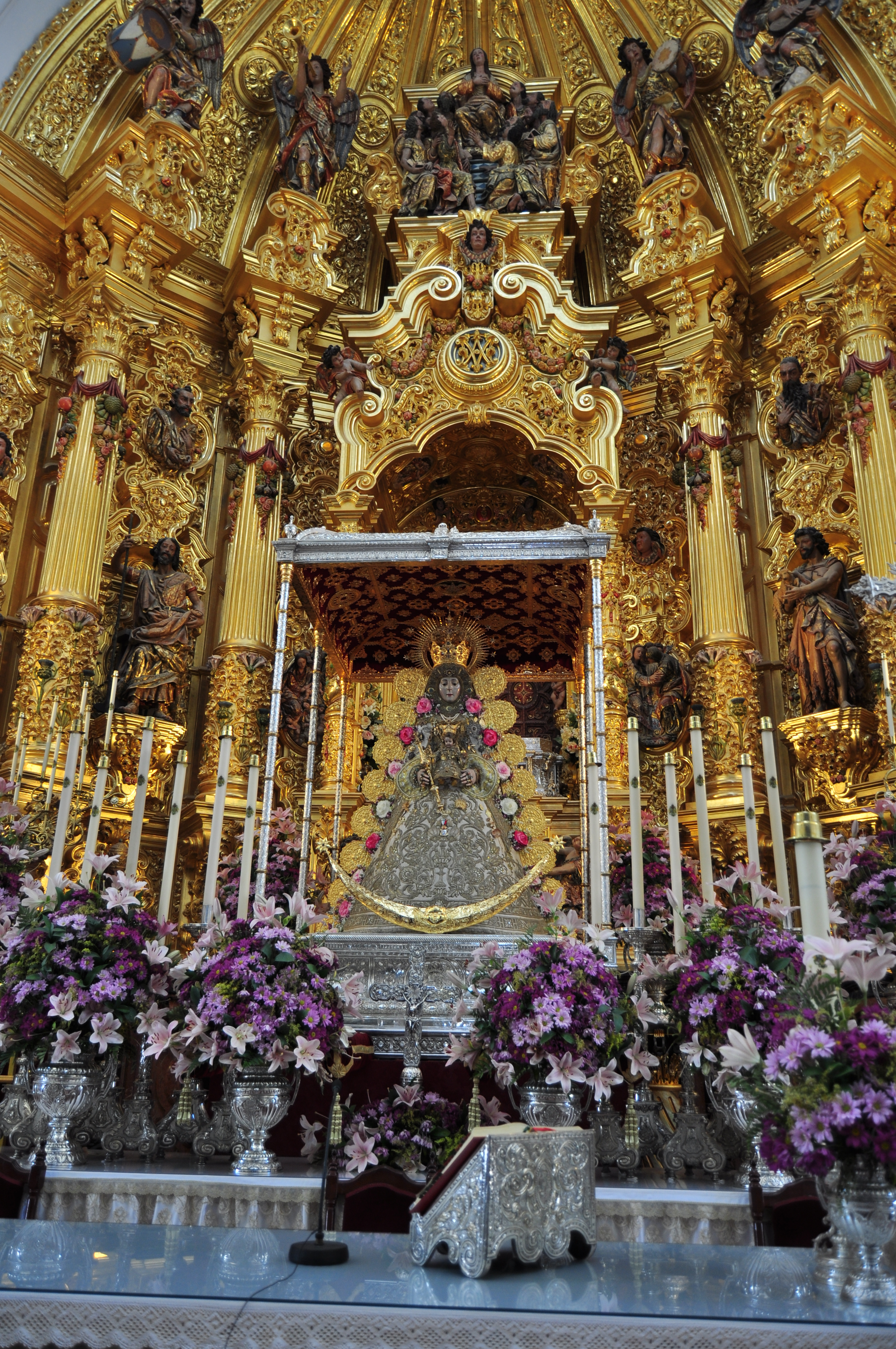
Close up of the Virgin

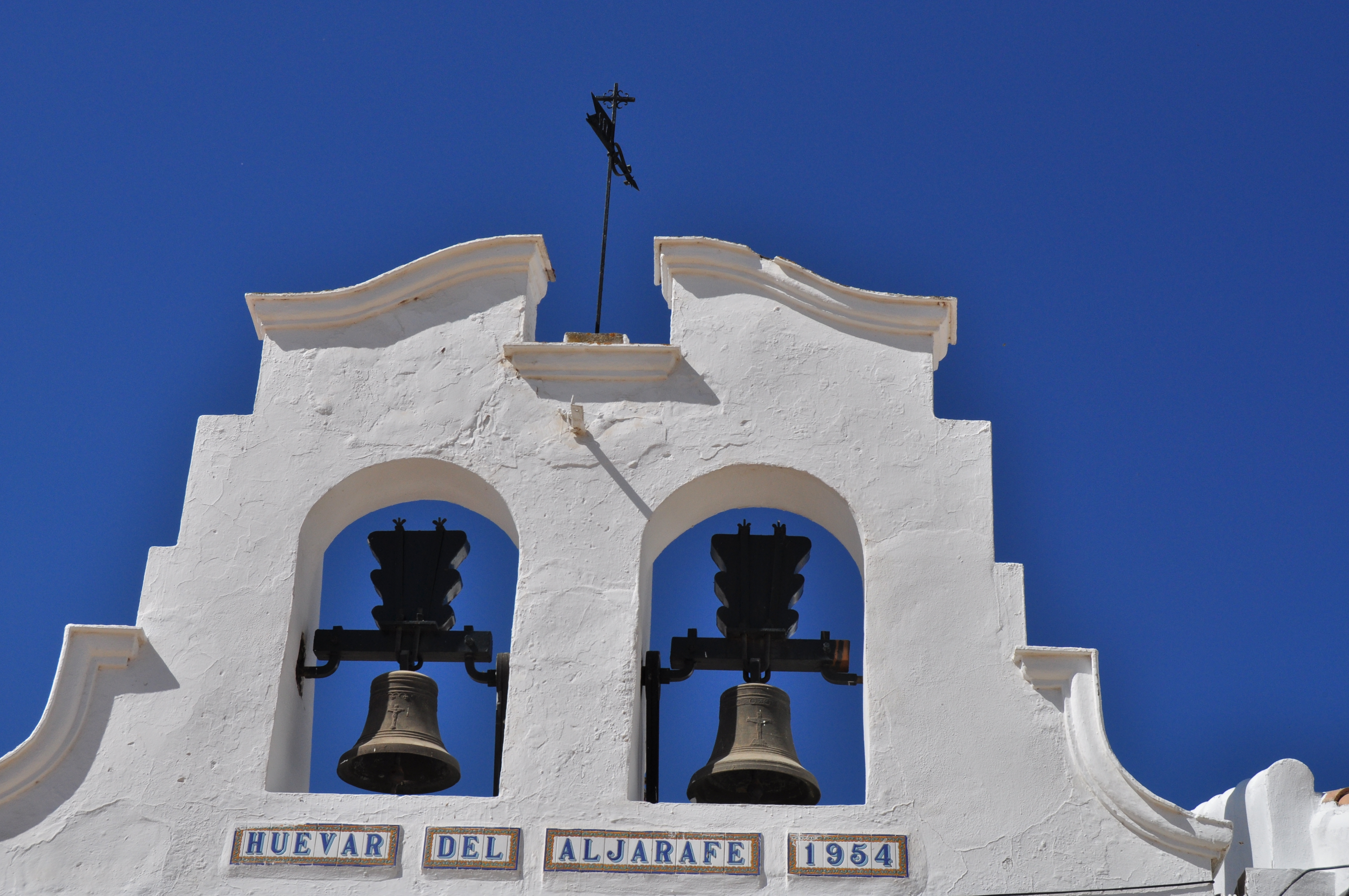
Outside of the Building

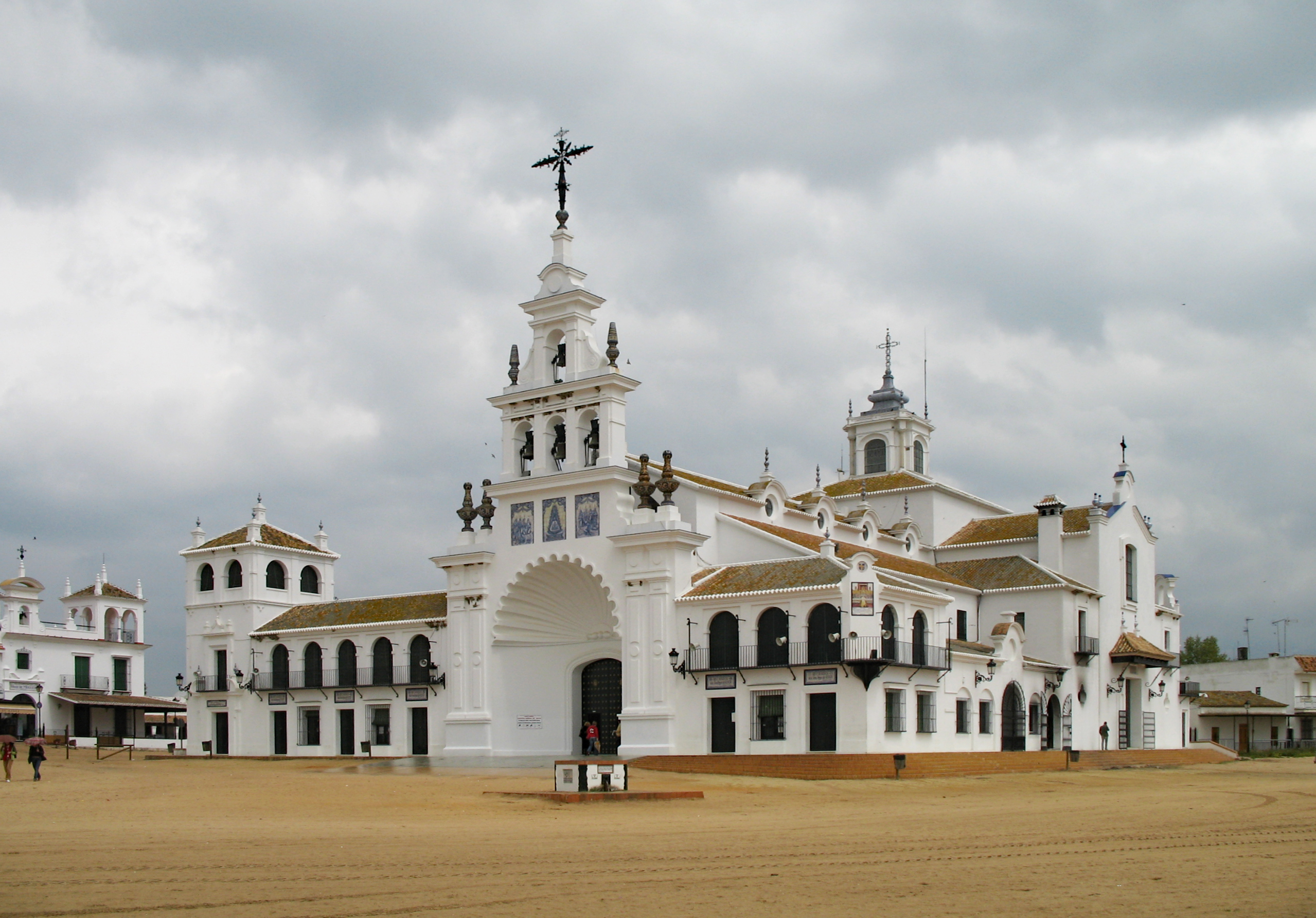
Outside of the Ermita

=== Festivals ===
The village enjoys their main festival: El Rocío pilgrimage. It attracts nearly a million people from across Andalusia and the country, and beyond, while more than 100 brotherhoods participate. Every Andalusian city, town and village enjoys its own pilgrimages.

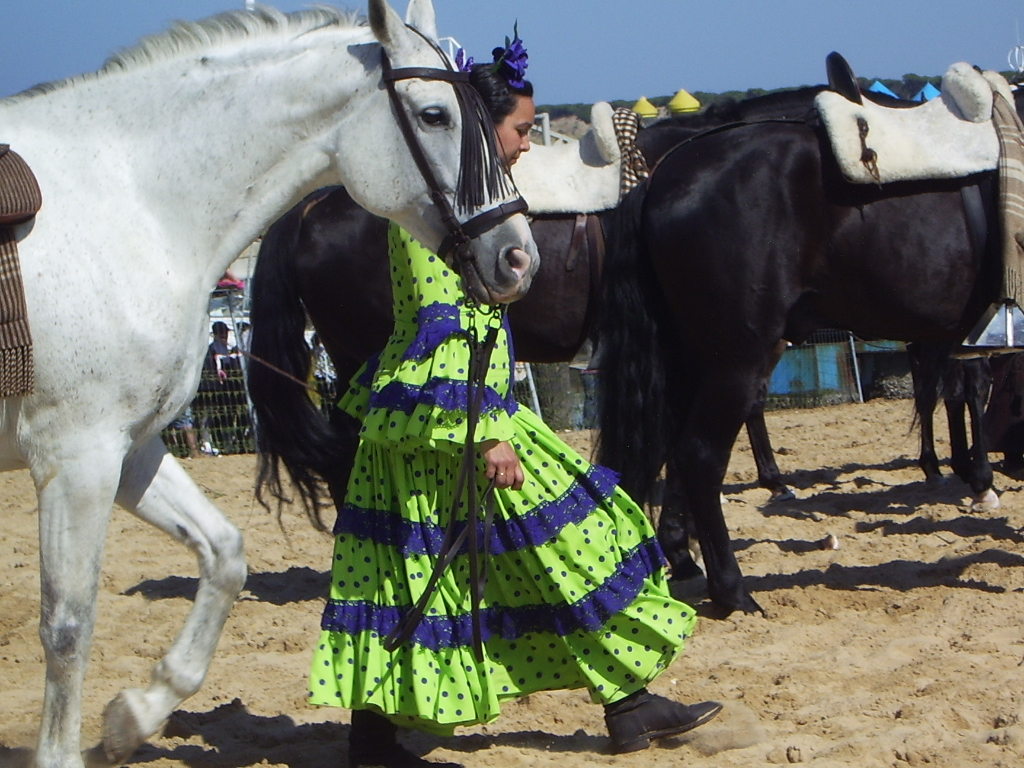
Typical dress and transport in the Pilgrimage (2009)

The pilgrimage follows on from Semana Santa (Holy Week), (March/April) and the various spring ferias (fairs) celebrated around Andalusia, in which Seville's April Fair is the biggest. The villagers of El Rocío celebrate these typical festivals and travel to the respective cities to do so. The pilgrimage takes place over the weekend before Pentecost Monday, the seventh weekend after Easter Sunday.

In these festivals, people sing rocieras, flamenco style songs about pilgrimages. It commences at midday the Saturday before pentecost. in that moment, the Brotherhoods present themselves in front of the sanctuary, in order of their antiquity. The pentecost Sunday, at 10am, there is a celebratory mass. The following Monday the processions and carrying of the Virgin begins.

The festival used to be celebrated on the 8th of September, however, the Virgin of El Rocío receives her nickname, "The white dove", as it marked the change of her celebrations to align with Pentecost celebrations.

=== Cuisine ===
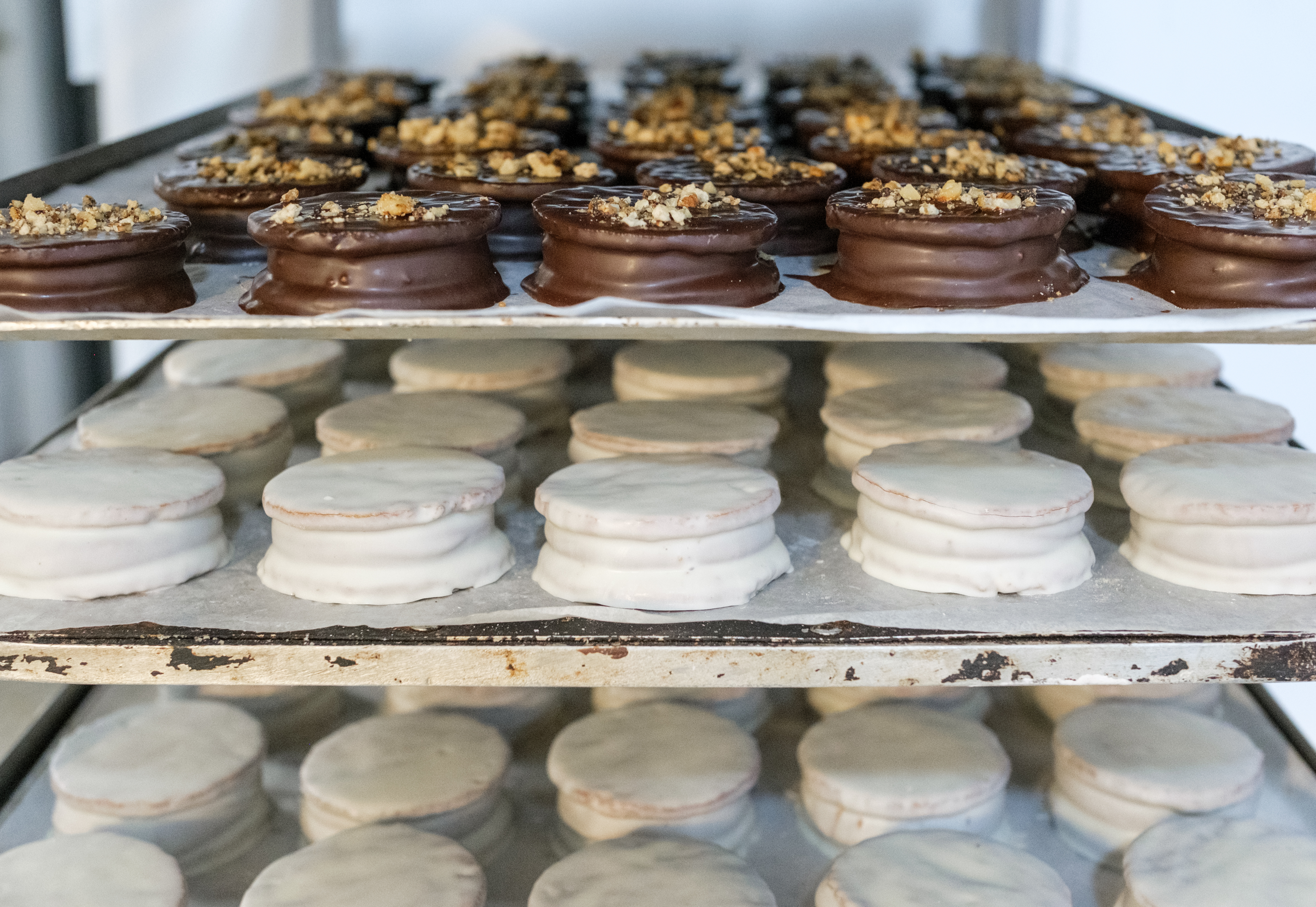
Typical Alfajores desserts.

the Region of Almonte is mainly famously known for its wine. The main elements composing the cuisine if primal food, such as fruits, meats and local fishes. Mixed with local honey, wines, oils and fruit juices, the traditional dishes are created. the main plates from the region are Rabbit stews, spotted weakfish with almond sauce and Alfajores. However, the most beloved dish is a traditional plate of lamb chops. For side dishes, potatoes are popular, where Papas rocieras are known to be commonly served, though the recipe varies from household to household. Papas Rocieras are simply fries with Aioli sauce. As is traditional of many villages in the south of Spain, the recipes are simple and feature rices and other legumes.

== Education ==
- CEIP Doñana El Rocío (Spanish)
- Colegio Virgen del Rocío (Spanish)

== Tourism ==
The village is especially popular with tourists from Spain itself, with many coming to the village for religious tourism. however, tourists from the United Kingdom, Ireland, Sweden and Germany are also present, but less common, as is the case throughout the Costa del Sol. Sights in or near El Rocío include:

- Ermita de Nuestra Señora de El Rocío
- Sala de Velas
- Souvenir Shops
- Chozo el Toruño
- Casa de la Cultura
- Centro Ornitológico Francisco Bernis (Ornitology centre)

== See also ==
- Virgin of El Rocío
- Romería de El Rocío
- Bay of Cádiz
