= Hermitage of El Rocío =

Coordinates: 37°07′50″N 6°29′06″W

- Ermita de El Rocío
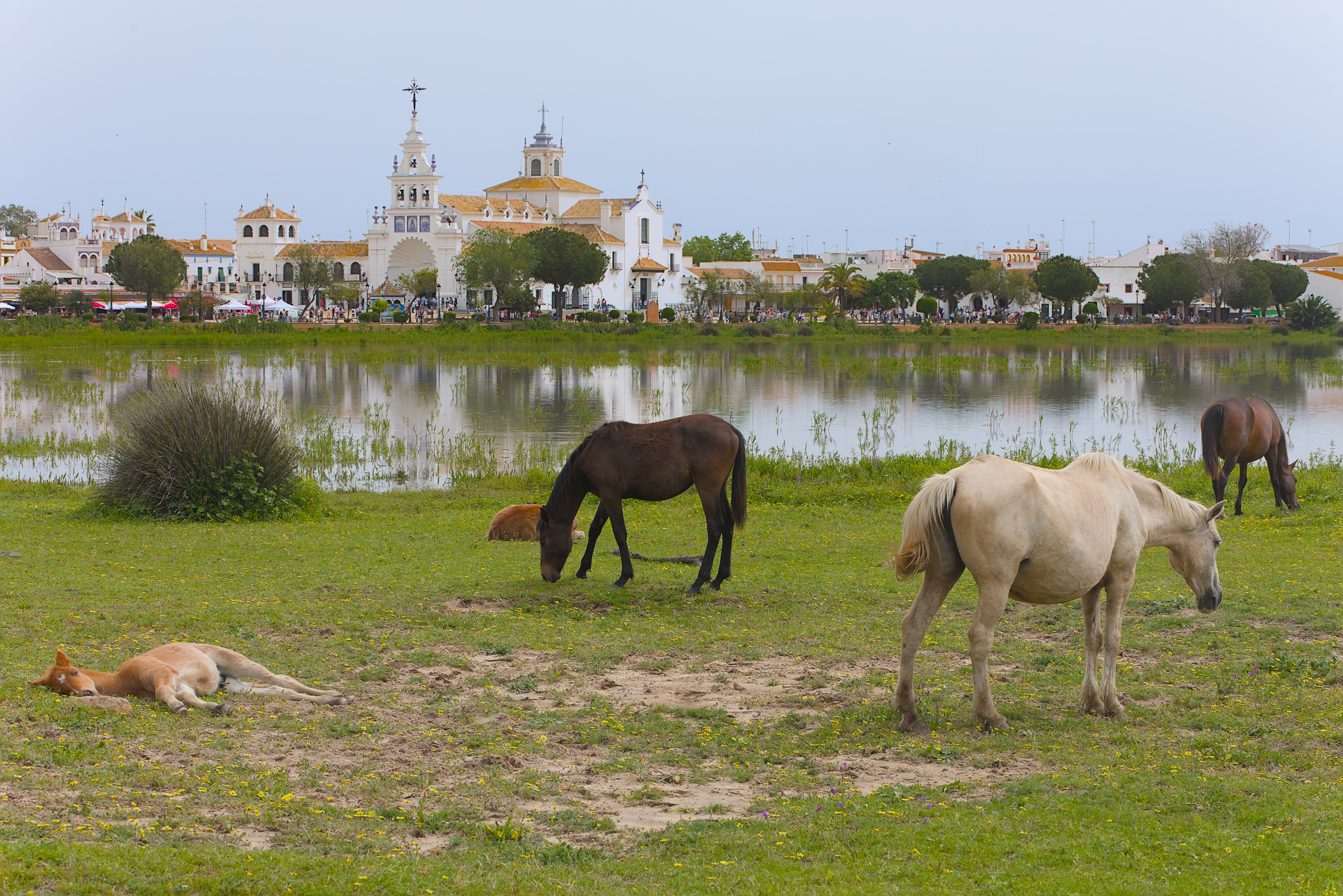

- Location within Spain
- Alternative names: Ermita de la Virgen del Rocío; Hermitage of the Virgin of El Rocío

General information
- Type: Hermitage
- Location: Almonte (Province of Huelva), Spain
- Construction started: 1964
- Completed: 1980
- Inaugurated: 1969

Design and construction
- Architects: Antonio Delgado y Roig and Alberto Balbontín de Orta

References
- El Nuevo Santuario de la Virgen del Rocío, hermandadrociosevilla.com, retrieved 2010-04-14, for the dates of construction.

The Hermitage of El Rocío (Spanish: Ermita del Rocío or Ermita de El Rocío) is a hermitage at El Rocío in the countryside of Almonte, Province of Huelva, Andalusia, Spain. The hermitage is home to the Virgin of El Rocío (Spanish: Virgen del Rocío), a small, much-venerated carved wood statue, and is the destination of an annual procession/pilgrimage on the second day of the Pentecost, known as the Romería de El Rocío, connected to the veneration of the Virgin of El Rocío; in recent years the Romería has brought together roughly a million pilgrims each year.

Although there has been a hermitage on this site for centuries, the present hermitage building was designed by architects Antonio Delgado y Roig and Alberto Balbontín de Orta, designed in 1961 and built in stages over the next two decades.

== History ==
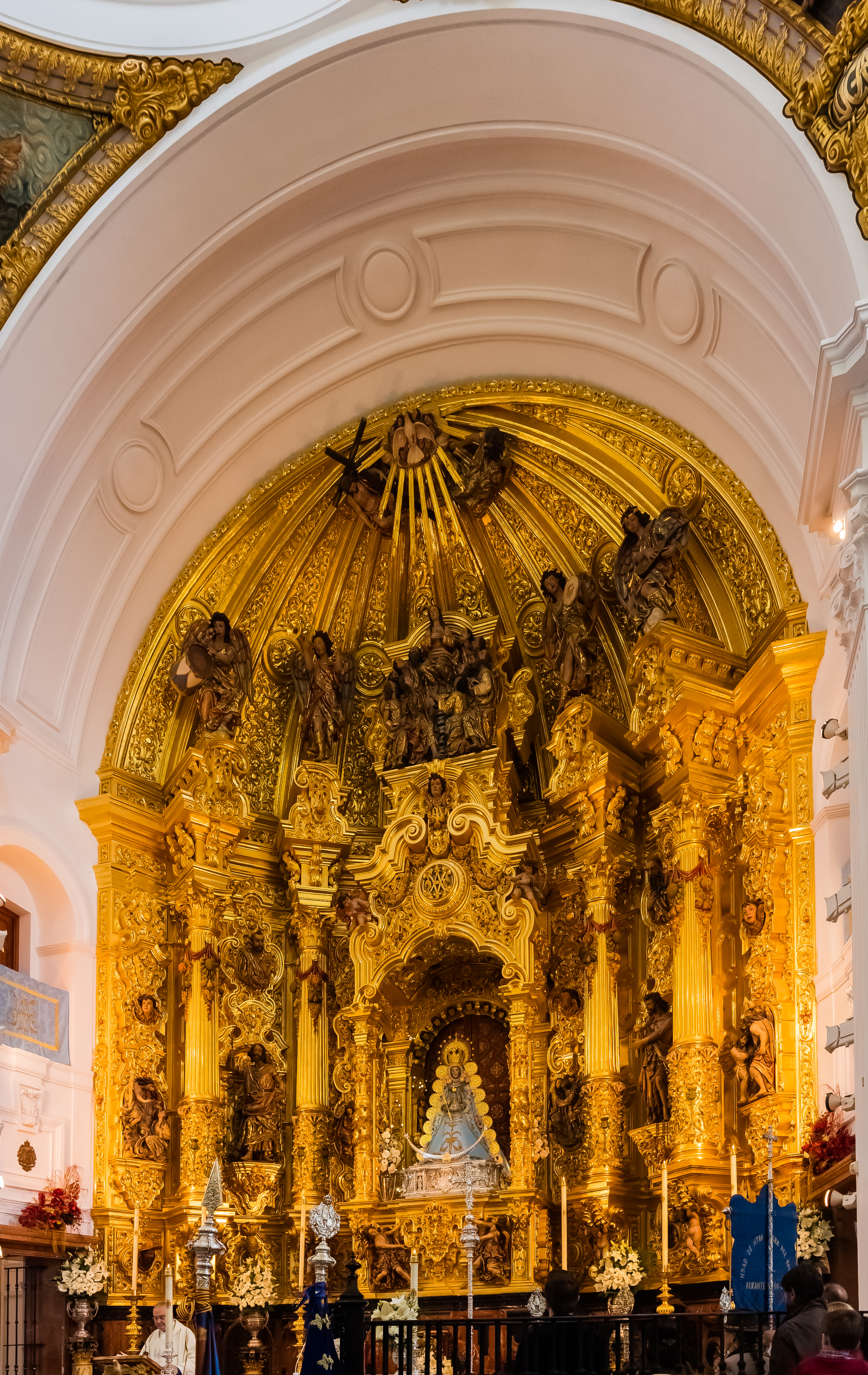
Altar of the Virgin of El Rocío

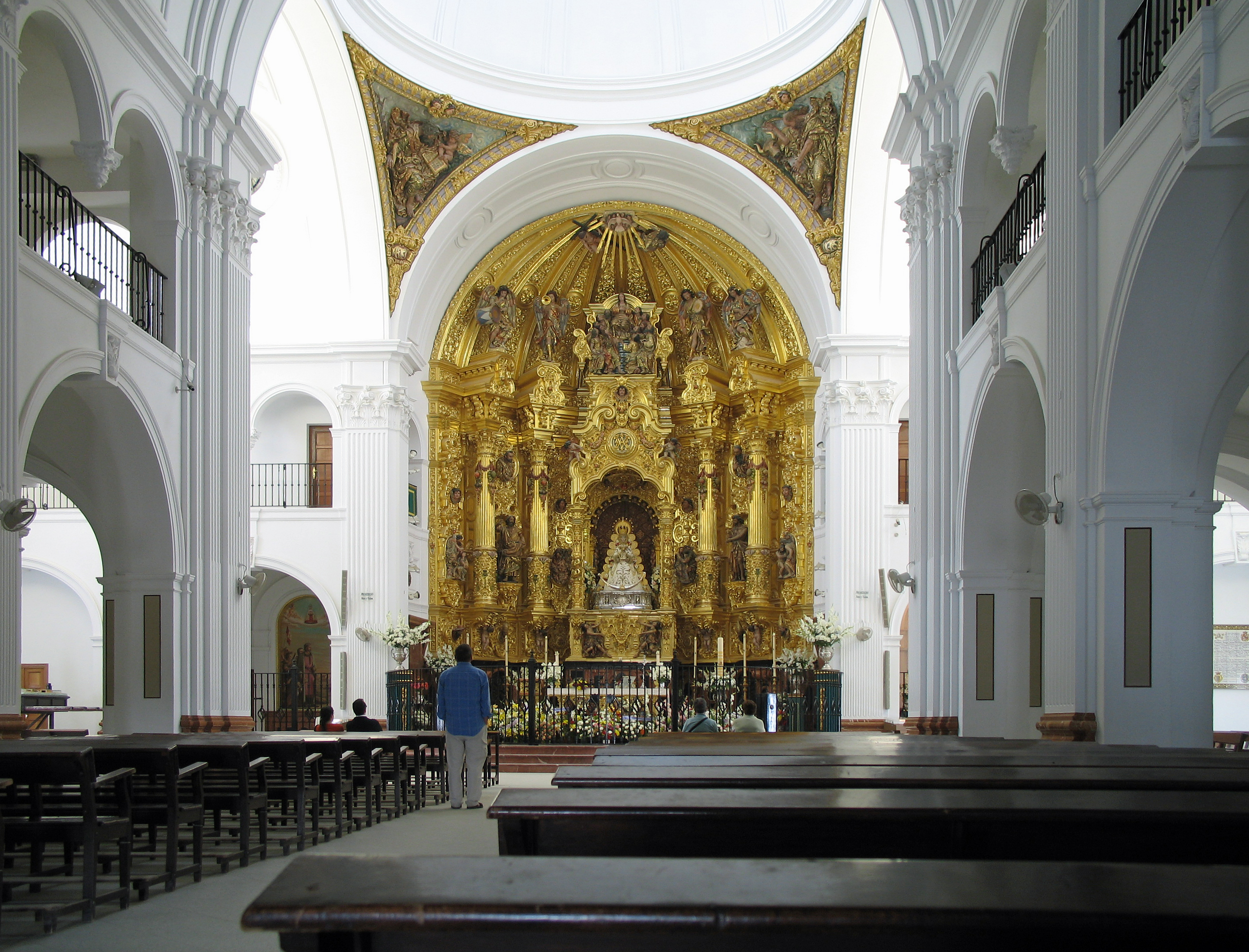
Interior of the hermitage

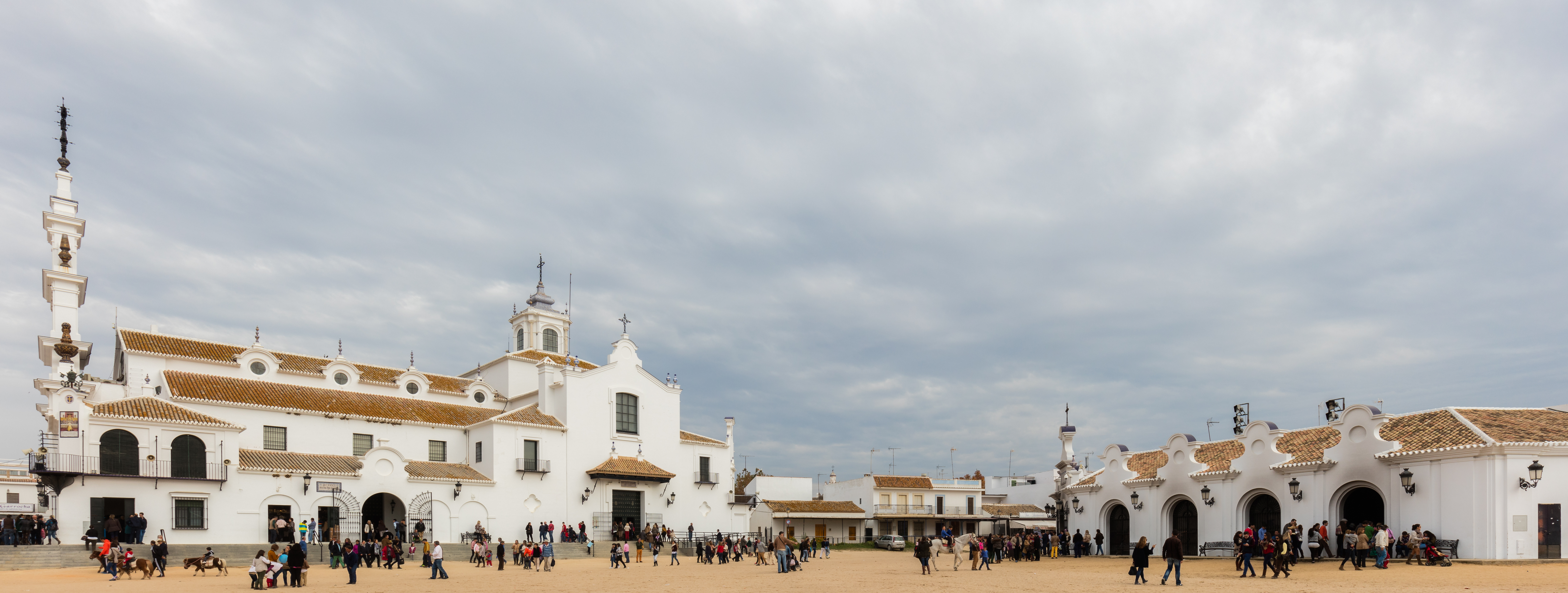
View of the surroundings

The historical chronicles say that King Alfonso X of Castile (Alfonso the Wise), present on the site in 1270, ordered the construction of a hermitage dedicated to the Virgin Mary in the place then known as Las Rocinas, which had recently been reconquered from the Muslims who at that time still ruled much of southern Spain. The same chronicles say that attracted by the beauty of the area and its abundant deer, Alfonso established himself a hunting preserve there in 1269, first known as the Coto Real del Lomo del Grullo y Las Rocinas, which largely coincides with today's Doñana National Park or Coto de Doñana.

The first Hermitage of El Rocío was a simple Mudéjar building constructed some time after Alfonso's 1270 command, and built no later than 1300 (Juan Infante-Galán Zambrano says 1270–1284, but also says that the first firm documentary evidence of the hermitage dates from 1337). The statue of Our Lady of El Rocío certainly dates back to this building, though its precise date and origin are a matter of some controversy.

The original hermitage underwent repairs in 1612–1614, 1635, and 1658 and survived until the 1755 Lisbon earthquake, which left it a ruin. After the quake, the Virgin of El Rocío was brought into the village of Almonte, where it remained for two years while a second hermitage was built. This second hermitage was restored in 1919 under the supervision of José Luís de Cózar, but was demolished in 1963 to make way for the present structure.

The present hermitage building was designed by architects Antonio Delgado y Roig and Alberto Balbontín de Orta. They presented their plan (in competition with two other proposals) in 1961; it was approved 24 May 1963. The statue of the Virgin was moved to Almonte 16 June 1963 in preparation for the demolition of the second hermitage, where demolition began in July. The cornerstone of the new building was laid 26 January 1964; a provisional chapel was constructed and in service 33 days later. Major construction continued until 10 January 1969, and after torrential rains prevented a planned benediction on 15 March, the benediction of the new hermitage took place 12 April 1969.

However, even in 1969 the building was not complete in all respects, and some further construction, including the upper portion of the façade, continued until 1980, when the cross was placed atop the building. The cross itself, by Sebastián Conde, dates from 1692, and was previously associated with the Barrio Santacruz in Seville.

Pope John Paul II visited El Rocío 14 June 1993.
