= Romería de El Rocío =

Pilgrimage in Spain

Coordinates: 37°07′53″N 6°28′59″W

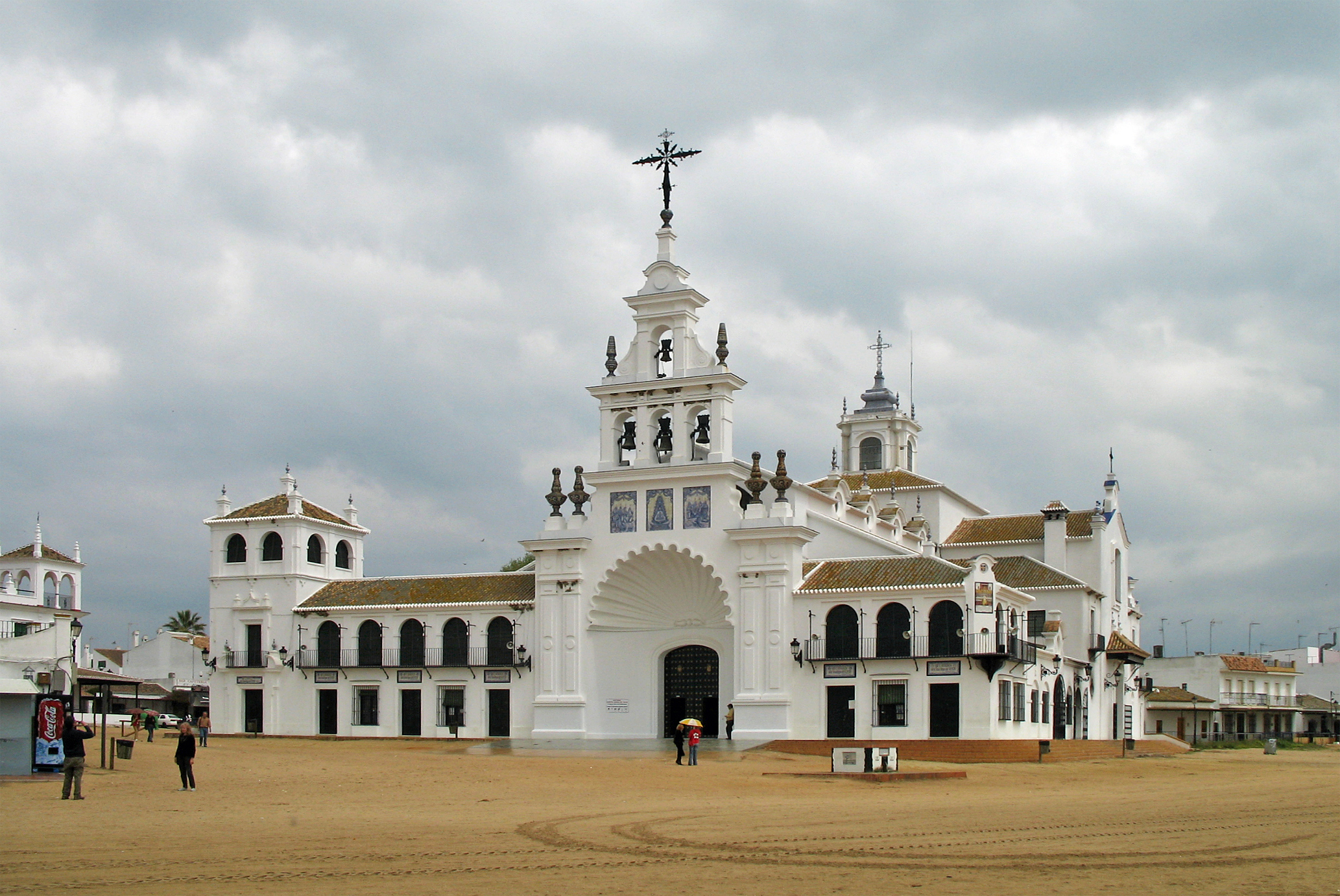
- Hermitage of El Rocío
- Frequency: Annual
- Locations: Almonte, Spain
- Inaugurated: 1653
- Patron: Virgin of El Rocío

Fiesta of International Tourist Interest
- Designated: 1980

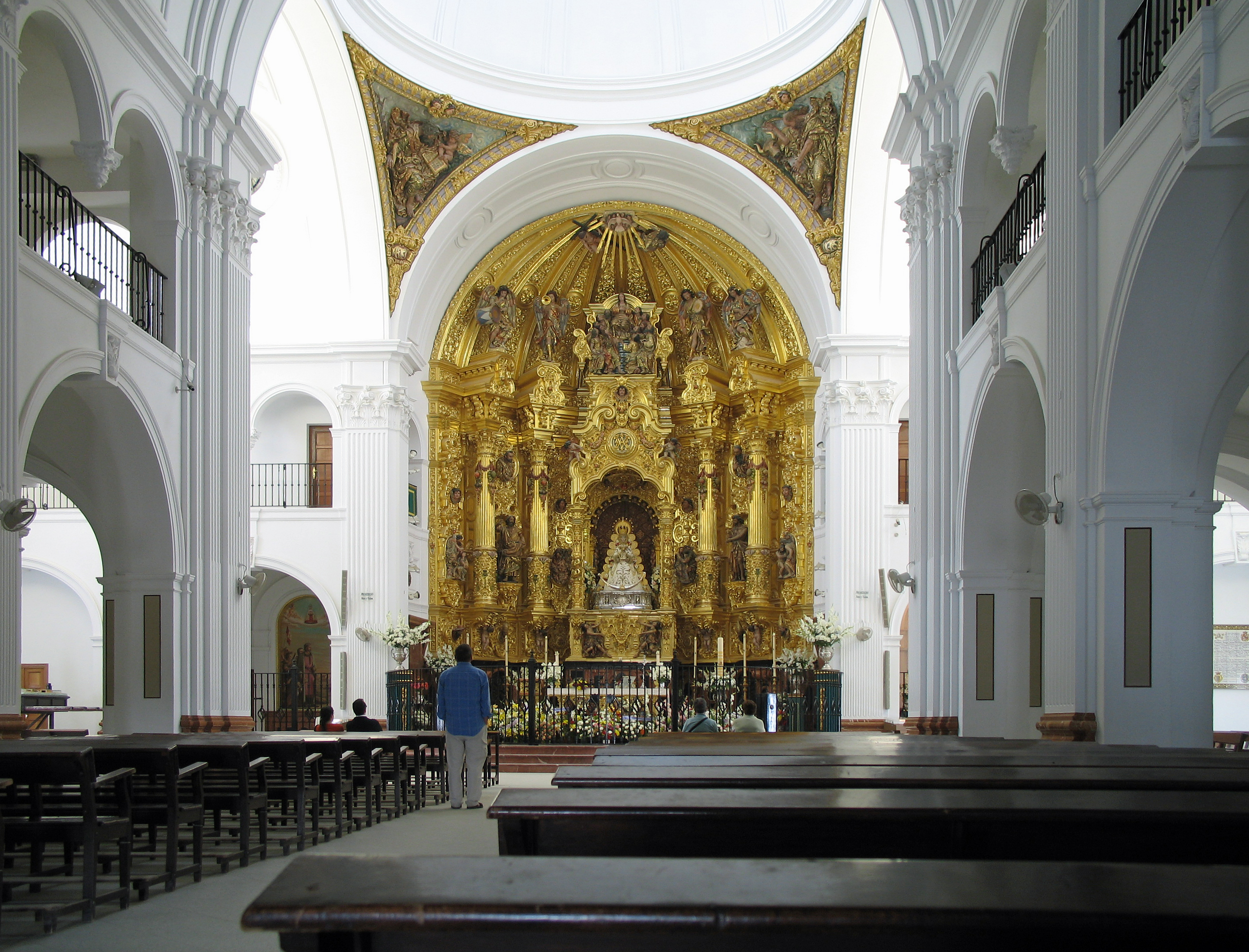
Interior of the church

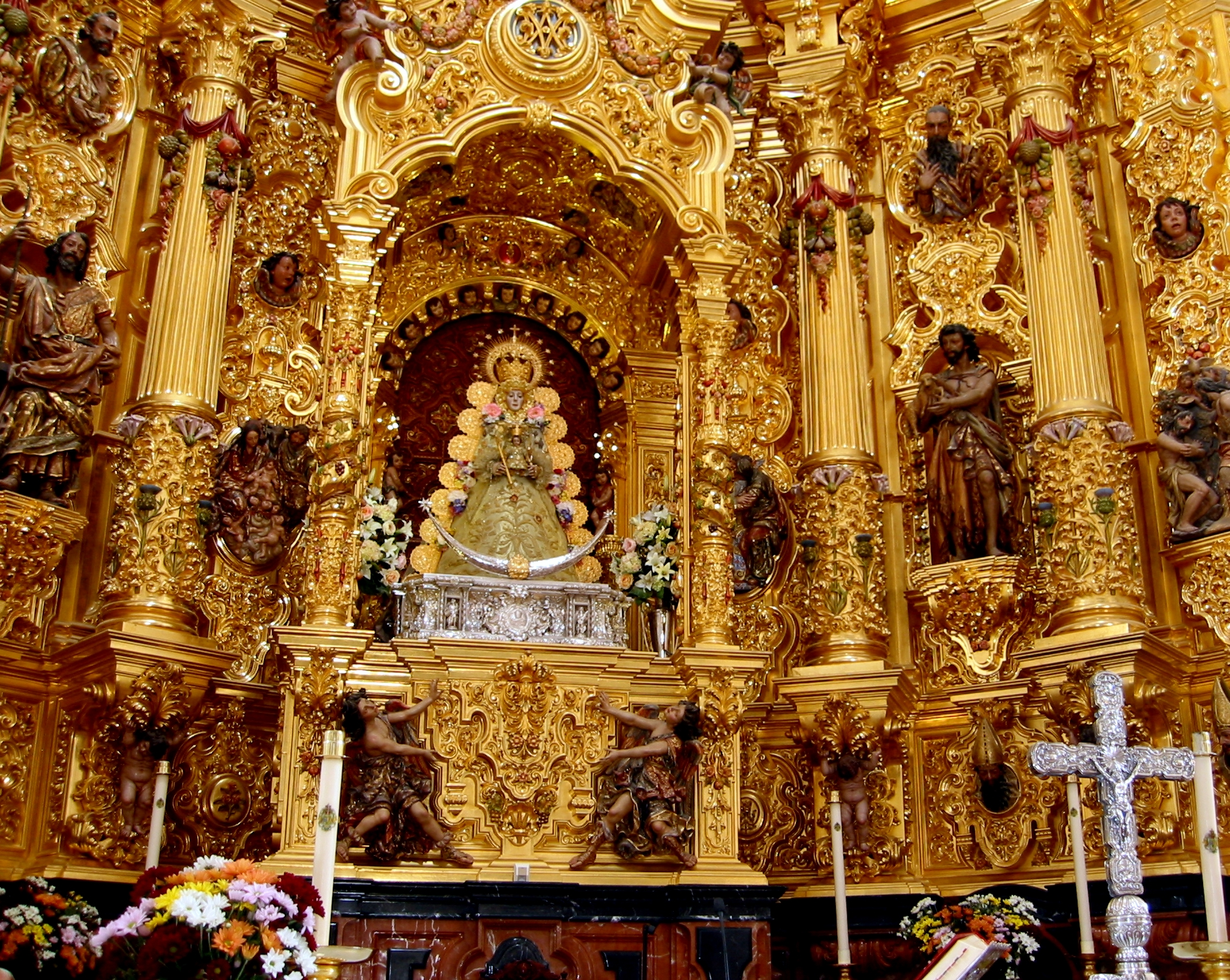
The Virgin of El Rocío

The Romería de El Rocío is a procession/pilgrimage on the second day of Pentecost to the Hermitage of El Rocío in the countryside of Almonte (Huelva), Andalucia, Spain, in honor of the Virgin of El Rocío. In recent years the Romería has brought together roughly a million pilgrims each year.

The pilgrimage dates from 1653, when the Virgin of Las Rocinas was appointed patron saint of Almonte. Originally it took place on 8 September. Since 1758, the Virgin has been known as the Virgin of El Rocío, and the pilgrimage has taken place on the second day of Pentecost.

== Structure of the pilgrimage ==
The romería as such begins on Sunday before Pentecost. However, pilgrims come from throughout Andalusia (and, nowadays, from throughout Spain and beyond), and typically travel an additional one to seven days beforehand, either on foot, on horseback or in horse-drawn carriages (or, nowadays, in some cases, modern modes of transport such as all terrain vehicles), generally sleeping outdoors. Many count this travel as the most important part of the pilgrimage.

The pilgrims travel in groups known as religious confraternities. They come from many directions: the Camino de los Llanos (Plains Way) from Almonte proper; the Moguer Way, from Moguer and Huelva; the Sanlúcar Way from Cádiz, crossing the River Guadalquivir at El Bajo de Guía; and the Seville Way.

The pilgrimage proper begins at noon or afternoon on the Friday before Pentecost. From then until nearly midnight of Saturday, each confraternity travels from their property in the village of El Rocío to the Sanctuary where they present their "Simpecado", their replica icon of the Virgin, the oldest confraternities proceeding first. Each bears an emblem of the Virgin del Rocío (Holy Mother) and is mounted on a cart pulled by animals (bulls, oxen or horses). Originally done on Saturday, since 2013 the confraternities presentation takes just two days to finish, with each of them led by the mounted section, musicians, leadership teams and the Simpecado cart or carriage. During all the presentations, following the prayer Hail Holy Queen, a representative of the delegation shouts a litany of praise and honor to Our Lady, ending with And long live forever the Mother of God! At midnight of Pentecost or late night of the Saturday before, it is the turn of the original confraternity, the Mother Confraternity of the Virgin of Rocio, based in Almonte, to carry their emblem to the shrine in like manner as those who earlier arrived during the last two days. This march, known as the Almonte Rosary ceremony, marks the climax of the presentations. The procession, which passes the village for the formal presentation of their Simpecado, which is hand carried, begins and ends from the sanctuary itself - the icon being presented to the shrine upon the confraternity's arrival earlier in the week.

At 10 a.m. on Pentecost Sunday, a Pontifical High Mass is said in El Real del Rocío (next to the Sanctuary), where the Virgin was crowned in 1919, where all the confraternities attend, followed by a second mass of thanksgiving to all those who assisted during the pilgrimages of the confraternities and a 3rd for members of the Civil Guard, with both masses held in the sanctuary building. On Sunday night, everyone prays the Rosary by candlelight, as each confraternity goes up to the flat of El Eucaliptal next to El Real del Rocío marching in celebration of the feast.

Finally, either at the late night hours or midnight, the Immaculate Conception Image of Almonte, its official replica, is brought to the Shrine from Donata Square, where the night Rosary prayer has been earlier held, at which point following this act the Almontese carry the Virgin of El Rocío out into the village streets joined by those who took part in the pilgrimage, as the image is carried to the various properties of the confraternities of the Lady of El Rocío before watching crowds, so that it can be honored directly by their members. The timing of this event differs from one year to the next, so there is always a certain element of spontaneity to this procession until it returns to the shrine, which constitutes the finale of the celebrations.

All the pilgrims begin to leave the village beginning on Pentecost Monday after the end of the midnight or sunrise procession.

== Attire ==
The pilgrims travel through the countryside, sometimes by cart or on horseback, in celebration of regional agrarian customs. Both the horse and the costume reflect the historic privilege offered the rural gentry.

Men wear a costume called traje corto consisting of striped pants (pantalón a rayas), a short jacket (chaquetilla corta), suspenders (tirantes), leather chaps (zahones), a wide brimmed cordoba hat (sombrero de ala ancha), riding boots (botas de montar). Women wear a costume called traje de faralaes. Women's attire varies more but usually consists of a flowing dress (traje de vuelos) with polka dots and ruffles (volantes), a fringed shawl (mantoncillos de flecos) and bracelets, loop earrings and flowers worn in the hair.

== Origins and brotherhoods ==
The earliest historical documentation regarding the Rocío is known from the Libro de la Montería, which King Alfonso XI ordered to be written. It lists only two places close to El Rocío, the primitive Hermitage of Santa María de las Rocinas and the Villa de Mures (currently Villamanrique). The Libro de la Montería in folio 292v says: La Xara de Mures, which is the Alxarafe [Aljarafe], is a good mountain of pig in yuierno"; the folio 294v states that: « En tierra de Niebla ay una tierra quel dizen las Rocinas et es llana, et es toda sotos, et ay siempre puercos… et señalada mjente, son los meiores sotos de correr cabo vn yglesia que dizen Sancta Maria de las Ro-çinas et cabo de otra iglesia que dizen Sancta Olalla » (English: "In the land of Niebla there is a land [place/area] called Las Rocinas and it is flat, and it is all groves, and there are always pigs...and the most important groves are the ones that run through a church called Sancta Maria de las Ro-çinas and through another church called Sancta Olalla").

At the dawn of the 15th century, a hunter from Villamanrique (which, at the time, was called Mures) named Gregorio Medina was in La Rocina on a hunting trip, and was lucky to find, amongst the howls of the dogs and in the hollow of a thousand-year-old olive tree, the sacred image of the Virgen del Rocío. The first reference to a Marian place-of-worship in the area dates to the first half of the 14th century, in Alfonso XI's Libro de la montería, in which to a "chapel of Sancta María de las Rocinas." In 1587, Baltasar Tercero Ruíz founded a chapel in the hermitage.

The original brotherhood of Almonte was documented by the scribe of Villa Almonteña, D. Juan Bautista Serrano, on 1 January 1640, by Juan de Medina "El Viejo". In 1653, the patron saint of the town of Almonte was proclaimed. The name Virgen del Rocío began to spread, to the detriment of the previous Santa María de las Rocinas. It is at this time that the first filial brotherhoods were founded, among which are those of Villamanrique de la Condesa and of Pilas.

Between the second half of the 17th century and the beginning of the 18th century, a series of brotherhoods emerged in towns near the village, such as La Palma del Condado, Moguer and Sanlúcar de Barrameda. Subsequently, Rota and El Puerto de Santa María also arose, disappearing soon after the latter aforementioned two during the Napoleonic Wars, to be re-founded later. Throughout the 19th century, four other brotherhoods emerged, in Triana, Umbrete, Coria del Río and Huelva.

Between 1880 and 1913, a time of great change in Andalucía, no new brotherhoods emerged; up to 110 sisterhoods developed, that currently remain today. In the 1910s, the brotherhoods of San Juan del Puerto (1913), Rociana del Condado (1919) and Benacazón (1915) were founded. Two periods of heavy filial foundings are also noteworthy in this time, the Second Republic, with nine new brotherhoods in just three years. In the period that began with the Democratic transition, more than half of the present brotherhoods were founded, notably during time of the developing Andalusian autonomy (1977–1982), which saw fifteen filiales. The cuatrienio (1984–1987) saw fourteen new brotherhoods.

Of the 107 brotherhoods existing in 2008 (including the Matriz de Almonte), 96 are Andalusian and 11 exist elsewhere, including Castilla-La Mancha, Ceuta, Extremadura and Murcia, along with those located in the historical regions of Andalusian emigration, such as Catalonia, Islas Baleares, Madrid and Valencia; additionally, of note is Brussels, the result of Andalusian migrants to Belgium.

In 2023, the number of brotherhoods rose to 127, the last one being the Hermandad de Montequinto and Torremolinos.

With regards to the number of pilgrims, the highest is Almonte (Huelva), with about 14,000 pilgrims in 2010–and an estimated 20,000 in 2023. Other noted pilgrimage sites include the sisterhood of Sanlúcar de Barrameda (with approximately 5,500 pilgrims), the Brotherhood of Emigrants of Huelva—founded initially in Germany by Huelva emigrants (with approx. 5,000 pilgrims)—, the Pilas (approx. 3,500), and Moguer (approx. 2,000). Smaller pilgrimages, of between 1,000–3,000 people, are seen in Bonares, Coria del Río, Gibraleón, Gines, Jerez de la Frontera, La Palma del Condado, Los Palacios, Rociana del Condado, San Juan del Puerto, Sevilla, Triana, Trigueros and Villamanrique de la Condesa. Smaller pilgrimages, either within Andalusia or elsewhere, may host less than 1,000 pilgrims, respectively.

== Non-affiliated brotherhoods and other groupings ==
There are nineteen non-affiliated brotherhoods constituted in public association and eight as private associations recognized by the sisterhood.

Although there are five Andalusians among them, the majority have emerged in the field of Andalusian emigration, especially in the main areas of destination of this migratory current Catalonia and Madrid.

There are also rociera groups without character of brotherhood recognized by the parent brotherhood, sixteen in Andalusia, nine in the rest of Spain and nine in other states of the world (of which five in Argentina and the other four distributed among Brazil, Puerto Rico, Bolivia and Australia) .

Among the international ones, some are related to Andalusian collectivities (like some of the Argentine).
