= Virgin of El Rocío =

A carved wooden statue

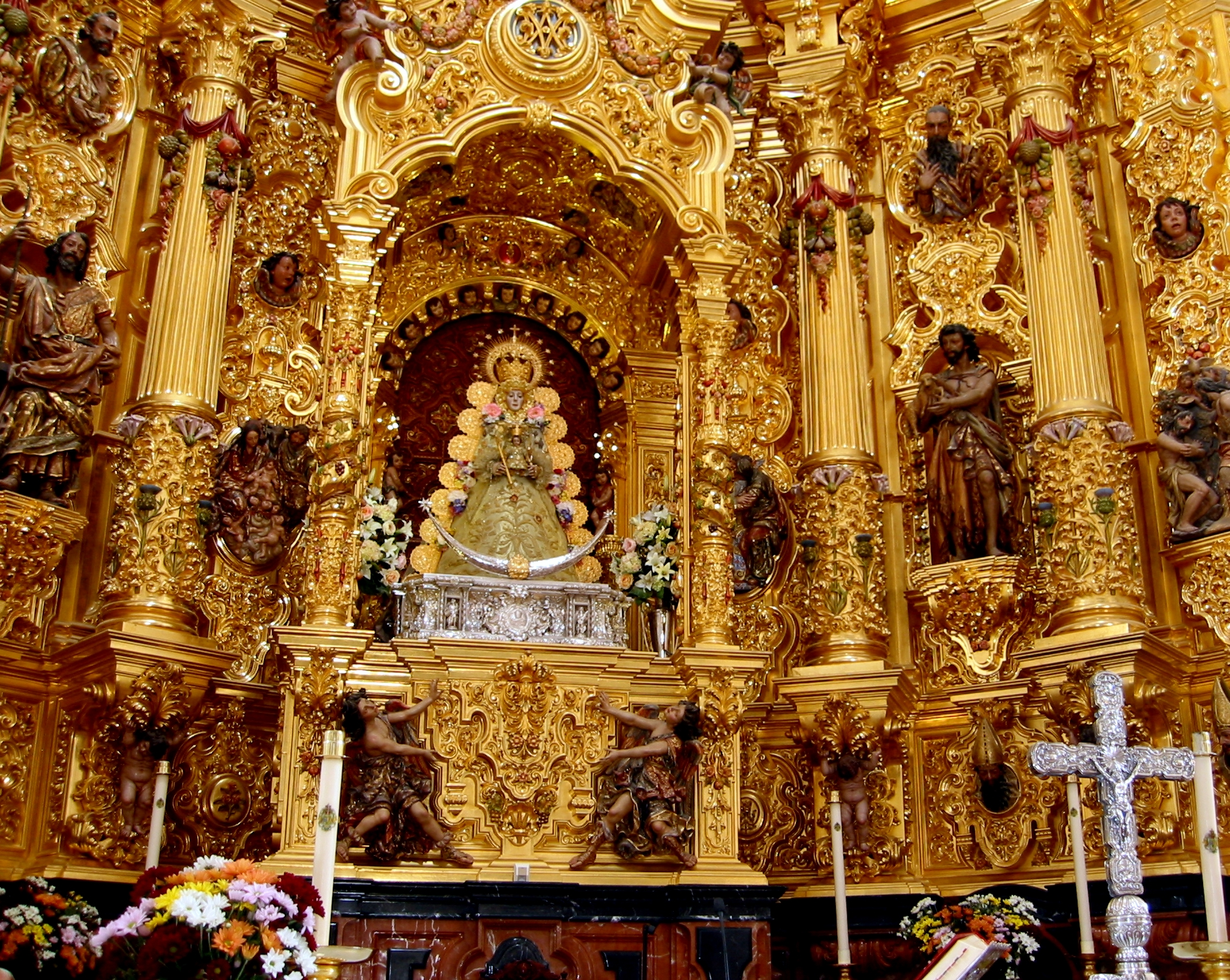
The Virgin of El Rocío.

The Virgin of El Rocío (also known as Madonna of El Rocío or Our Lady of El Rocío, Spanish: Virgen del Rocío, Nuestra Señora del Rocío; also, formerly, Nuestra Señora de los Remedios or Santa María de las Rocinas, Blanca Paloma or Reina de las Marismas) is a title of the Blessed Virgin Mary associated with a small carved wooden statue of the Virgin and Child, of which the only carved parts are the face, hands, and the Christ child, which is venerated at the Hermitage of El Rocío (Almonte, Province of Huelva, Spain). The associated annual procession/pilgrimage, known as the Romería de El Rocío, draws roughly a million people each year.

The Pilgrimage of the Rocío takes place in May or June, near Pentecost. In 1965, it was classified as a holiday of national touristic interest, while in 1980 it was renowned as a Holiday of international touristic interest. It has seen a great increase in popularity since the mid 20th century.

Although the present Hermitage of El Rocío dates only from the second half of the 20th century, there has been a hermitage on this site since the late 13th (or possibly early 14th) century. The statue of Our Lady of El Rocío certainly dates back to the first of these hermitages, though its precise date and origin are a matter of some controversy; the statue predates its garments.

The Virgin was declared the patron saint of Almonte 29 June 1653, and received Canonical Coronation in 1919. Pope John Paul II visited El Rocío and the Virgin 14 June 1993.

== Appearance ==
The original statue was roughly 1 metre (3.3 ft) high, although its garments and the superstructure that support them bring the total height to 156 centimetres (5.12 ft). It is a carved and painted wooden statue of the Virgin and Child, richly dressed in Baroque style. The eyes on the face look downward. According to Jesús Abades, it is made of birch wood. On the back of the sculpture is the legend "Nuestra Señora de los Remedios" ("Our Lady of Remedies"), believed to be the original name of the statue, before it became known in the 15th century as Santa María de las Rocinas (later del Rocío).

The statue is not realistic; rather, it is abstract and theological. Mary is represented specifically in her role as the mother of Jesus, her eyes looking down toward the child, contemplative.

=== Garments ===
The Virgin's garments do not date back as far as the statue itself. The tradition of dressing such devotional images dates largely from the late 16th and early 17th century. There is documentary evidence of garments for the Virgin as early as 1631, though those would not be the same garments as those used today; indeed some changes to the Virgin's garments can be specifically documented. For example, the present cloak dates only from 1952.

The clothes use rich fabrics and extensive brocading, but are of generally simple cut. On either side are flowers.

== Origin and modifications ==
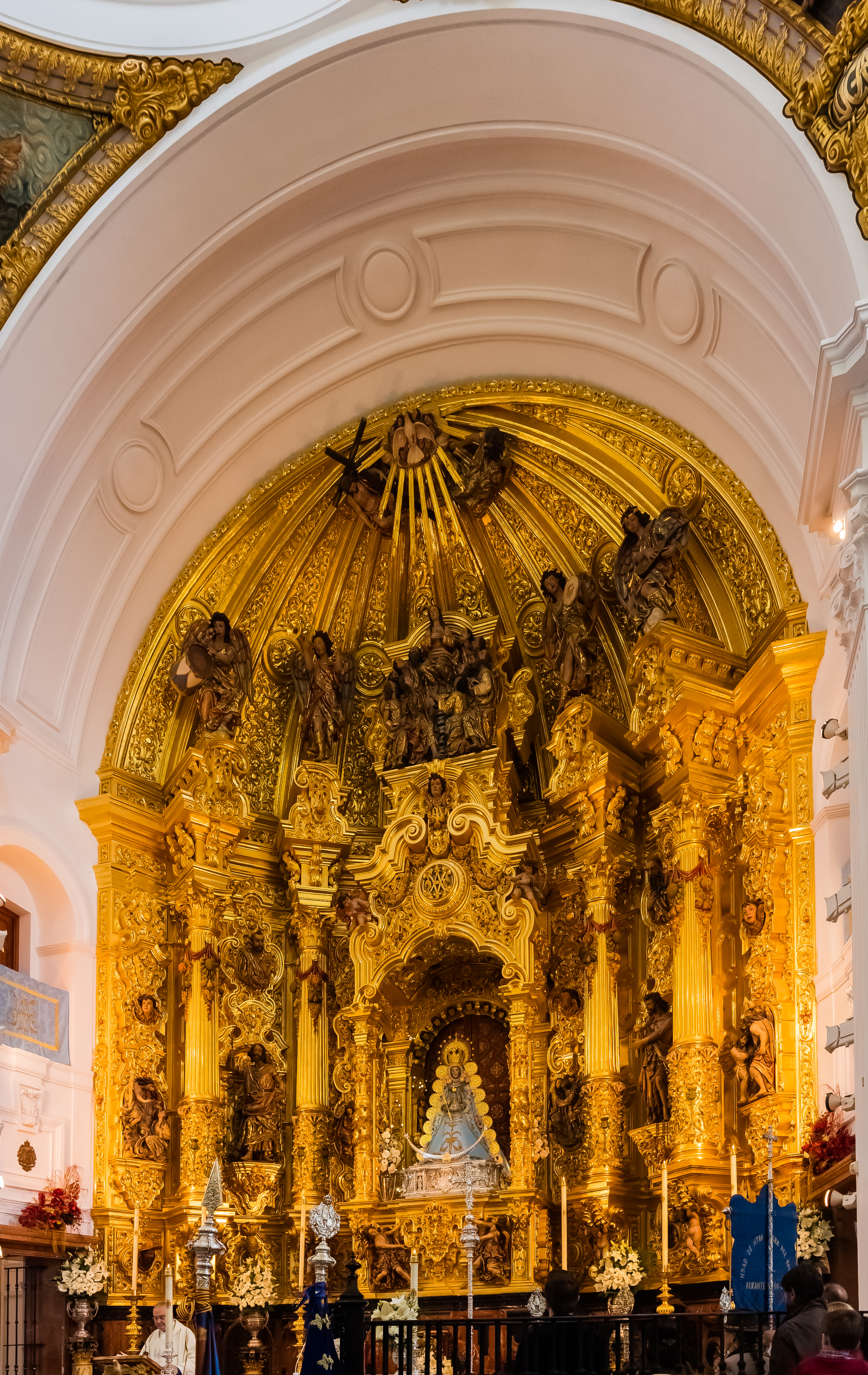
Altar of the Virgin of El Rocío.

Many scholars have expressed views on the date and authorship of the Virgin of El Rocío, but without reaching any clear consensus. José Alonso Morgado y Alonso, who gave the first rigorously scholarly description of the statue in 1882, believed it to be a 13th-century work, with important modifications in the early 15th century that gave it a Gothic aspect. According to Morgado, it was further modified in the 17th century when it was richly garbed in the Baroque style of the era. José María Vázquez Soto, writing in 1997, essentially endorsed this view, although he believes that the clothes date from the 18th century, based on their style. Sevillian historian Jesús López Alfonso also believes that the figure dated from the second half of the 13th century. Juan Infante-Galán Zambrano related the statue to a Saint Anne venerated in a church in Triana, which would also match this date.

The painter Santiago Martínez, writing in 1949, believed that the face was the original, and that the original work is generally well preserved from the waist down. However, according to Martínez, other than the face, the upper half was significantly altered to add the clothing and the figure of the Christ child.

Historians Juan Miguel González Gómez and Manuel Jesús Carrasco Terriza, both from Huelva and the latter the designer of the current altarpiece of the Hermitage, date the original statue between 1280 and 1335. According to González and Carrasco, the statue is of French origin. They further write that the custom of dressing the statue (though possibly not in its present garb) must date back at least to 1605, based on a drawing from that date; they date this custom from the late 16th or very early 17th century. Further, they date the hands, the Christ child, and the downcast eyes of the Virgin from roughly the same time as the clothes.

Several recent scholars have pointed to strong stylistic resemblances to the work of Jorge Fernández Alemán (late 15th and early 16th century) or of the Flemish sculptor Roque Balduque (mid-16th century).

Jesús Abades largely endorses the views of González and Carrasco. In his view, the Virgin of El Rocío is originally French or Central European. He agrees that it is "mutilated" from the waist up (with a framework for its garments replacing parts of the original). Following José María Fernández, he dates the subsidiary figure of the Christ child to the 18th century. He considers it likely that the statue underwent significant restoration in the early 16th century, which would be consistent with the theory of involvement by Fernández Alemán.
