= Santa Olalla del Cala =

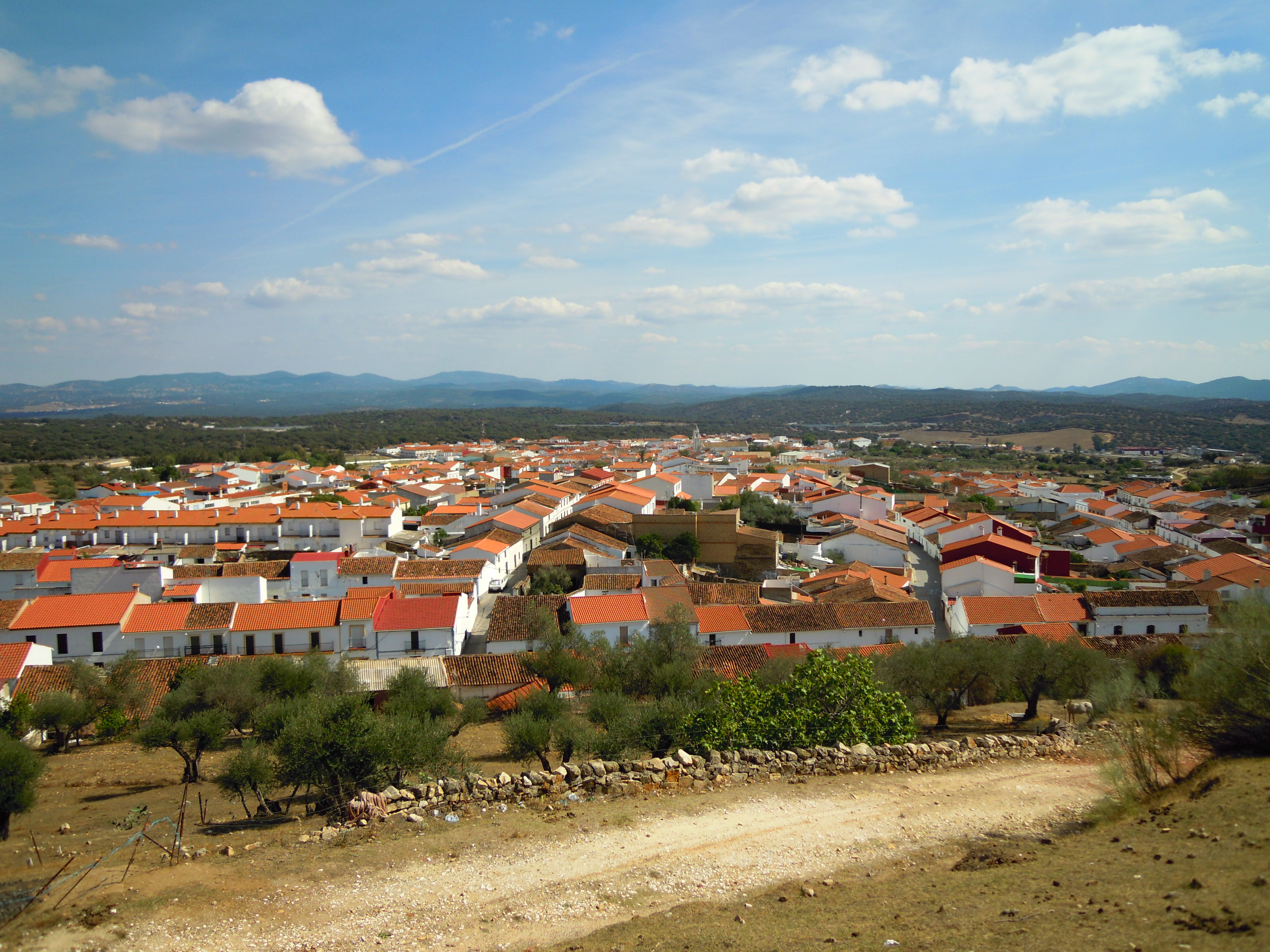
- Santa Olalla del Cala

- Flag Coat of arms

- Location in Spain
- Coordinates: 37°54′N 6°13′W
- Country: Spain
- Autonomous community: Andalusia
- Province: Huelva
- Comarca: Sierra de Huelva

Government
  - Mayor: Antonio Plaza Barrero

Area
  - Total: 204 km^{2} (79 sq mi)
  - Land: 204 km^{2} (79 sq mi)
  - Water: 0.00 km^{2} (0 sq mi)
- Elevation: 535 m (1,755 ft)

Population (2025-01-01)
  - Total: 2,039
  - Density: 10.0/km^{2} (25.9/sq mi)
- Time zone: UTC+1 (CET)
  - Summer (DST): UTC+2 (CEST)
- Website: www.santa-olalla-del-cala.es

Santa Olalla del Cala is a large village within the Autonomous region of Andalucia in southern Spain. The village is also a municipality located in the province of Huelva. the village is situated 1.1 miles (1.8 km) west of the A66-E803 motorway which runs from Sevilla to Salamanca. The village is 43.7 miles (70.3 km) north of the city of Sevilla and 40.9 miles (65.8 km) south of the town of Zafra. The village is 447.5 kilometres (278.1 mi) from the Spanish capital of Madrid and takes approximately 6 hours to travel from there by taxi. The nearest airport is Sevilla Airport which is 52.0 miles (83.7 km) to the south of the village. The nearest railway station is at Llerena which is 34.6 miles (55.7 km) north east of the village.

== Location ==
The village is situated in the southern slopes of the foothills of the Sierra Morena mountain range close to the border between the regions of Andalusia and Extremadura. The municipality is in the northeast of the Province of Huelva, and is within the Aracena Natural Park, which is a protected areas of the Community and occupies the entire north of the province. The village sits on the eastern slope of a proment hill which is topped with a castle fortress, a parish church which in the past has been a Jewish synagogue and a Moorish Mosque. The surrounding countryside consists of meadows and small hills covered predominantly forest of oaks, chestnut trees and scrubland, through which numerous small streams flow.

== Local economy ==
The municipality's main economic activity is agriculture, especially olive groves and Holm Oak foraging groves. The village is also produces cork and wood crafting works as well as embroidery and crochet needle crafts. Other working activities in the village also include wholesale and retail trading, houses building, activities related to the sale and repair of private and agricultural vehicles and motorbikes. The local gastronomy incorporates a large range of products derived from the Iberian pig.

== The castle ==
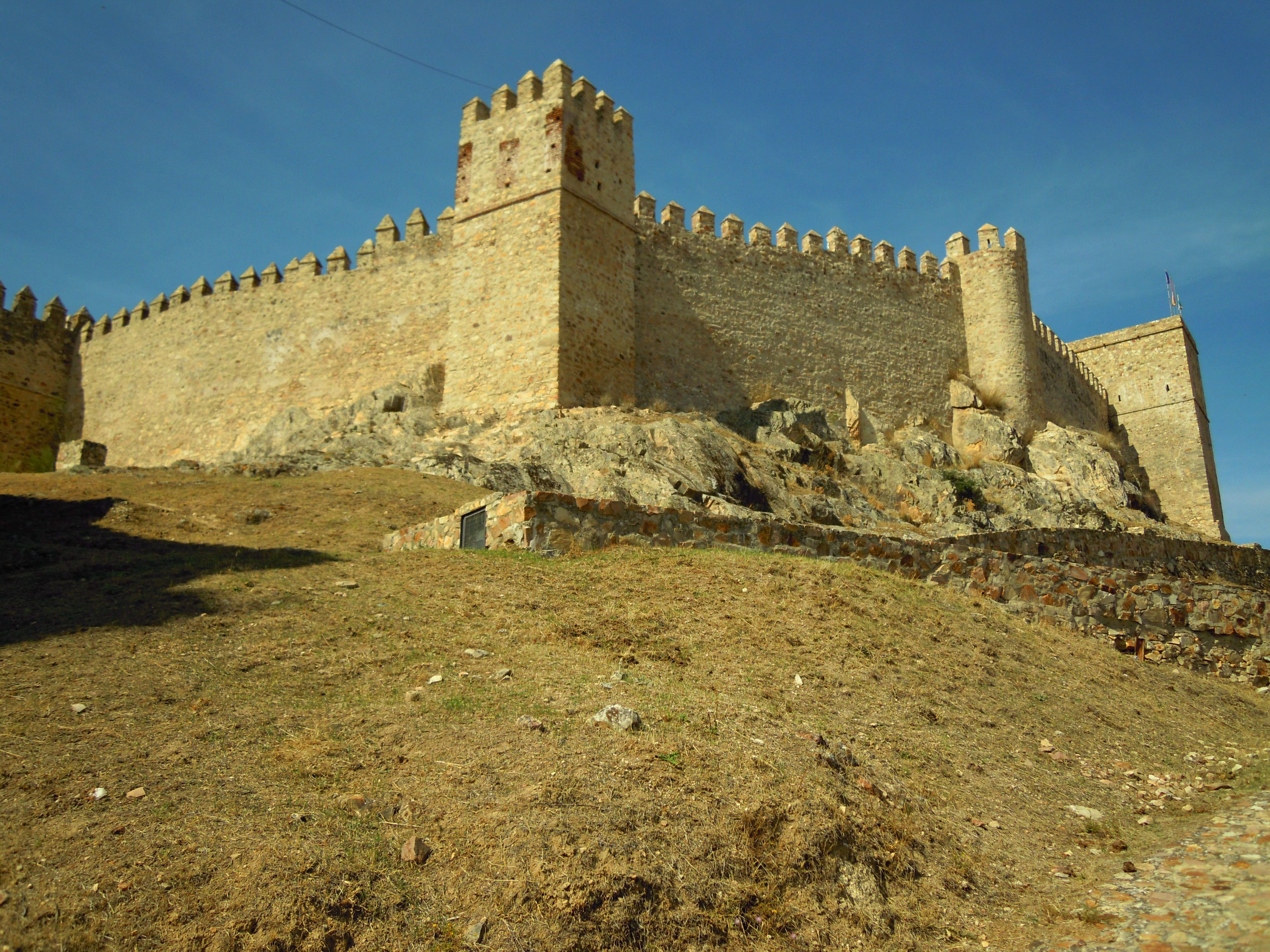
The west elevation of the castle

The castle stands on a prominent rocky ridge above the village. The fortress, although the ramparts are reminiscent of Moorish castles, was built by the Christian king of Castile, Sancho IV in the thirteenth century replacing a much smaller fortress which had been built earlier by the Muslim rulers of Andalucía. The Muslim structure is thought to have been built on top a much early Roman fortification. The castle was part of a defence system built to protect the city of Seville from the Portuguese. This defence system was called the Banda Gallega or The Galician Band. The system composed of three lines of defence, which mostly utilized older Moorish fortresses. The first line contained the castles of Aroche, Encinasola and Fregenal de la Sierra. In the second line was the Torre of San Bartolomé and Cortegana castle. The third line included Santa Olalla del Cala and the fortress at Aracena.

=== Construction ===
The castle is constructed from stone masonry and brickwork. The curtain walls have ten towers in total. Four of the towers are circular and the other six are rectangular in shape. The towers are constructed of solid stone and rise to the height of the parapet at which there is a vaulted chamber. This is topped by battlements of which some have pyramidal and brick cube castellation. The inner precinct is of an irregular coffin shape and follows the plan of the ridge top of the hill. On the North West elevation there is an entrance tower which is turned 90° to the main curtain wall of the fortress.

=== Later years ===
Following the castle’s decline as a fortress other uses were found for the stronghold. In the 19th century and into the 20th century the castle precinct and curtain walls were used as the municipal cemetery. The walls were pierced to form burial niches, considerably weakening the castle's structure. In 1949 the castle was declared a site of cultural interest and measures were taken to preserve the site.

== Iglesia de Nuestra Senora de la Asuncion ==
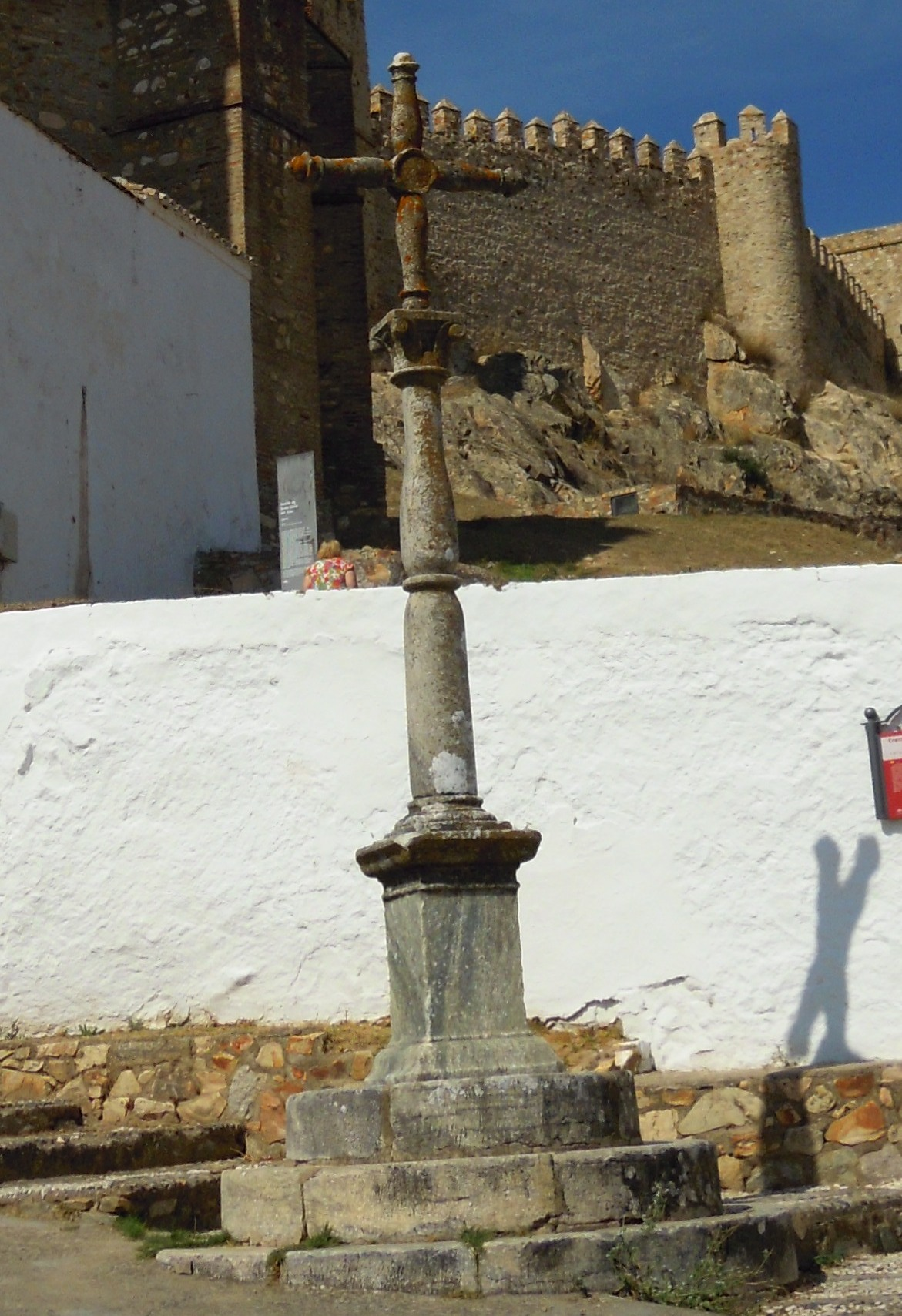
The Plateresco style Cross on the 'Silver Way'

The church of Nuestra Senora de la Asuncion stands at the southern end of the rocky hill where the castle is situated. It was built in the 9th century and has since then been used for a range of purposes: in the 10th century it was a synagogue and was the Jewish quarter of the village. Two columns from that period remain visible inside the church. During the Muslim occupation the building became a mosque. The Apse still retains it Mudejar style with its brick arches and vaults. Two features of the Christian church include an example of a Gothic doorway, and a statue of the Virgin de los Dolores carved by the Spanish Baroque sculptor Juan de Mesa y Velasco of Seville. A preserved ship's anchor is also contained, kept to commemorate the time when Santa Olalla was the base to a Maritime infantry regiment during the Napoleonic Wars.

=== Pilgrimage Cross ===
Opposite the doorway to the Iglesia de Nuestra Senora de la Asuncion, and a little down the hill, stands a 16th-century Plateresco style cross erected to mark the way of Pilgrimage known as the 'Silver Way' or Vía de la Plata to Santiago de Compostela from the Andulucian city of Seville. The marker consists of a baluster column topped by a Genovese capital. Above the capital sits a Plateresque flint cross.

== Demographics ==
Historical population
Year	Pop.	±%
1999	2,297	—
2000	2,244	−2.3%
2001	2,203	−1.8%
2002	2,192	−0.5%
2003	2,173	−0.9%
2004	2,176	+0.1%
2005	2,143	−1.5%
Source: INE (Spain)

== See also ==
- List of municipalities in Huelva

== Gallery ==
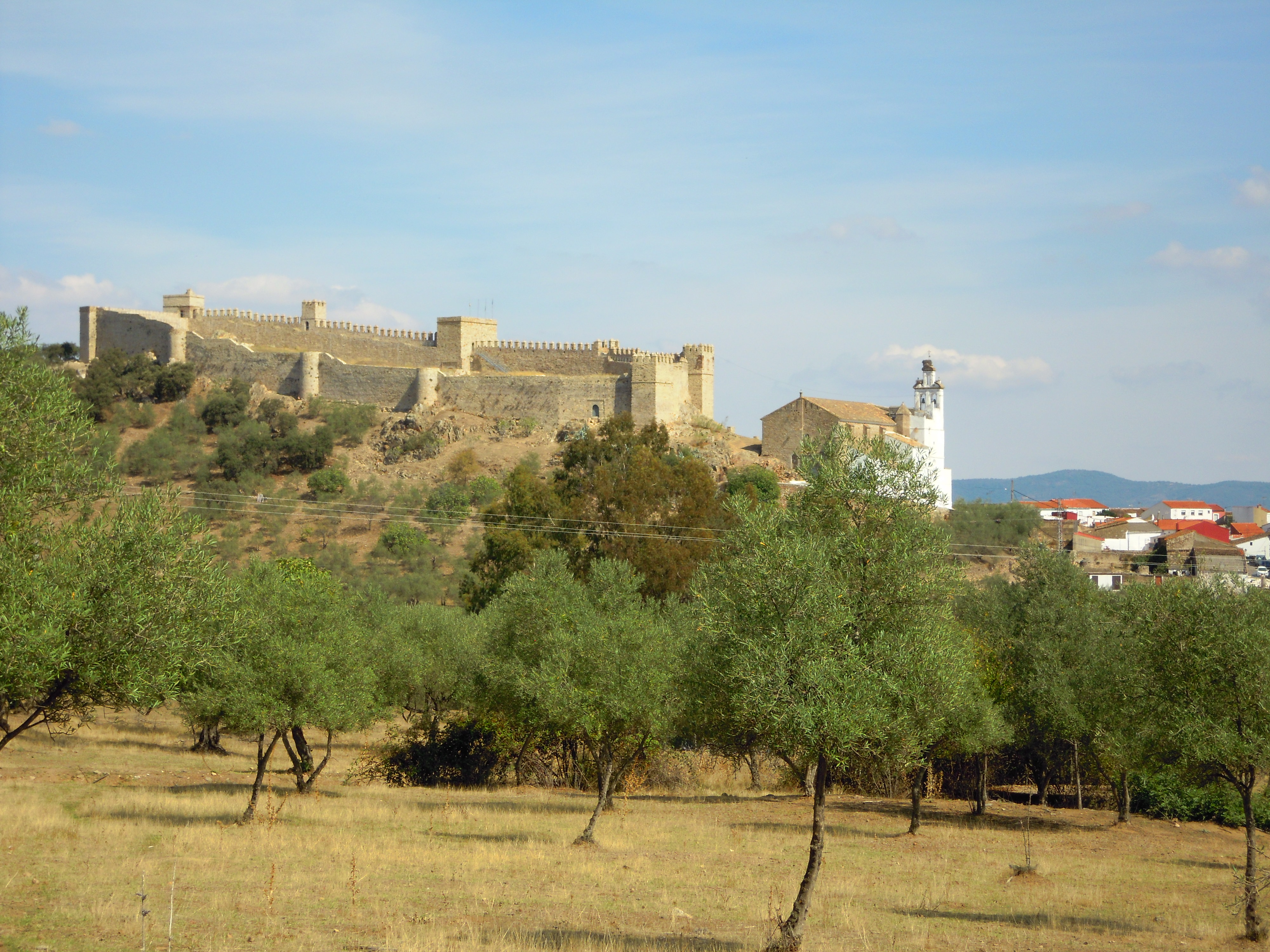
The castle viewed from the east

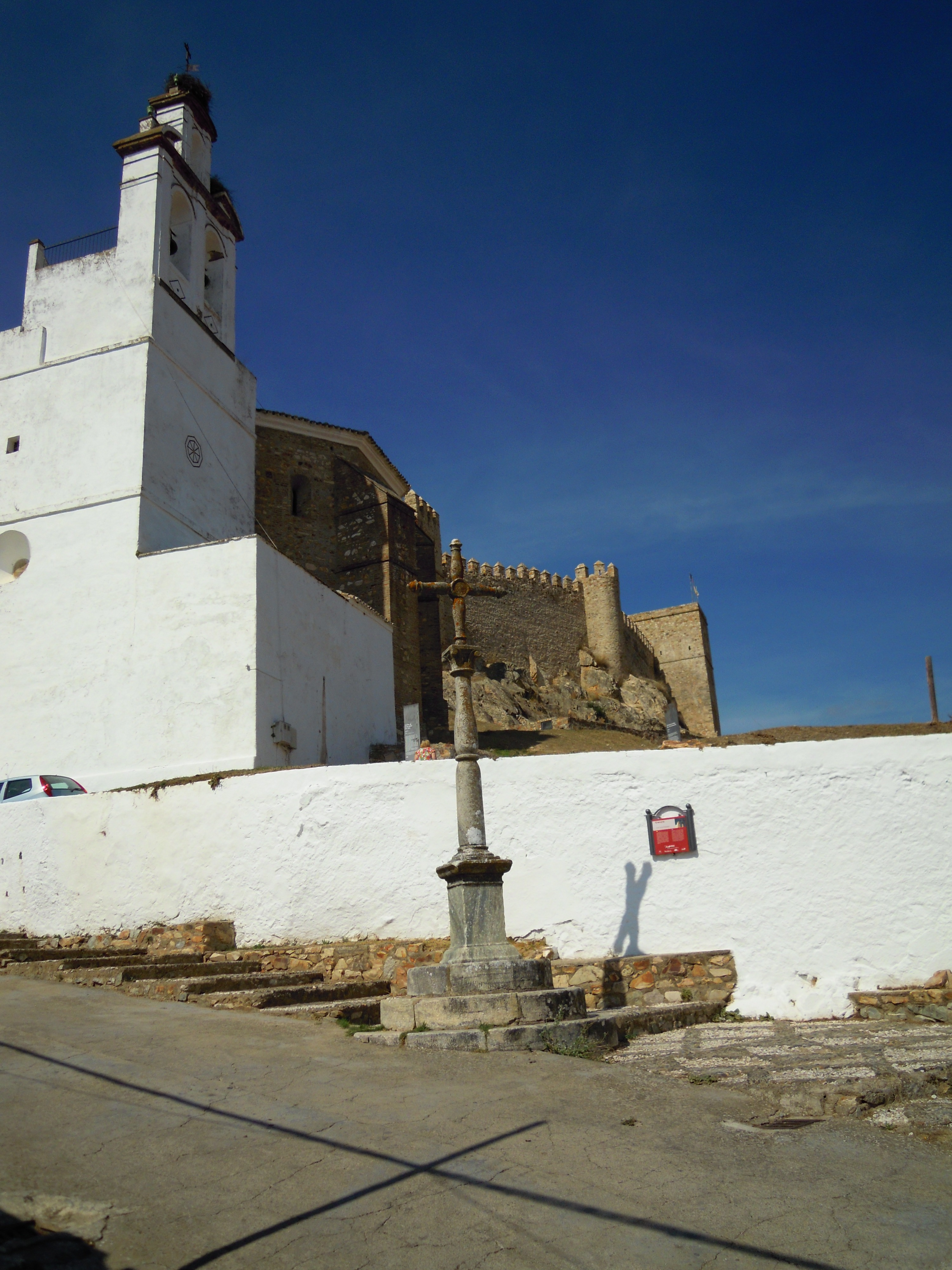
The Church de Nuestra Senora de la Asuncion in the village of Santa Olalla del Cala

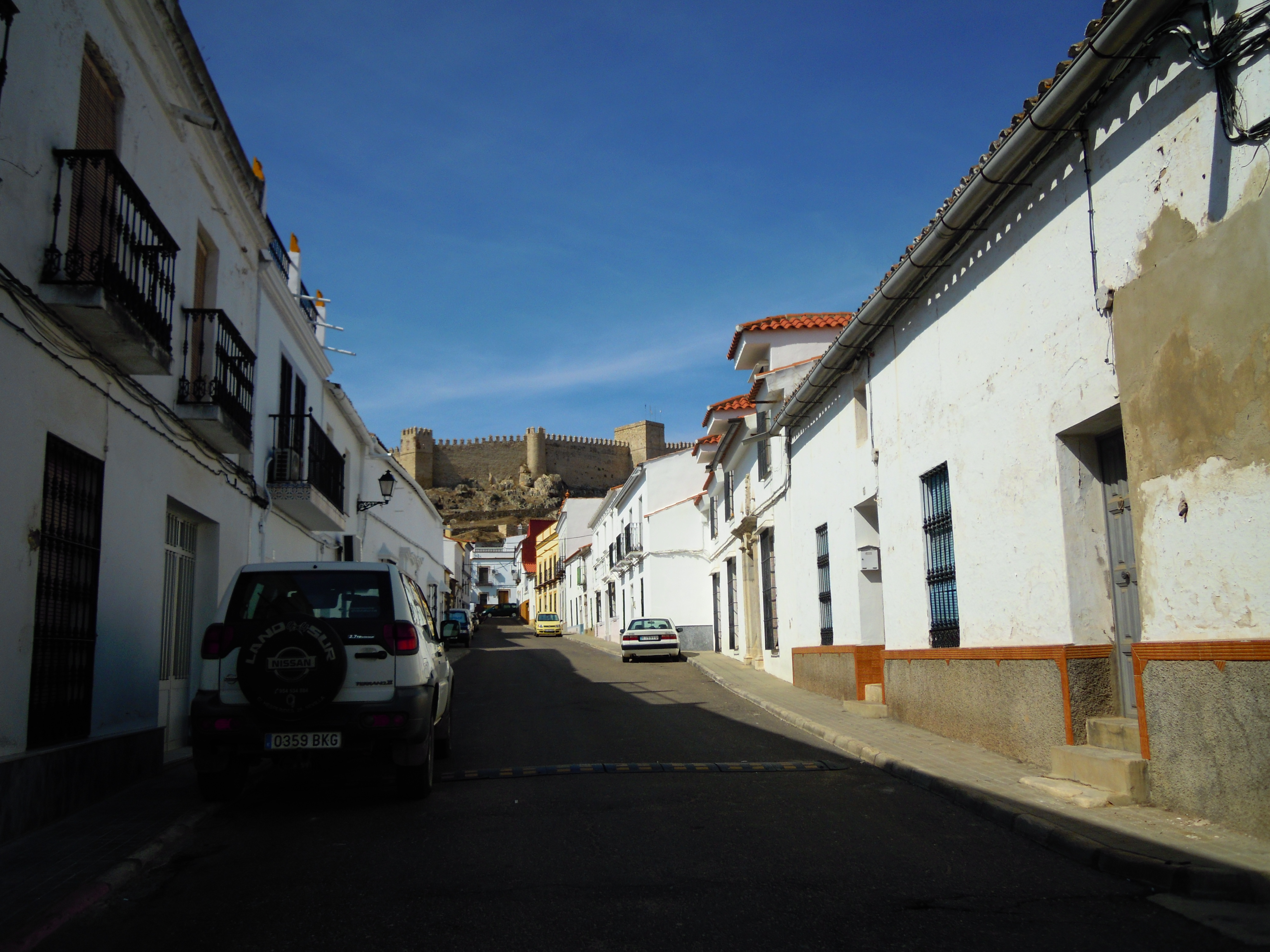
Street leading up to the castle in the village of Santa Olalla del Cala

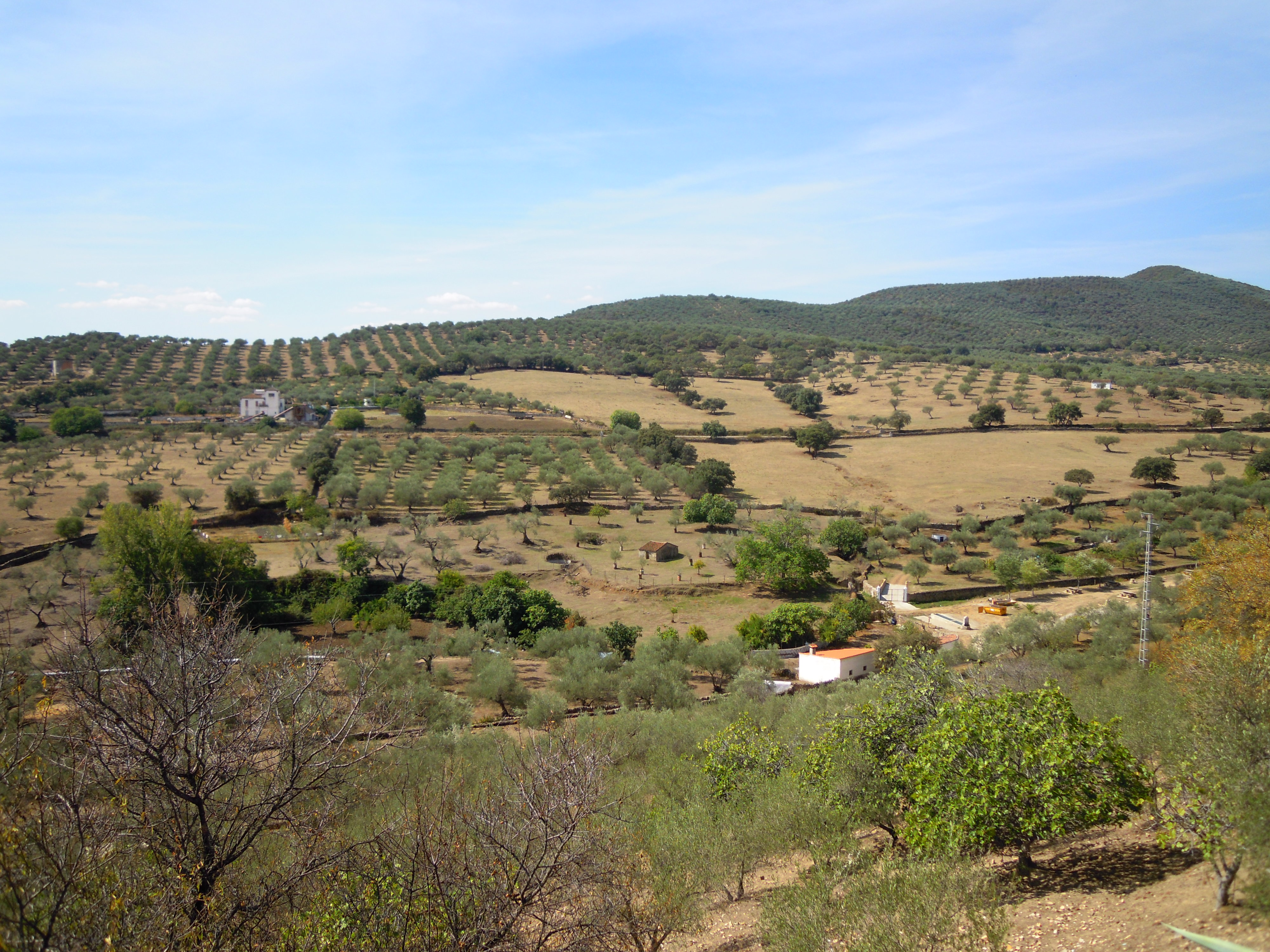
View of surrounding countryside to the west of the castle
