= Mauricio González-Gordon y Díez =

Spanish sherry maker and conservationist

- Born: 18 October 1923; Hampton Hill, London, United Kingdom
- Died: 27 September 2013 (aged 89); Jerez de la Frontera, Spain
- Education: University of Seville
- Known for: preservation efforts of Doñana National Park, sherry business
- Title: Marquis of Bonanza (1980–2013)
- Spouse: Milagro López de Carrizosa y Eizaguirre
- Children: 2

Mauricio González-Gordon y Díez, Marquis of Bonanza (18 October 1923 – 27 September 2013) was a Spanish sherry maker and a conservationist. Most of his life he worked for the family company, González Byass, where he increased its exports to a worldwide level. His family estate was located in the wetland region called Doñana in southern Spain and was threatened by drainage efforts in the early 1950s. González-Gordon with the help of researchers and international support managed to preserve the site, while at the same time donating some of his family land to the conservation effort. Afterward, González-Gordon became one of the founders of the Spanish Ornithological Society in 1954. His conservation efforts for Doñana culminated in the creation of the Doñana National Park in 1969. The area was designated a UNESCO World Heritage Site in 1994.

== Early years ==
González-Gordon was born on 18 October 1923 in Hampton Hill, London, United Kingdom, as a son to a Spanish family with Scottish descent rooted in the Clan Gordon. His parents were Manuel María González-Gordon and Emilia Díez Gutiérrez. Mauricio, whose father was known as the 'Pope of Sherry', was the second of a total of four children. One of his ancestors, John David Gordon of Wardhouse, had moved to Jerez de la Frontera in the 18th century and started trading in sherry. At the time of his birth, González-Gordon's father Manuel was the chairman of González Byass and was actively promoting the brand in the United Kingdom. During his youth González-Gordon was raised as a bilingual, being fluent in both Spanish and English. González-Gordon moved to Jerez de la Frontera at age three to go to school in Spain. He was homeschooled by private tutors and attended La Salle Buen Pastor college. He later attended the Instituto Padre Luis Coloma. His primary studies were followed up by economic studies at the Jerez College of Commerce, where he licensed as a teacher of trade. He passed the final period of the Spanish Civil War in 1939 working in an airplane factory, helping construct Polikarpov planes for the aerial forces of General Francisco Franco. He attended the University of Seville and graduated in Chemical Sciences in 1946.

== González Byass ==
González-Gordon worked most of his life for the family company González Byass, which specialises in making sherry. He was the fifth generation of the family to chair the company. While working for the firm he was involved in the making, tasting and commercialisation of sherry and in later years he also helped the company expand into producing brandy and several sorts of wine. Immediately after he finished his studies in 1946 he joined the business and started at the bottom with the picking and crushing of grapes. During this time he also learned about the solera system, which is used to age different type of liquids. His interest in oenology had only developed after visiting California the year he graduated. He visited California after previously being sent to New York by boat with twelve containers of wine. In 1955 he founded the first research center for viticulture and winemaking in Spain by establishing one at González Byass. For twenty years he was occupied as head of wine selection at the company. González-Gordon also served on the board of González Byass beginning in 1961, and was president of the company between 1993 and 1999. During this period González-Gordon managed to expand the business by exporting all over the world, including to the United States, United Kingdom, China and East Asia. After his time as president he continued to serve as an advisor to his son, Mauricio Junior, who took over his position. Apart from his work at González Byass González-Gordon also diverted some of his time towards the regulatory council of the sherry making industry, serving for 24 years.

== Conservationism ==
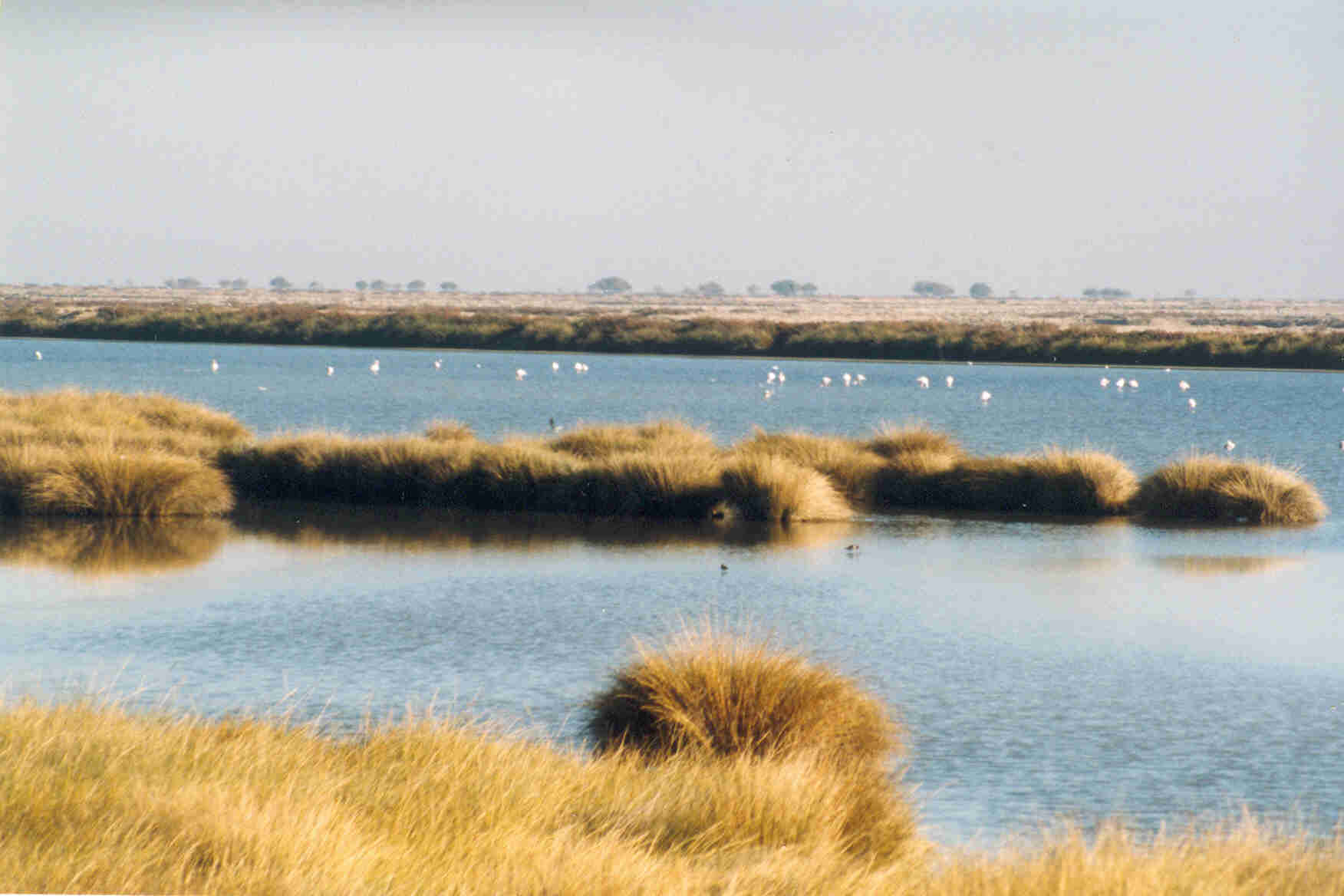
Wetlands in Doñana

González-Gordon was involved with conservationism from an early age; he was also an avid bird watcher and would become an ornithologist. His family estate was located in the Coto Doñana, a wetland at the mouth of the river Guadalquivir, near Jerez de la Frontera, in southern Spain. Here González-Gordon became interested in the local ecosystem and invited European ornithologists to visit the area. When two Spanish ornithologists, Professor Francisco Bernis and José Antonio Valverde visited, González-Gordon served as their guide. The González-Gordon family saw that the wetlands were threatened by the planting of eucalyptus trees and large-scale drainage plans proposed by the government. Mauricio, together with his father, asked Bernis to try and influence Spanish dictator Francisco Franco into abandoning these proposals. The trio wrote a memorandum which was presented to Franco himself by Mauricio's father Manuel. By November 1953, Bernis had finished a report on the value of the Doñana, which showed that the area had exceptional ecological value. The group sought international support for their goals and found it. The efforts of González-Gordon to dissuade Franco exposed him to some danger, but the Franco government conceded and the drainage plans were aborted.

By 1963 an international organisation founded with the goal of protecting Doñana had purchased 7,000 hectares (17,000 acres) in the area. After winning their fight against the construction plans González-Gordon, Bernis and Valverde wished to create a Spanish foundation for ornithology. The idea to start the organisation had already come up in their first meeting. In May 1954 they founded the Spanish Ornithological Society (SEO) in Madrid, which currently is the Spanish affiliate of BirdLife International. The trio had written the founding statutes among themselves. The organisation was supported by visits to Doñana of famous ornithologists as Edward Max Nicholson and Julian Huxley, with González-Gordon guiding them around. He would also serve as chair of the board of SEO between 1966 and 1968. The Doñana area was turned into Doñana National Park in 1969. The González-Gordon family ceded much of its land between Bonanza and Matalascañas for the creation of the national park. In 1994 the area was turned into an UNESCO World Heritage Site and currently measures 543 square kilometres (210 sq mi). The park has a wide range of ecosystems and is especially important for migratory birds. González-Gordon also wrote a translation of Roger Tory Peterson's A Field Guide to the Birds of Britain and Europe in 1957.

== Personal life ==
González-Gordon has been described as being proud of his Scottish heritage, which centred on the town of Huntly and the Clan Gordon. His personal clothing style reflected this; he was noted for his tweed jackets and British clothes in general. He had been married to Milagro López de Carrizosa y Eizaguirre for 62 years before she died in July 2013. The couple had two children, Bibiana and Mauricio, with Mauricio being the current president of the family company. During the three final years of his life González-Gordon was in poor health and could hardly leave his home. He died on 27 September 2013 in his hometown of Jerez de la Frontera at the age of 89. His family claims that the last thing he drank was a Tío Pepe, the most famous brand of the family business. His death occurred at the Asisa clinic where he had spent his last couple of weeks. The memorial service was held at the San Juan Bautista de La Salle church on 28 September.

Apart from his work at González Byass and his conservation efforts at Doñana he was also president of the local Red Cross organisation in Jerez de la Frontera, serving as its president for thirteen years, between 1974 and 1988.

== Honours and decorations ==
Mauricio González-Gordon y Díez was Marquis of Bonanza, obtaining the title after the death of his father in 1980. During the course of his life he received several honours and decorations:

- Cross of Naval Merit with White Decoration awarded by the King of Spain for his dedication to sailing.
- Knight of the Order of the Dannebrog awarded by the Queen of Denmark (1985).
- Member of the Gran Orden de Caballeros del Vino awarded by the British embassy in Spain.
- Golden medal awarded by the Red Cross (1986).
- Golden medal of Oenologic Merit and Grand Cross of Agricultural Merit by Miguel Arias Cañete, Spanish Minister for Agriculture, Food and Environment (2011).

In 2004 he received the Bernis Award for Ornithology from the Spanish Ornithological Society/BirdLife for his pioneering work and lifetime contribution to conservation, especially of Doñana. He was awarded the Premio Andalucía de Medio Ambiente, the Andalusian Prize of Environment, by the government of Andalusia in 2005. In 2009 he was made hijo predilecto, favourite son, of the municipality of Jerez de la Frontera.
