= Matalascañas =

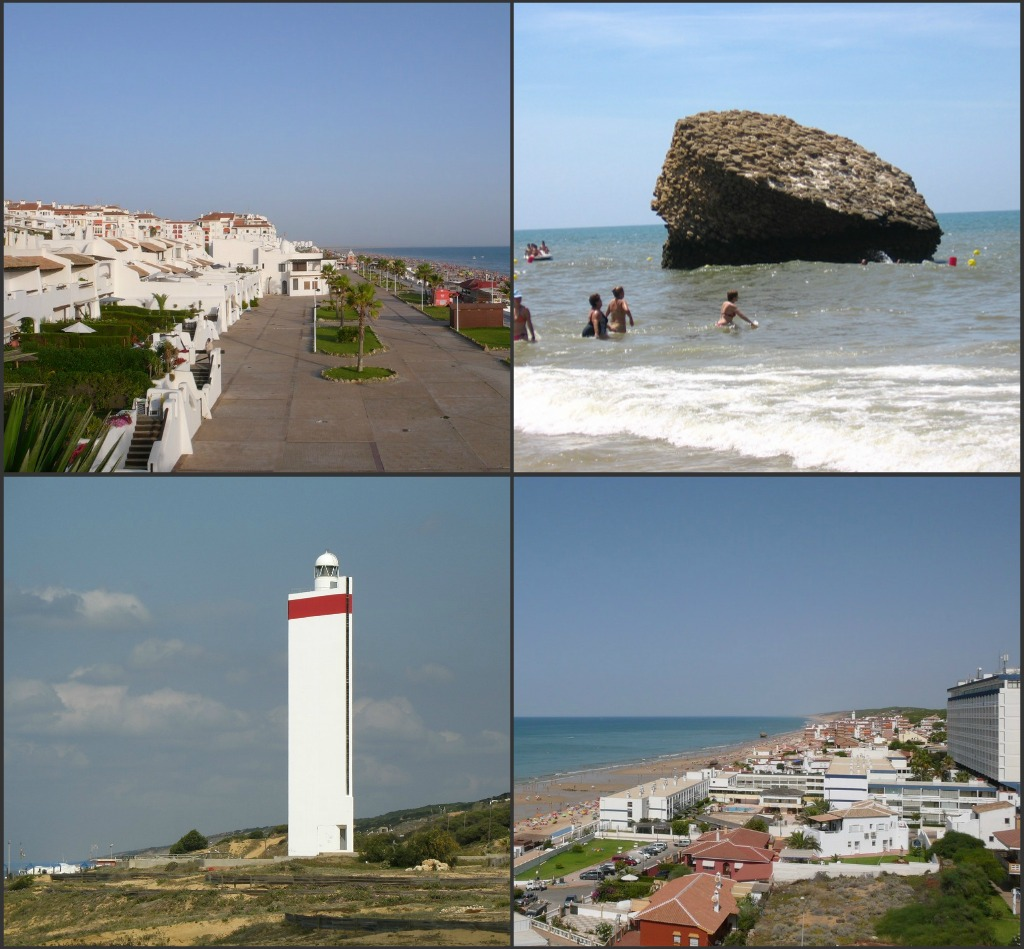
- Top left:Gulf of Cadiz and Matalascañas Beach, view from Nutria area, Top right:Rock of Higuera (Torre de la Higuera), Bottom left:Matalascañas Lighthouse, Bottom right:View of Palmito area in Matalascañas Beach

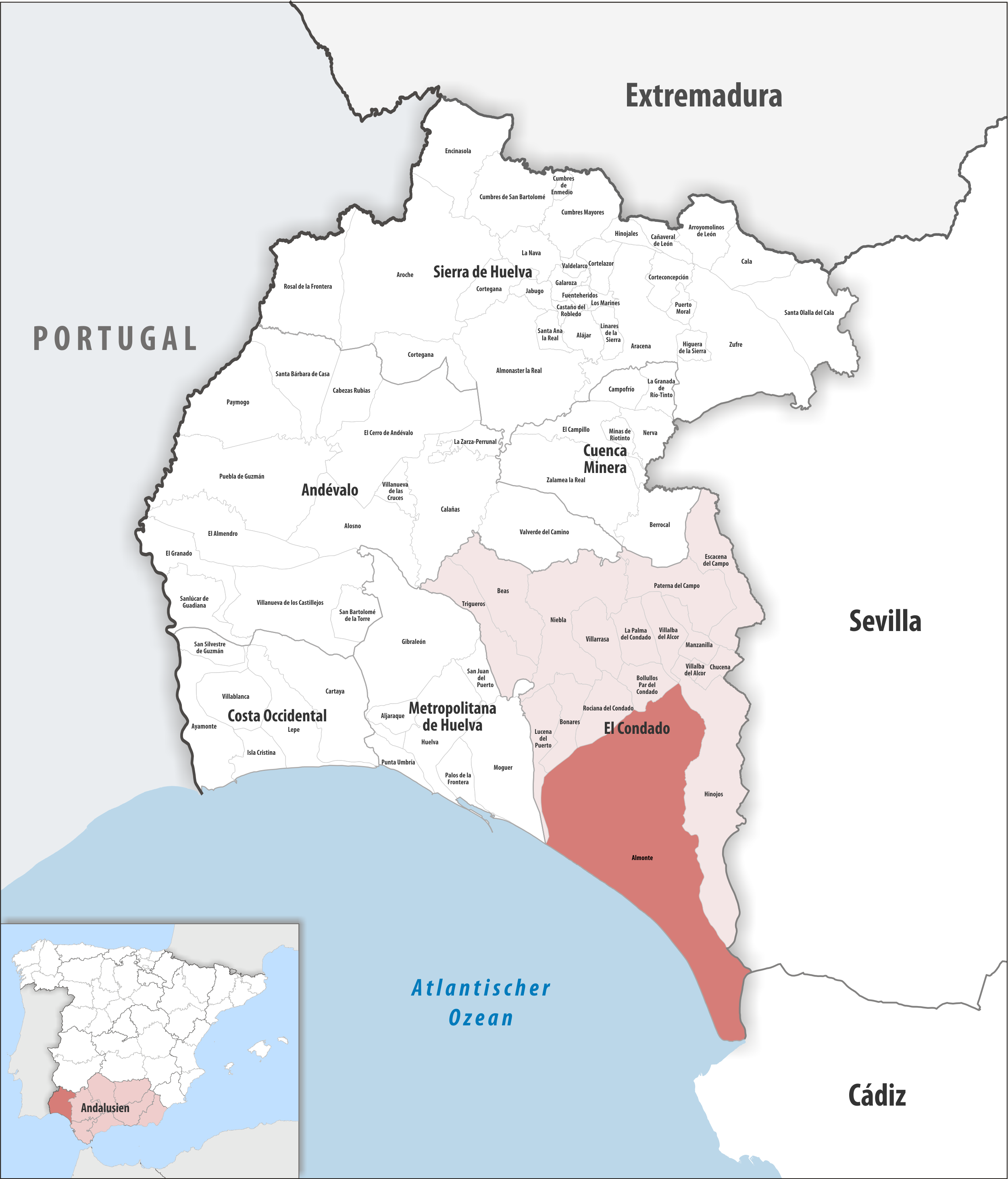
- Municipality of Almonte

- Location in Andalusia
- Coordinates: 36°59′36″N 06°32′36″W
- Country: Spain
- Autonomous community: Andalusia
- Province: Huelva
- Comarca: Condado
- Municipality: Almonte
- Elevation: 20 m (66 ft)

Population (2023)
  - Total: 2,886
- Demonym(s): Almonteño/a, Torrehiguerense.
- Time zone: UTC+1 (CET)
  - Summer (DST): UTC+2 (CEST)
- Postal code: 21760
- Dialing code: 959

Matalascañas (Spanish pronunciation: [matalas'kaɲas]; local dialect: [matalaʰ'kaɲa]) is the name of an Atlantic beach and coastal resort town within the Municipality of Almonte, in southwestern Spain. It is known for having an ancient upside down tower on the sand called Torre de la Higuera, one of the seven defensive towers built by Phillip II in the 16th century to protect the coast from incursions by Turkish and North African corsairs and which is protected as a Cultural Interest Asset by the government. This beach is part of the coast of Almonte, which is the longest beach in Spain, being around 30 miles long (53 km) and including several other landmarks like Torre del Loro's Beach, Cuesta Maneli Beach and the virgin beaches of the Doñana National Park, ending at river Guadalquivir. This locale was still called by the tower's name until the 1970s. Matalascañas is surrounded by the Doñana National Park and was segregated from it in 1969 to allow the development of a beach-side tourist village. The mild Mediterranean climate, fine golden sand of the beachfront, mobile dunes and clean water attract tourists throughout the year and the summer nightlife is attractive to young people. Officially established in 1972, its population goes into orbit during the summer, due to its proximity to Seville and being a holiday destination for neighbouring towns and a final residence for retired people. It has been holding the title of Blue flag beach for decades.

== History ==
Almonte purchased the eastern Atlantic coast of Huelva in 1583, several centuries before the Doñana National Park was established. Local farming and fishing business then started in the area. In 1924, German archaeologist Adolf Schulten visited the area in his quest to find Atlantis and, despite finally giving up, he came across several Roman ruins, including a garum factory from the 3rd century AD. It is evidence of the fishing industry in the area back then. During the 40s, eucalyptus were planted as part of the wood and paper industry plan and many river courses were altered. The 2nd Marquis of Bonanza sold a great part of this area to businessman Salvador Noguera and to the 3rd Marquis of Mérito. By 1962, they had founded the company Coto de Doñana, S.A., which sold a 7-kilometer long strip of coast (4.35 miles) to company Hirta, S.A., both involved in the winegrowing industry of Jerez de la Frontera.

By the mid 60s, several fishing huts had been installed along the coast, nearby the ruins of the tower, most of them made of bulrush, a traditional material in the area Road A-483 was finished by 1965 and would become later a turn-off of the popular motorway A-49 to connect Almonte to Huelva and Seville. In 1966 a new project to urbanise the coast, which was declared National Touristic Centre two years later. The National Park was established in 1969, delimiting the area available for the future resort.

The first brick was laid that same year and El Delfín (The Dolphin) was the first luxury building in the area, with private investment from estate agency Costa de la Luz and company Playas del Coto de Doñana, S.A.. A year later the first parish, the Flamero hotel and La Prensa, another residential building, were opened. In a few years, private investment skyrocketed beyond €9 million (a quantity unheard of at the time). Phone wires between Almonte and the new coastal resort were installed and the works on highway A-49 were speeded up to connect to local road A-483 and establish a faster way from Seville.

By the summer of 1971, Matalascañas had already become a national touristic destination, holding music festivals and all kind of contests (photography, literature, beauty, sailing and fishing) soon became usual, even attracting celebrities and socialites, including the royal family. Both its unique climate and its status as a resort embedded within Europe's greatest natural reserve, soon made international tourism turn up and Hollywood took notice of the unique landscapes to start shooting several films, like The Wind and the Lion

Two years later, an average of 180,000 tourists were visiting Matalascañas in the summer, many of them affluent foreigners and socialites, with charter flights and horse carriages becoming a matter of course in those days. That same year the first fishing club opened, later becoming the Nautical and Fishing Club of Matalascañas and international stars such as Julio Iglesias performed in town. This glamorous exclusivity and unrestrained joy would soon come to an end when the council of Almonte, along with the regional and national government pushed legislation to take over the urban impact on the national park in 1988.

In 1990, the works for the biggest hotel in Almonte began, an imposing L-shaped building called Gran Hotel El Coto, just at the very end of the urban area, limiting with the national park. In 1993 Matalascañas was awarded its first Blue Flag, in recognition of its quality and eco-friendly services. In 1998, the works for the first green golf course in Europe began, finishing two years later. With 18 holes and 290,000m^{2}, the golf course opened in year 2000 and caused great expectations.

In 2002, around 130 hectares of the coast east from the urban area were protected under a special status, becoming the Parque Dunar (Dune park). Its name refers to the high fossil dunes formed all along the coast of Almonte and far beyond the ruins of the Torre del Oro (Gold River Tower). A 100-meter high dune cliff can be found at El Asperillo, being the highest dune cliff in Europe, declared a Natural Monument of Andalusia. With an investment of more than €20 million, the Parque Dunar became a walkable attraction in which several important landmarks were installed, such as the sea museum Museo del Mundo Marino, a research centre, a horse riding club, a camel riding club, a beach restaurant, a nautical club, a lighthouse and several other buildings.

In 2021, several tracks belonging to extinct ungulate animals and neanderthal humans were found on the clay substratum that got uncovered during the low tide at the shore. They date back from 100,000 BC. The environmental association from the Parque Dunar organises free guided tours that include historical and geological commentaries and a voluntary litter collection. A recent research published by Quaternary Science Reviews and carried out by the University of Huelva confirmed that the humanoid footprints belong to Neanderthals.

Matalascañas still remains as an international holiday paradise with a local population of around 3,000 people, which boosts up to roughly 150,000 people during the summer. It currently offers around 100 restaurants, 10 hotels, 7 lifeguard stations, 9 public restrooms, public bus lines, taxi lines and touristic local trains. It has been awarded blue flags and Q and SICTED certificates for touristic quality

== Physical location ==
=== Urban resort ===
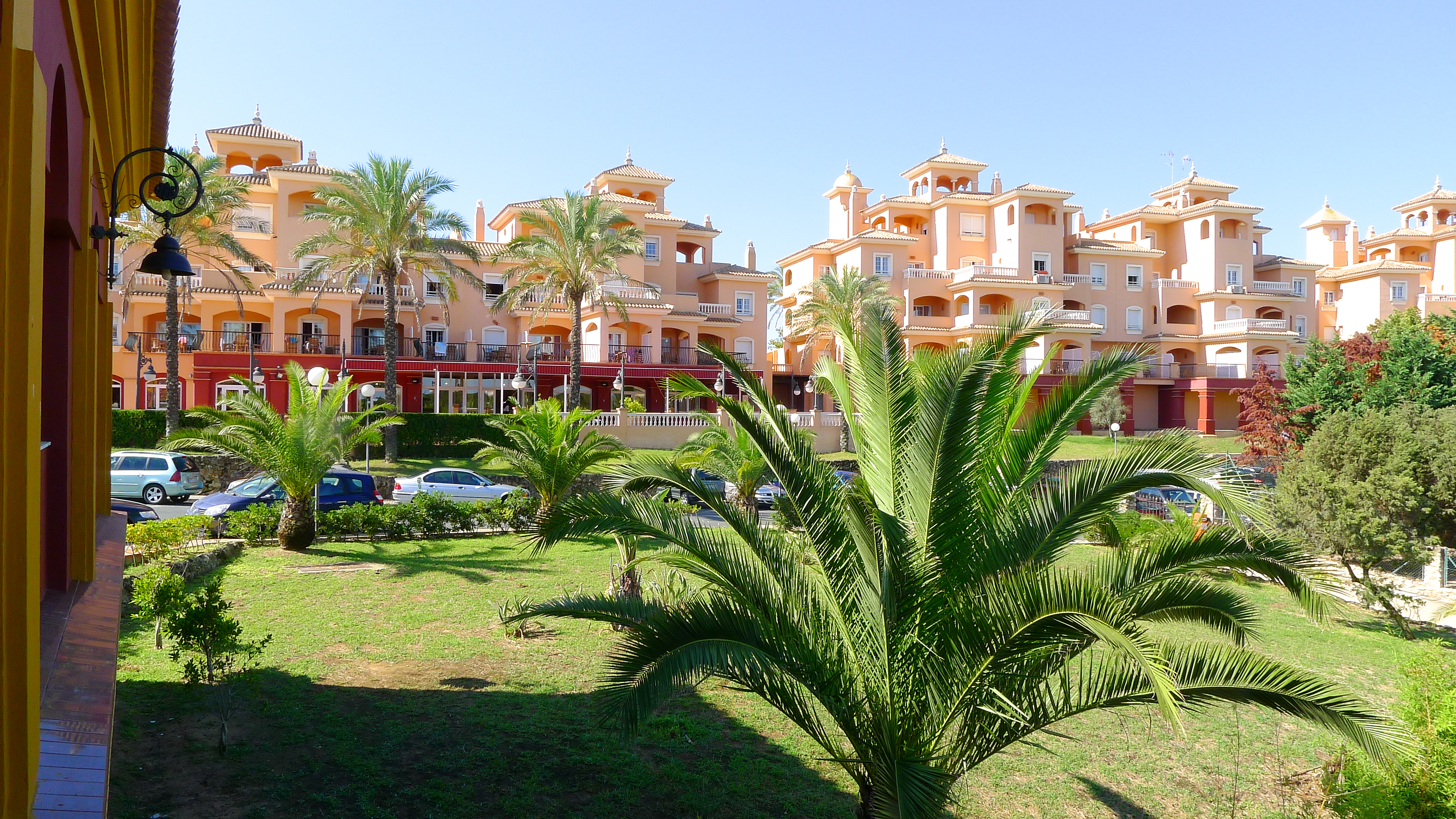
District K, surrounded by the Golf Course.

The town of Matalascañas is a 4-km long strip along the coast of Almonte, halfway between the ruins of Torre del Oro and river Guadalquivir. It is one kilometer wide and is delimited from the Doñana National Park by the fenced north road which stretches the whole strip from east to west. That north road starts with a big roundabout decorated with trees, deer sculptures and the name of the town and provides access to the different districts (in Spanish, sectores) through 8 different roundabouts, all of them with a monument on top representing different local and regional customs. These are, from west to east: the Earth, the Dolmens, the Ship, the Dolphins, the Windows, the Tower and the Winery. There is a main avenue with wide pavements and many businesses from the main roundabout towards the ruins of Torre de la Higuera called Avenida de las Adelfas (oleander avenue). The town is separated from the shore by a 2.5-mile pedestrian promenade (4 km long).

The town is divided into 27 districts named after different local terms related to nature and arranged alphabetically from 'A' to 'T'. 6 of these districts, namely K, O, P, Q, R and S make up the popular area known as Caño Guerrero (warrior stream), which has the highest population density and most businesses. The eastern area of town, built more recently, is organised in seven different districts named from “a” to “g” (in lower case, to tell them apart from the capital letter ones). Here are the different districts with detailed information:

- Parque Dunar – as mentioned before, it is a protected exurban area west from town where many different touristic and environmental buildings can be found, including the tourist office, the museum, the research centre, the cultural centre Balcón del Atlántico, the lighthouse, the horse riding club “El Pasodoble”, the camel riding club “Aires Africanos”, the Civil Guard headquarters, a gym, several restaurants and the bus station.
- District A - Ánade Real (mallard)- Commonly referred to as “El Centro” (the centre), it is the most popular and one of the busiest neighbourhoods, known for its nightlife. It is full of disco pubs, restaurants, shops, etc. The main square and the Parish of San Francisco de Asís are also found in this district.
- District B - Brazo de la Torre (Tower Arm) - This is a residential neighbourhood named after a river arm that supplies water to the Doñana park. The oldest building in town (El Delfín) can be found here.
- District C – Cerceta (teal)- Located on the beachfront, this is also a residential area which includes the popular building “El Sancho”, many beach restaurants and several pricey houses.
- District D - Dehesa de las Marismas (marsh meadows) – A very touristic district, it includes the outdoor cinema “Doñana”, one of the main supermarkets, two popular hotels (Flamero and ON Village) along with popular restaurant “Titanic”.
- District E – Enea (bulrush)– It has one of the three main avenues in town, with the popular roundabout of Goya and the picturesque hotel Cortijo.
- District F – Flamenco (flamingo) – This district is mainly residential.
- District G – Gallareta (waterhen)– This is a residential district in the northern part of town which has a skatepark, two wide public squares and a basket court.
- District H - Halcón Peregrino (peregrine falcon) - The post office and the popular building La Prensa are located here.
- District I – Inglesillo (little Englishman) - This is the first district found at the entrance of town and has public school El Zampullín and several hotels.
- District J - Golf Course – it is a 290,000 m^{2} golf course with 18 holes opened in 2000.
- District K – Junco (rush) – This is a residential district completely surrounded by the golf course, except for a two-way access street in the eastern part which merges into district O.
- District L - Laguna del Sopetón (soup lake) - this district is located west from the golf course and includes the police and local government headquarters, the main school Dunas de Doñana, the main sport centre, a karting circuit and two popular hotels (ON: The Residence and Carabela).
- District M – Malvasía (white-headed duck) – It is a beachfront district with famous hotel “ON: Oceanfront” (which includes both a Japanese and a Mexican restaurant).
- District N – Nutria (otter) – A monumental beachfront district colindante which includes the emblematic pedestrian street Calle Azul (blue street), which ends at the Sun roundabout. The lifeguard headquarters, the popular restaurant “El Pato”, popular green residential building “Atlántico“ and the exclusive neighbourhood “Kabila I“.
- District O – Ostrero (oystercatcher) – It is one of the districts within the “Caño Guerrero” area, containing the access to district K and to the golf course, next to hotel “Dunas de Doñana Golf Resort”.
- District P – Palmito (heart of palm)- This district is the “heart” of Caño Guerrero and the busiest area of town. Full of tall buildings, it includes many shops, restaurants and emblematic monuments, such as the fountain roundabaout, the clam fisher roundabout, a replica of the Sea Gate of Almonte and the Neptuno Square.
- District Q – Quercus (oak)– This is a small northern residential neighbourhood.
- District R – Retama (rotem) – This T-shaped residential neighbourhood still has some non-urban areas, for it is next to the end of town, close to the national park.
- District S - Somormujo (great crested grebe) - it has the well-known arena Surfasaurus, which has hosted all kind of events and summer concerts, including Julio Iglesias. It also has an industrial state with several workshops and supermarkets and the Victoria Park.
- District T - Torre Zalabar (Zalabar Tower) – It is a popular beachfront district which includes the exclusive neighbourhood Pueblo Andaluz and a circular water tank decorated as a bull ring, with several bull sculptures next to it. It is named after one of the 16th-century watchtowers found all along the coast.
- District a – Aulaga (scorpion broom) – small residential neighbourhood which is only partially urbanised and next to the national park.
- District b – Boliche (burnt mound) – residential neighbourhood exclusively consisting of gardened detached houses.
- District c - Calamón (swamphen)- It is the last district at the end of town, in its southeastern area, limiting with the national park. Expensive beachfront detached houses can be found here, along with some beach restaurants and fishermen huts.
- District d - Dunas (dunes) - It is the easternmost district at the end of the urban area and includes the biggest hotel in town (Gran Hotel El Coto). It also has a 19,000m^{2}park with green zones, sand and a child playground. One of the main gates to access the national park is also in this district.
- District e - Eucalipto (eucalyptus) - it is next to district “b” and includes the popular Red Buildings, a recycling centre and an upcoming hotel.
- District f - Fumarel black tern – Easternmost district up north of town, limiting with the national park and virtually wild.
- District g - Garza Imperial (purple heron)– Half-urbanised district containing one of the biggest and most groundbreaking hotel complexes in Southern Spain, “ON City Resort”. This huge hotel includes around 70 single apartments with a picturesque style which combines ibizan architecture with the typical color apartments and palm streets that remind of Venice Beach. The complex also contains a huge water park inside.

Map of Matalascañas:

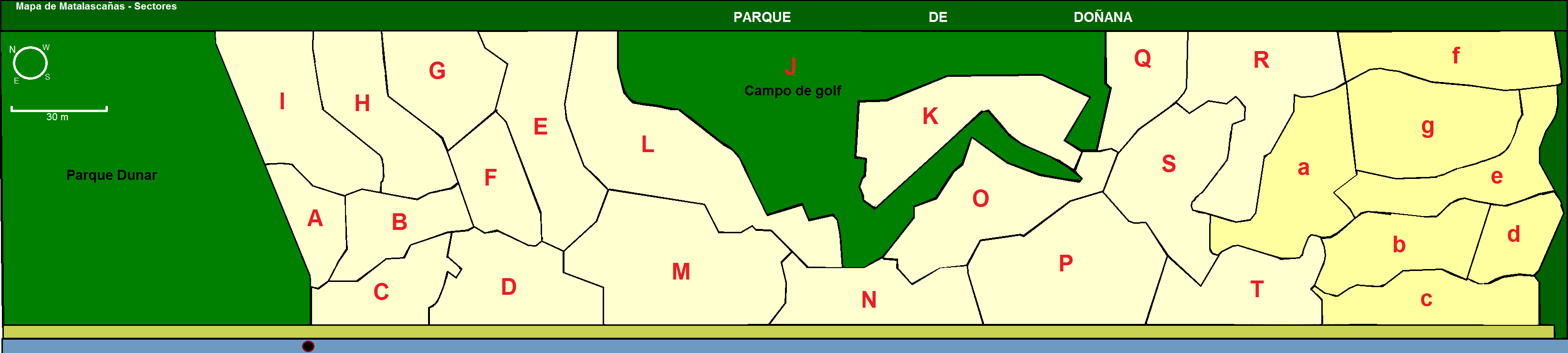

=== Natural environment ===
The physical geography of the area involves semi-fossil dunes a few metters high, whose altitude gradually increases as you move west from town until reaching 100 meters at El Asperillo, declared an Andalusian Natural Monument and the highest dune cliff in Europe. The shore is made of fine grain light golden sand and vegetation is scarce, being abundant only from the top of the dunes inwards. The climate is temperate, with warm and fresh summers and cool winters, combining both mediterranean and atlantic influences. The hottest month is August, with an average high of 26 °C (78F) and coldest month is January, with average ow of 12.5 °C (55F). This makes Almonte's coast a global climatic paradise. These are some of the most common plants and animals found in the surrounding areas of the Doñana National Park:

==== Flora ====
- Strawberry tree
- Grey-leaved cistus
- Stone pine
- Juniper
- Sictus tree
- Marram grass
- Crowberry
- Rosemary
- Wild liquorice
- Spanish lavender and Thymus
- Rockrose
- Narrow-leaved mock privet

==== Fauna ====
- Iberian lynx
- Spanish imperial eagle
- Spiny-footed lizard
- Large psammodromus
- Griffon vulture
- Iberian magpie
- European goldfinch
- European serin
- European badger
- Red fox
- Garden warbler
- European rabbit
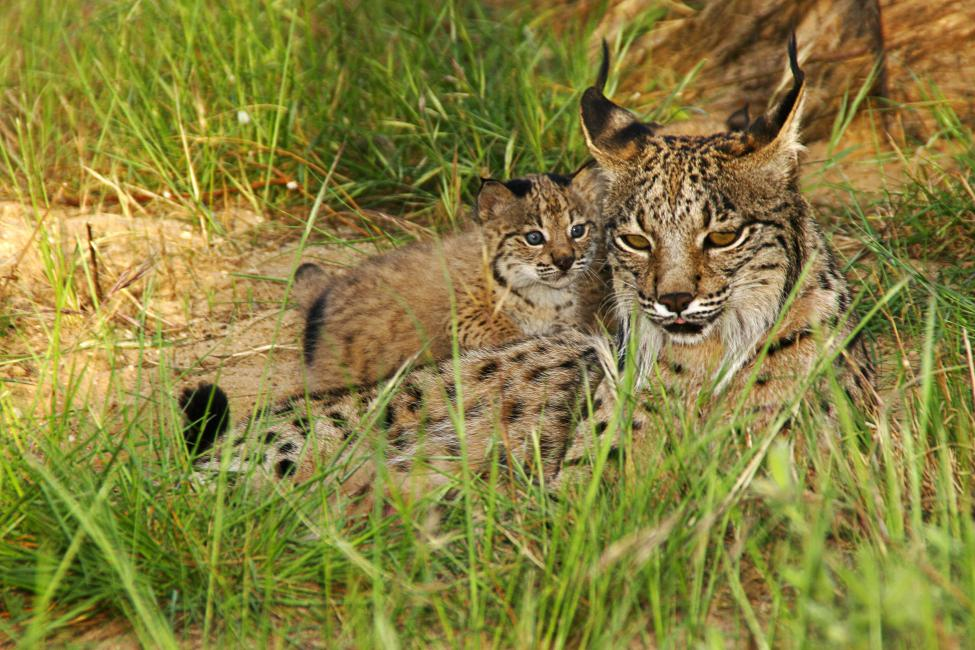
Iberian lynx

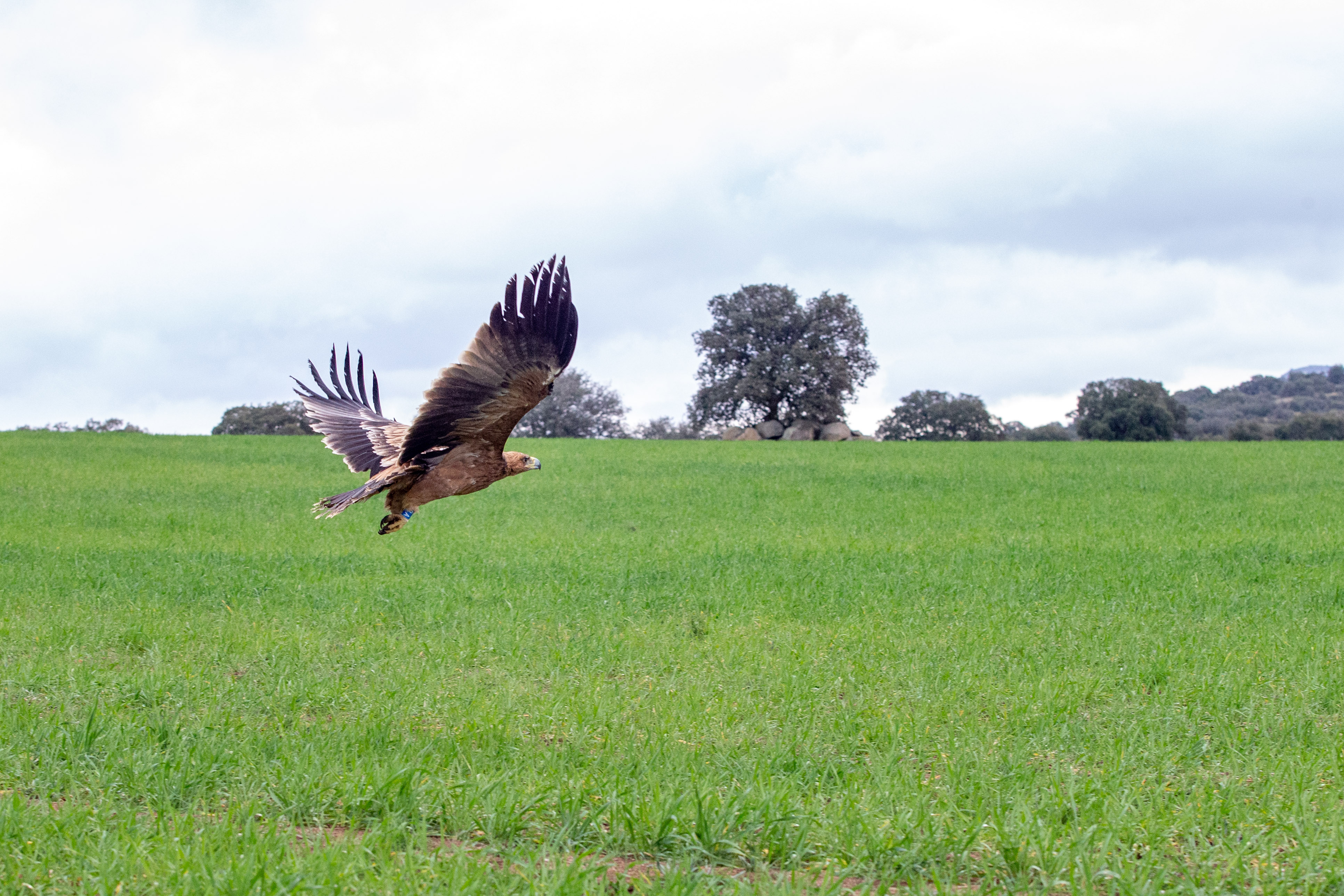
Imperial Eagle

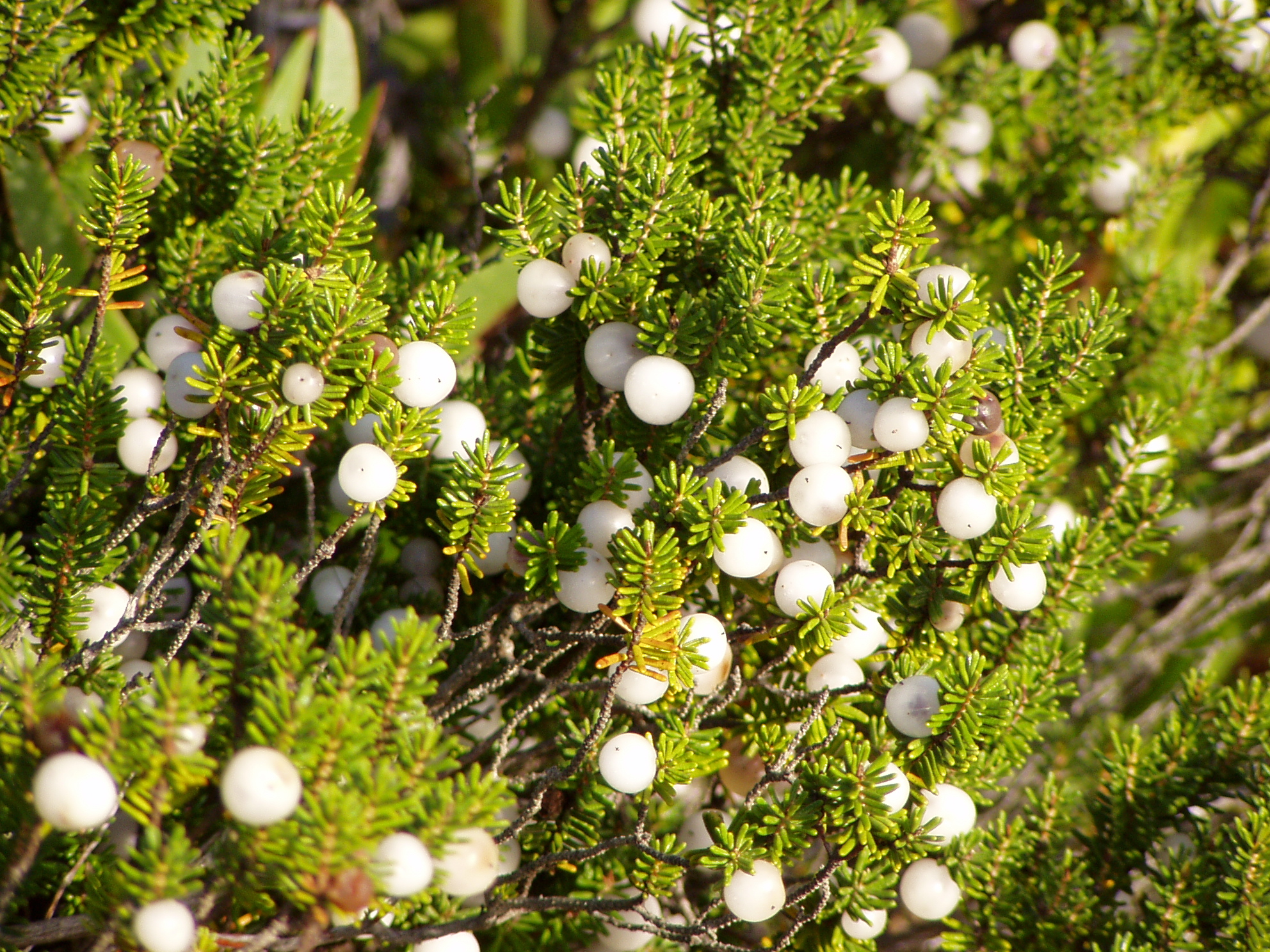
Crowberries

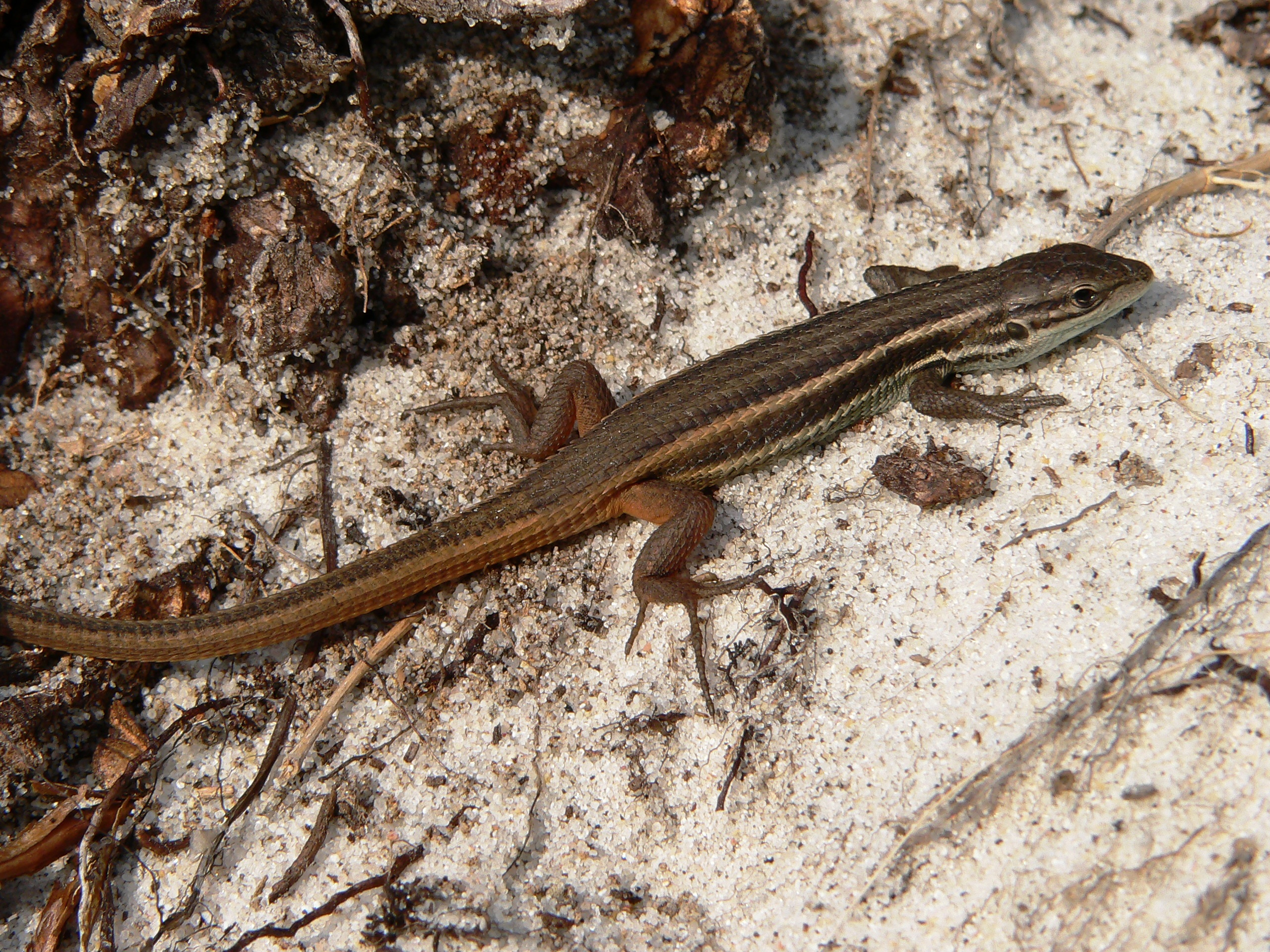
Psammodromus

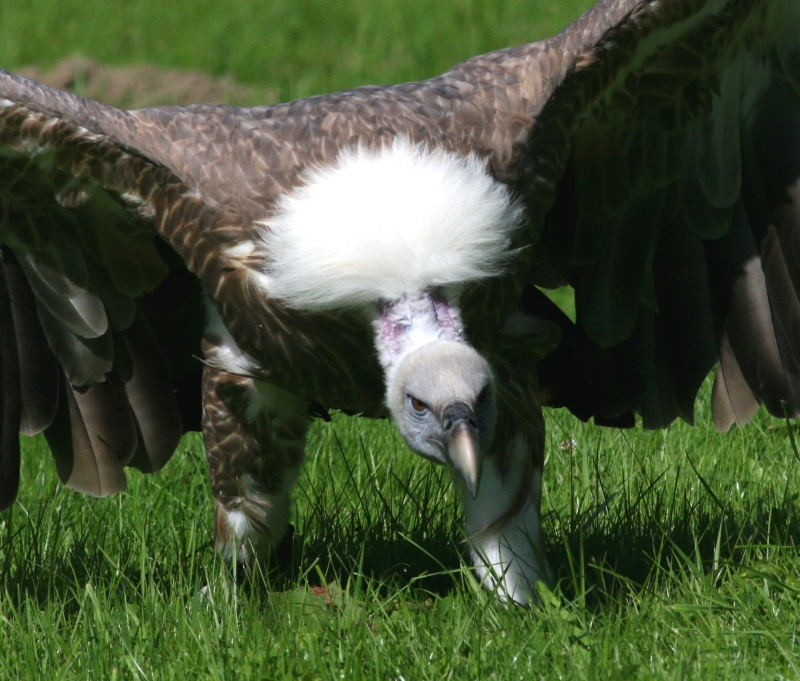
Griffon Vulture

== Government and politics ==
Along with the worldwide-known village of El Rocío, Matalascañas is administered by the council of Almonte, which has permanent headquarters in district L, just next to the golf course and the police station, so the neighbours don't have to move to the main town up north to meet some of their basic administrative needs. Matalascañas’ location inside the heart of the national park has brought about concerns and controversies for several decades regarding noise and light pollution, water management, roadkills and littering. A balance between Almonte's economic and industrial development and the sustainable and green conservation of its natural environment has been the historical goal of locals since the establishment of the park in the late 60s. From May to September, when the floating population of the municipality skyrockets up to 200,000 people in summer and more than 1 million during the Pilgrimage of El Rocío, The local government has to implement different programmes which often involves coordination at a European level. Security, waste management and cleaning, pavement and road maintenance and traffic are some examples of the challenges the local government has to face. As for water consumption, it has been proven that dryness in the area is rather related to northern watering crops than to the coastal resort itself. The council of Almonte is working along with the Ministry for the Environment on a project to switch the current water supply network from the aquifer to another one which comes from the eastern part of the province and, at the same time, placing a new wastewater treatment plant nearby the village of El Rocío, to avoid further pouring into the sea. Another challenging issue in town is traffic, specially during the summer. Both circulating and parking across town may be a problem due to summer population peaks, along with road clogging at summer weekends and asphalt and pavement damage. Parking regulation has been proposed by the council to help solve this problem, with a €40 million contract with a private company in 2025. The company will provide the parking meters, hire locals and paint the different signs and will also be in charge of restoring the asphalt of the whole town in advance and maintain it for the next 30 years. More than €6 million have been invested in 2024 regarding litter collection, hiring more than 80 locals and with a new company hired to work at the 3 urban areas at once (Almonte, El Rocío and Matalascañas itself). The recycling centre is operating and litter collection is specially reinforced during the summer, with special vehicles patrolling the seaside promenade and helping beach restaurants unload their packaging waste. Finally, the maintenance of the beach and the promenade comes at a high cost for the local, regional and national governments. In order to cope with winter sea storm damage on the shore, millions of euros are spent annually on sand and pavement restoration, with an investment of €6 million in restoring 700,000m^{3} (24 million ft^{3}) of sand in 2024.

== Transport ==
Its unique location inside the Doñana National Park, the biggest natural reserve in Europe, has limited the urban expansion of the resort, as well as the different ways of access. There are three main ways to reach the town:

=== Road A-483 ===
This road goes up north and connects to the main town of Almonte, first bypassing the worldwide-known village of El Rocío (a stretch in which it becomes a highway) and eventually merging into A-49, one of the main highways that connects Spain to Portugal. This road also provides access to headquarters of the local agricultural companies and industrial estate Matalagrana, one of the main ones in southwestern Spain. It is also used to get to the neoclassical Palace of El Acebrón.

=== Road A-494 ===
It goes west parallel to the coast and connects to Huelva. There is an 18-mile cycle lane parallel to this road that connects to neighbour town of Mazagón, allowing pedestrian access to different landmarks of the coast of Almonte, like Heidy Beach (a dog friendly beach), Cuesta Maneli Beach, Torre del Oro Beach and the rocket launching platform Campo de Tiro del Médano del Oro.

=== Ferry ===
There is also a regular ferry line that crosses river Guadalquivir, from Almonte to Cádiz. It sets sail from El Poblado de la Plancha and arrives at Sanlúcar de Barrameda. Private sailing is also available from the 4 different nautical clubs in town.

== Science, culture and historical heritage ==
The coast of Almonte has a temperate climate that allows a wide variety of scientific, sportive and cultural events to take place in Matalascañas and nearby coastal areas. While sportive and cultural events are almost exclusively funded by the town council along with local businesses, scientific ones are often carried out either at a national or European level, for they often concern national security or the preservation of the Doñana National Park.

=== Aerospace technology ===
In the 60s, the government installed a military training and rocket launching base on the west coast, near the medieval ruins of Torre del Loro. The unique climate of the coast, with storms and other extreme events rarely happening, has made it a perfect spot for military and spacecraft manoeuvres. Soldiers from many countries train there and the rocket platform allowed the launch of Miura 1, the first recoverable launch vehicle in Europe, which was carried out at 2am on Saturday, October 7, 2023. The base is currently administered by the Spanish National Institute for Aerospace Technology. NASA has also provided high-tech radar technology and there are both European and American scientists working in there. A rising local interest in astrophysics led to the opening of an astronomical observatory in 2010, inaugurated by CSIC's astrophysicist and cosmologist Juan P. Mercader. It is located in Almonte, behind the CIECEMA (International Centre for Environmental Studies), in the north part of town. Many scientific organisations and amateur groups gather around the Matalascañas's lighthouse to observe lunar eclipses, for the area has little light pollution and the sky is clear at night. Almonte also organises an event called “Ciencia al Fresquito”, held at night in the summer at park Clara Campoamor, which is rather elevated. Anyone can use several telescopes to observe the night sky at this event.

=== Culture and tourism ===
==== Gastronomy ====
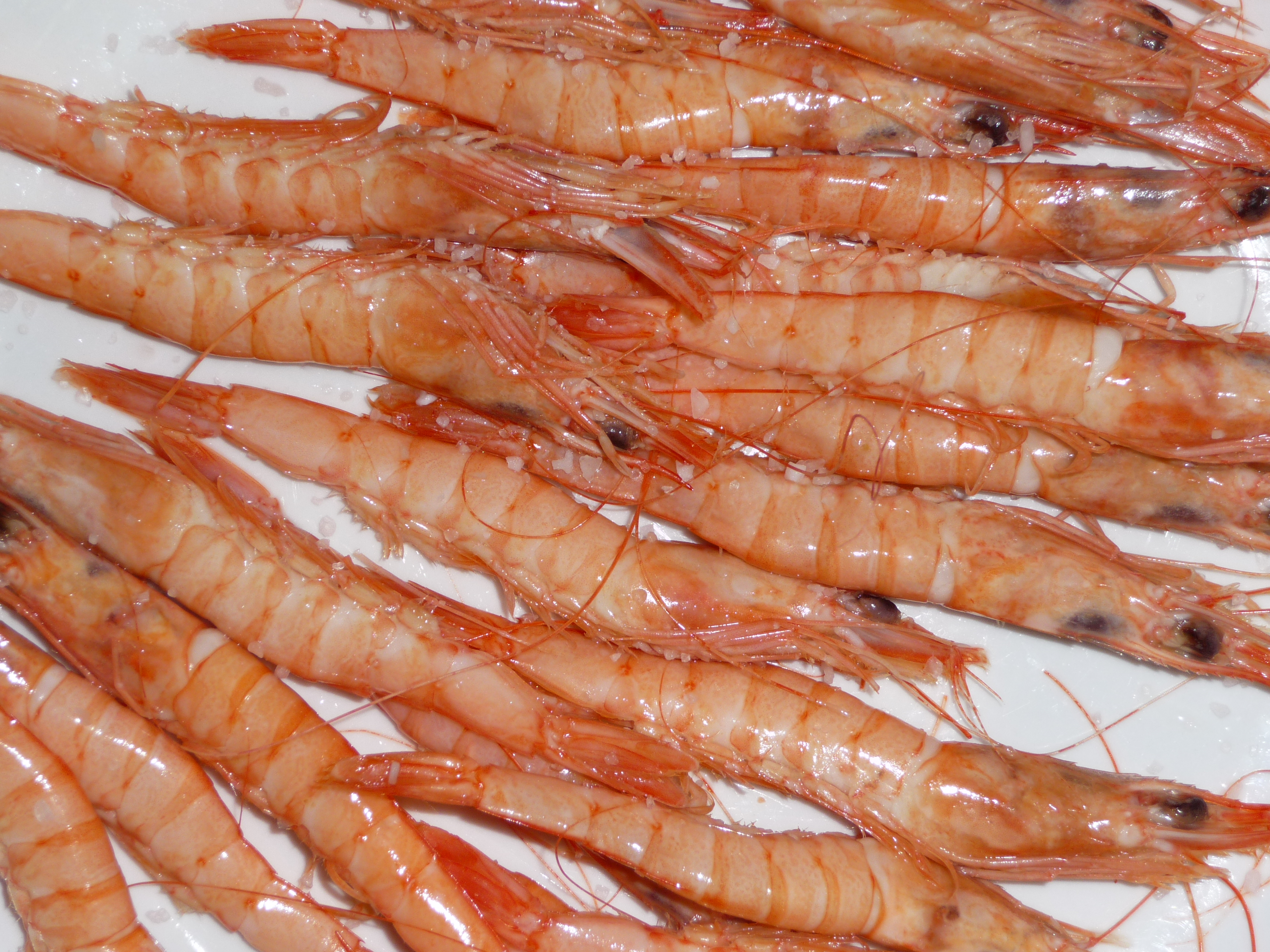
Gamba blanca, a delicacy of the coast

Typical food from Almonte include fish and seafood, which can be found in different restaurants of the main town itself and also in El Rocío and Matalascañas, specially at beachfront restaurants. Gamba blanca de Huelva (Huelva's white prawn), coquinas (clams), chocos (cuttles), sardines, ortiguillas (snakelocks), seabass, seabream, atlantic pomfret or black paella are the most typical fresh dishes that can be ordered in the area. The first two species, namely white prawns and coquinas, are native to the area and can't be found in neighbouring areas like Portugal or Cádiz. Furthermore, the so-called langostino de Sanlúcar (Sanlúcar's prawn) is actually captured in the coast of Almonte. There are more than 100 restaurants in the coastal town, including grill houses, pizzerias and Italian, Japanese and Mexican restaurants. Beachfront restaurants and the ones at the main square are typically the oldest and long-running ones.

==== Museum ====
Located inside the Parque dunar, the Museo del Mundo Marino (Sea museum) was a scientific and historical complex opened in 2002, with an investment of €6 million, being one of the two museums in Spain to be certified with ISO 9001 and 14001 and AENOR. It had six main rooms and included the only complete orca skeleton in Europe, 17 real-scale mockups, 12 other skeletons of whales and other sea animals hanging down the roof and the biggest collection of shells and molluscs in Spain. The main attraction was a self-sustained spherical sealed ecosystem designed by NASA And branded Ecosphere, of which only one more replica was available at that time. It was designed for space flight and contains different species of shrimps, algae and bacteria. Different souvenir replicas were sold at the museum shop and more than 30,000 visitors got to know the centre each year. After the elections of 2011, when mayor Francisco Bella left after 20 years in charge, a coalition was formed by right-wing PP and left-wing IU. The latter, at a regional level, sanctioned the two councillors who made it possible for PP to govern Almonte. In January 2012, the museum owed its private stockholders more than €187,000 and the regional government (Junta de Andalucía) was providing a grant which would help solve the financial crisis, but 25% of that money was to arrive yet. The new local council decided to close the museum without receiving the rest of the grant and all the content of the centre was taken to Seville. In 2023, after former mayor Francisco Bella had been reelected, the new local council announced the reopening of the museum, which would start by turning the former building into a centre for digital resources.

==== Cinema and theatre ====
As for film services, there is a 2-screen outdoor cinema in northwestern district D, next to the supermarket, called Cine Doñana. The local ciuncil has been projecting films at the beach during the summer for many years, specially in crowded areas nearby the beachfront restaurants. Regarding filming, the surrounding coastal areas have been used as set for multiple awarded films, such as The Neverending Story or Lawrence of Arabia, shot in the nearby dunes of Doñana. For more details, visit the main article film section. The theatre is located at the tourist officeBalcón del Atlántico, in district Parque Dunar and it is an outdoor area consisting of a stage with several seating rows both in front and behind the stage, at an upper level. Several plays, concerts and other activities take place in the theatre every summer.

==== Horse and camel riding ====
At the very beginning of town, in the western area, there are three different local businesses involved in animal activities, horse riding clubs El Pasodoble And horse riding school Amigos del Caballo. The first one organises horse riding routes at several levels and the latter provides horse riding lessons and includes a 2,200m^{2} arena which hosts international championships and contests. Environmental association Aires Africanos Owns a big farm with several camels, llamas and horses. It organises camel riding routes around the area and also provides lessons. They also sell handmade camel milk soap.

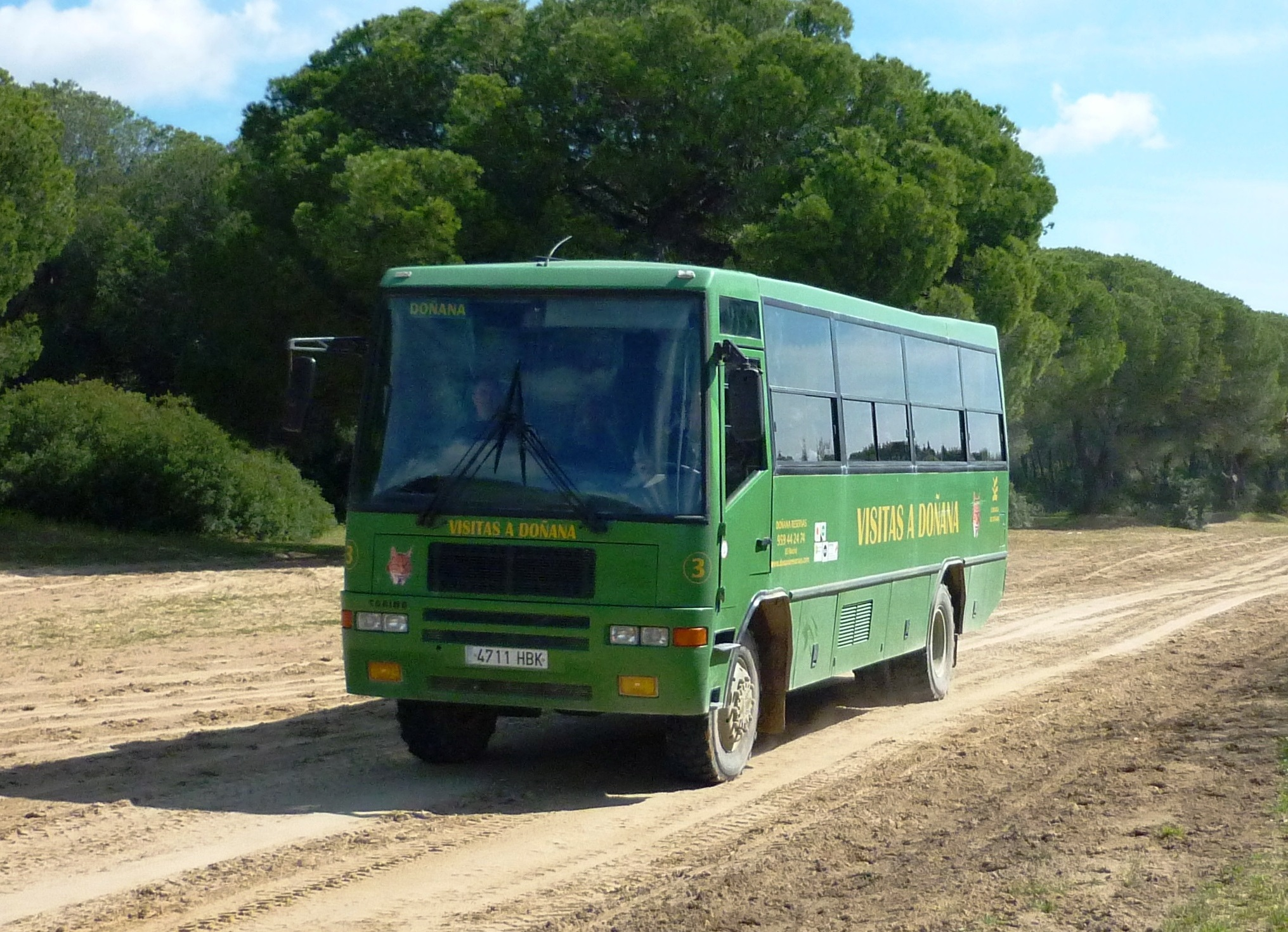
All-terrain minibus visiting the park

==== National park visits ====
There are many ways to visit the Doñana National Park, both using public and private services. Most public visits are organised by the council of Almonte and often involve groups of specific visitors (elderly, students, etc.). Within the private sector, guided visits by all-terrain minibuses can be booked at the visitor's centre El Acebuche, 6.5 km north from town. The best period to visit the park goes from December to June, specially Spring, when temperatures are optimal and the park is at its greenest and wettest. Official private visits often start at El Acebuche and access the park through Matalascañas. Main landmarks inside the park include: tha marsh of El Rocío, the meadows, the woods, official residence Palacio de Las Marismillas, the dunes, the beach and visitor's recreative area Poblado de la Plancha. Several modalities are available, from quick visits a few hours long to full-day experiences including lunch in Sanlúcar, crossing river Guadalquivir.

==== Heritage ====
Three main historical landmarks can be found in Matalascañas or its surroundings, but as the main section about heritage of the municipality describes, more than 20 different historical landmarks are spread through Almonte's territory. Some of them are in ruins and other are in good conditions and even in use.

- Holocene fossil footprints

Once Heidi Beach is left behind heading west, several extinct ungulate's tracks can be found on the clay substratum that lies beneath the sand. They date back from 100,000 BC and include wolf, aurochs, palaeoloxodon, red deer, wild boar, wader and anatidae. They can be observed only when the tide is low and the sand moves back. There is an environmental association called “Parque Dunar”, which organises free guided tours that include historical and geological commentaries and a voluntary litter collection. In a recent research published by Quaternary Science Reviews and carried out by the University of Huelva, it has been confirmed that the humanoid footprints belong to Neanderthals.

- Fortified towers

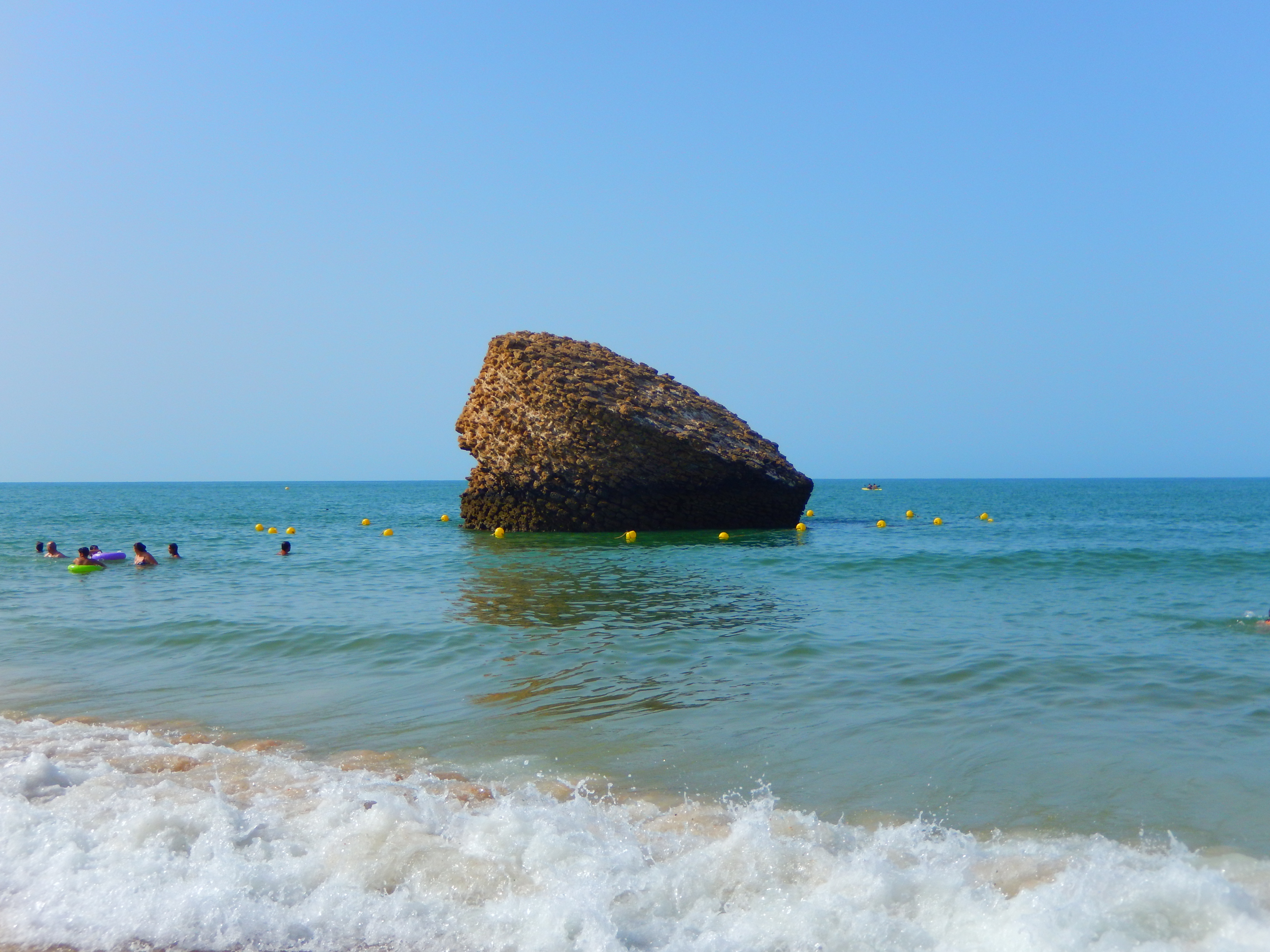
Ruins of Torre de la Higuera

King Philip II of Spain ordered the construction of a series of watchtowers during the 16th century to prevent Northern African invasions from the sea, given the multiple wars that Spain was waging at that moment. At least six of these towers are located within Almonte's territory. These are, from east to west: Torre del Oro (Tower of the Golden River), Torre del Asperillo, Torre de la Higuera (Tower of the Fig tree), Torre Carbonero (Charcoal Tower), Torre Zalabar and Torre San Jacinto (St J's Tower). All of them are declared Bien de Interés Cultural (Cultural Interest Asset), a protected cultural status in Spain. The first three towers are in ruins, while the last three can be observed as they originally were. Torre de la Higuera is the only one of the towers located within the Matalascañas Beach, at the beginning of town and has become a symbol for Almonte, often appearing in postcards and other touristic elements.

- World War II bunkers

There are several bunkers from World War II in the shore next to the delta of river Guadalquivir, in different coastal points. An activity called “Descubre tus fortalezas” (literally “Discover your fortresses”) carries out guided tours to these remains, with historians, architects and archaeologists participating. The bunkers were built by order of Franco in 1943 in fear of being invaded by the allied troops during the North African campaign. Another way of sightseeing the bunkers is booking a guided visit to the park, but it doesn't include walking in this zone.

=== Sports ===
Almonte, like other coastal municipalities of southern Spain, enjoys a stable temperate weather that has made it possible to boost outdoor sport activities. Both the council and private investment have sport promotion as a priority, mainly fishing, horse and camel riding, golf, sailing, paragliding, cycling, volleyball and running.

==== Sailing, fishing and paragliding ====
There are four nautical clubs in Matalascañas. The main one started as a fishing local club opened in the 70s, later becoming the first nautical club. It is located less than 1 km west from town and can be accessed by car using the first roundabout in road A-494, as you exit the main roundabout at the entrance of Matalascañas. It stores up to 140 boats on land, being towed down the dune to the sea for sailing, using a delimited area where only sailing is allowed. Next to the club there is a restaurant. Once the nautical buoys are left behind and heading west, Heidi's Beach can be found. It is one of the most liberal beaches in Southern Spain, being LGBT-friendly, dog-friendly and having nude zones. Heading east, opposite the dog beach, there is a restaurant on top of the dune called Bananas and next to it an area used for paragliding, taking advantage of the dune cliff. Another sailing club is Torre Almenara, in district N, on the shore, with smaller boats and kayaks. Fishing clubs and shops, watercraft, paddle boats, floating bouncy castles, windsurf and amateur fishing are usual as well all along town.

==== Golf ====
In 1998, the works began for the first green golf course in Europe, meeting eco-friendly standards. With year-round golf season, Bermuda fairways, 18 holes and 290,000m^{2}, it opened in 2000 As Dunas de Doñana Golf. The local government, led by Francisco Bella and company Sierra Clara provided funding, with design by Fernando Menaya. The most innovative aspect that makes it unique is its system of watering with recycled water. In 2009, the council of Almonte acquired the rest of the golf course for €7.5 million, getting full ownership and rented it to a new leaseholder, Doñana De Silva Golf. It was closed in 2016 due to disagreements between the new leaseholder and the new elected local government regarding the quality of watering. It held all kind of regional, national and international contests and championships, including the Campeonato de España de Profesionales (Spanish Professional Championship). In 2017, the Supreme Court of Spain ruled in favour of the purchase of the course in 2009 by the council. In 2023, former mayor Francisco Bella was reelected and announced a reopening of the golf course in the following years.

==== Kart racing, cycling and jogging ====
There is a 3,400m^{2} karting circuit with 9 curves, located in district L, next to the north road and the police headquarters. It has also a 900m^{2} paddock area next to the circuit. Borth karting and motocross are popular sports in Almonte. As for biking, there is an 18-mile cycle lane (30 km) parallel to the north road all alog town and continuing towards the neighbouring town of Mazagón, to the west. It allows access to different beaches of Almonte's coast both walking and by bike (Heidi Beach, Cuesta Maneli Beach and Torre del Oro Beach. Cycling tourism is also practised, with companies like Doñanatour Or eco-friendly group Doñabike, promoting electric bikes Championships like Doñana Natural, which started in 2012 are also popular in the area, including routes across the natural park. Finally, jogging and hiking need to be mentioned as the most popular outdoor activity in the area, taking advantage of the vast shores, the beachfront promenade, the pedestrian path parallel to the north road and the different official routes inside the heart of Doñana. Different marathons are held every year, the most popular one being the 9-mile Carrera Nocturna (Night Race) sponsored by local sport club Espartanosand carried out at the beach since 2013.

==== Volleyball and beach paddle ====
Beach volleyball has been for decades the most popular group sport at the beach. It is practised both at an official level and by amateur groups, though only the first modality is officially allowed. There is an annual regional championship normally held in Matalascañas. In 2024, more than 200 teams from all over the province participated in the XXVI Circuito Provincial (regional championship), spending more than 12 hours playing in 4 different categories. Beach paddle is exclusively practised at non-professional levels by locals and tourists, but is still a widespread sport activity.
