= Tío Pepe (disambiguation) =

Tio pepe may refer to:

- Tío Pepe, a Spanish brand name of sherry
- Tio Pepe, a stage play by Matthew Lopez, directed by Caitlin Moon, enacted at the 2008 Summer Play Festival
