= Herbero =

Spanish liquor

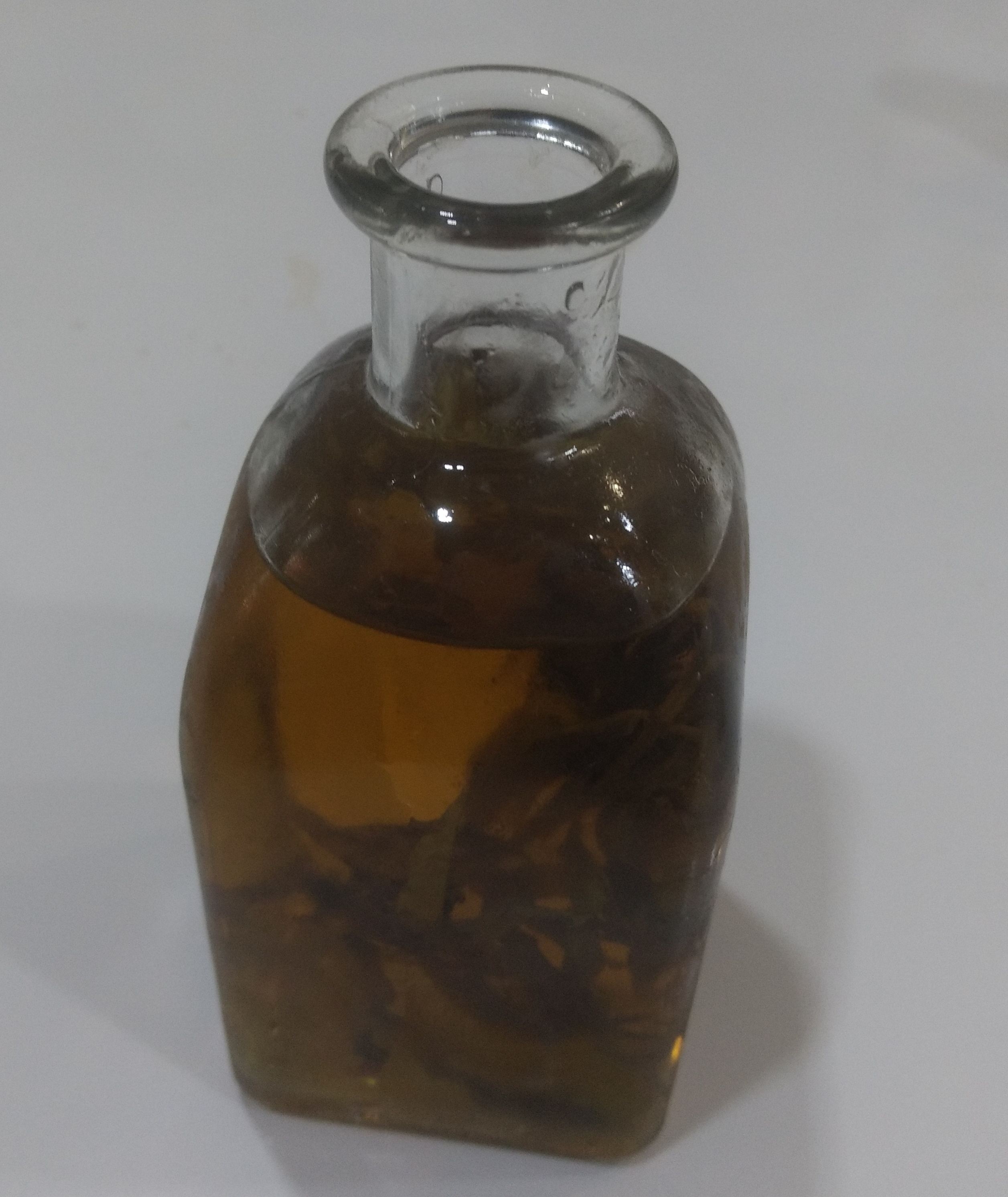
A bottle of Herbero

Herbero is a liquor made in the Sierra de Mariola region in the northern part of the Spanish province of Alicante. This mountain range is famous for its abundance of medicinal and aromatic plants, some of which are used to make the herbero liquor. Herbero is often found in a regional cocktail called mesclaet.

The drink originated during the Moorish occupation of Spain, when the Moors brought distilling technology to the peninsula.

Herbero is obtained from the distillation or maceration of plants collected in the mountain range with a grain alcohol solution with between 22% and 40% alcoholic content. The color of the resulting liquor may be transparent, or it may vary from yellow to clear green to red.

The plants used in the production of herbero include at least four of the following: sage, chamomile, pennyroyal, lemon verbena, the root of the blessed thistle, peppermint, cattail, fennel, anise, melissa, agrimony, savory, felty germander, thyme, and French lavender.

Its production is regulated by the denominación de origen "Distilled spirits of Alicante" together with anise paloma, café licor from Alcoy, and cantueso.
