= Manuel Críspulo González y Soto =

Manuel Críspulo González y Soto, 1st Marquis of Bonanza
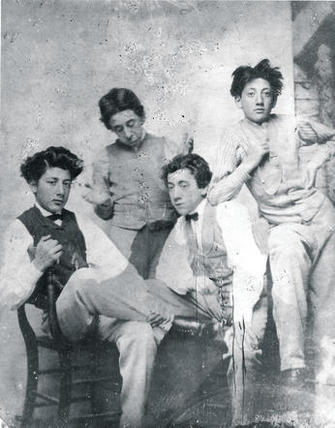
- González y Soto (far left) at St. Edward's College, Liverpool in 1860
- Born: 10 June 1846; Jerez de la Frontera, Spain
- Died: 16 October 1933 (aged 87); Jerez de la Frontera, Spain
- Known for: head of family business González Byass, philanthropy
- Title: Marques of Bonanza (1902–1933)
- Spouse: Doña María Josefa de Ágreda y Pérez de Grandallana
- Children: 7

Don Manuel Críspulo González y Soto, 1st Marquis of Bonanza (10 June 1846 – 16 October 1933), was a Spanish entrepreneur of the González Byass wine and sherry company and a philanthropist.

== Early life ==
González y Soto was born in Jerez de la Frontera, in Southern Spain, on 10 June 1846 as the fifth of a total of nine children. His father was Don Manuel María González y Angel, founder of wine and sherry bodega González Byass, his mother was Doña Victoriana Soto y Lavaggi. González y Angel had founded his wine company in 1835, aged 23. Five years later he had founded the corporation González & Dubosc with Juan Bautista Dubosc and Francisco Gutiérrez de Agüera, and the company was among the nine largest exporters of Spain. By the time of Manuel Críspulo's birth the González y Angel family was already considered among the most successful and wealthy of the city. Manuel Críspulo was sent to the United Kingdom to be schooled at St. Edward's College, Liverpool and was a student there in 1860. He was later sent to other places in Europe to finish his education and perfect his English and French.

== Professional life and philanthropy ==
When González y Soto finished his education he returned to Spain and became director of the family business. From the 1870s the second generation González family members were in charge of the company, led by Manuel Críspulo and his brother Pedro Nolasco. Under their oversight the company expanded further, including to the production of brandy and liqueurs. A logo for the label Tío Pepe was also created. Apart from his work at González Byass, Manuel Críspulo González y Soto was member of the organizing commission of the second region of the somatén, a civil watch, instituted by Miguel Primo de Rivera in the 1920s.

In Jerez de la Frontera he founded the Philharmonic Academy and the Santo Domingo School of Fine Art. He was a patron of the School of Applied Arts and Artist Workers in the same city. He also donated money for a painting of the Battle of Clavijo for the Santiago church in Jerez de la Frontera. He also financed and partially donated money for the railway line of la Sierra in 1901. On his own lands he also had the spa of San Telmo constructed, a place which locals and people from all over Spain visited. One hall of the complex was dedicated for locals who could not afford treatment therapies and the lower ranked soldiers from the military garrison of Jerez de la Frontera. The local bourgeoisie also held parties at San Telmo.

González y Soto donated lands in Sanlúcar de Barrameda to the wounded soldiers of the wars in Cuba and the Philippines.

== Personal life ==
On 30 November 1870 he married Doña María Josefa de Ágreda y Pérez de Grandallana. Together with her he had seven children.

- Don Manuel Francisco González y de Ágreda (born 4 July 1873)
- Don Diego Luis González y de Ágreda (born 13 June 1878, died 14 July 1901)
- Doña María Josefa González y de Ágreda (born 8 April 1877)
- Doña Petra González y de Ágreda (born 26 November 1878, died 10 April 1921)
- Don José Luis González y de Ágreda, 2nd Marquis of Bonanza (born 30 March 1881)
- Doña Isabel González y de Ágreda, 3rd Marquessa of Bonanza (born 19 November 1883)
- Doña María de los Angeles González y de Ágreda (born 23 November 1884, died 25 January 1922)

== Awards ==
He was made 1st Marquis of Bonanza on 6 February 1902 by Queen Regent Maria Christina of Austria, mother to the underage king Alfonso XIII of Spain. For his service to the establishment of the somatén in the second region he was awarded a Grand Cross of Military Merit on 6 April 1926. He was also Knight in the Order of Charles III and Commander in the Order of Isabella the Catholic. He held a golden medal awarded by the Red Cross as well.

Spanish nobility
Preceded by New creation	Marquis of Bonanza; 1902–1933	Succeeded by José Luis González
