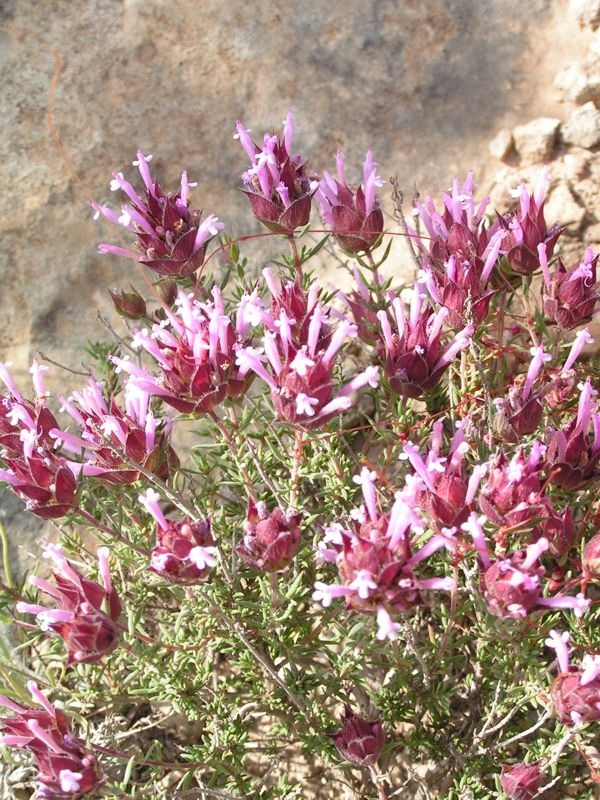

Scientific classification
- Kingdom: Plantae
- Clade: Tracheophytes
- Clade: Angiosperms
- Clade: Eudicots
- Clade: Asterids
- Order: Lamiales
- Family: Lamiaceae
- Genus: Thymus
- Species: T. moroderi

Binomial name
- Thymus moroderi Pau ex Martinez

= Thymus moroderi =

Species of flowering plant

Thymus moroderi is a small plant from the genus Thymus. It is endemic to some areas in the southern, driest part of the Alicante province (where it is called cantahueso or cantueso both in Spanish and Valencian) along with some isolated and similarly subarid locations in the contiguous Región de Murcia (Spain).

Thymus moroderi must not be confused with the somewhat similar in appearance (yet from the genus Lavandula) Lavandula stoechas, which is also called cantueso in Spanish.

When not blooming, thymus moroderi is an inconspicuous, dark green plant with tiny leaves and an overall modest appearance. Its typical size is small, with mature specimens reaching in optimal conditions a radius of some 25 cm, and approximately 20 cm height.

It blooms from April through early June; during these weeks, its normally dull appearance changes dramatically by virtue of its conspicuous flowers.

Thymus moroderi is a xerophyte plant which thrives in areas with a total annual precipitation of 300mm and less, as recorded in the southern part of the Alicante province and contiguous areas in Murcia. It also shows a preference for otherwise extremely poor soils, especially those showing traces of gypsum.

Despite Thymus moroderi not being listed in any endangered species collection, arguably it is not a common species because of its patchy distribution, often being present within areas densely populated, with the risk of flower picking for traditional usages (which, despite recommendations to only trim the plant, some may still carry out by uprooting it completely).

== Popular uses ==
Cantueso, a traditional local liquor, is distilled from the plant.

Besides, mostly around the city of Elche the flowers of Thymus moroderi are traditionally picked and then desiccated for ready consumption through the year as a stomach herbal tonic, which is brewed as herbal tea.

Since 2013 different trials have been started in order to domesticate the species, so to allow commercial cultivation. Besides the traditional ones, other potential usages being considered are connected to its essential oil and ornamental qualities.
