= Cantueso =

Cantueso is a liquor made in the Spanish province of Alicante.

It is obtained from the distillation of the flowers and peduncle (botany) of the thyme plant Thymus moroderi and grain alcohol. Cantueso typically contains between 25% and 35% alcohol, with 100 grams of sugar per liter, giving it its characteristic, very sweet flavor, and a color that runs from transparent to brownish-gray. Given its sweet flavor, it is usually taken after meals, as a stomach tonic.

Cantueso must rest for at least two months, then is aged in wood casks during a period of at least two years. Its production is regulated by the denominación de origen "Distilled spirits of Alicante," along with anise paloma, herbero, and the café licor of Alcoy.
