= González Byass =

Spanish sherry winery

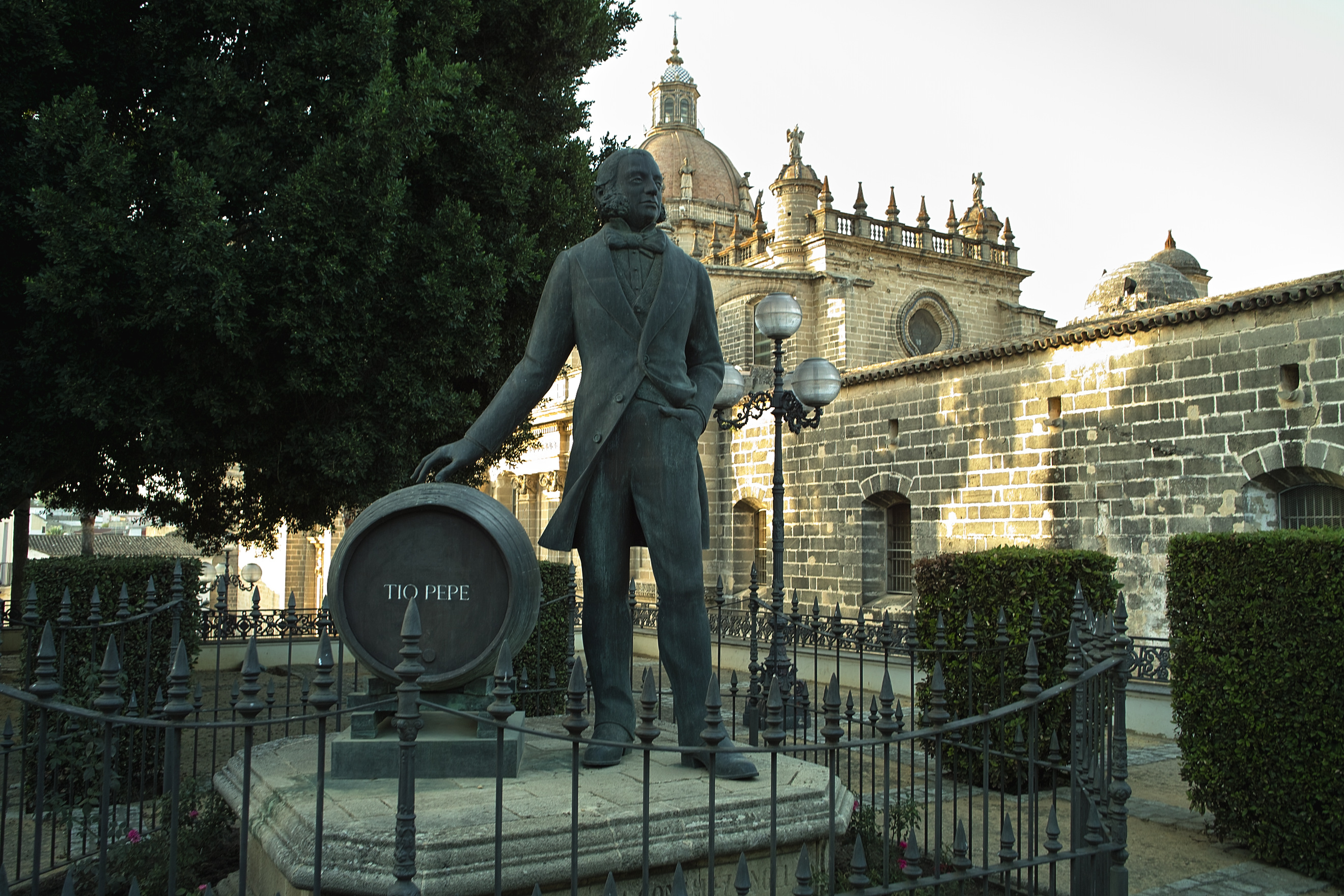
Monument to Manuel María González, founder of the winery, in Jerez de la Frontera

González Byass is one of Spain's best-known sherry bodegas. Its origins can be traced to 1835 when it was founded by Manuel María González Angel, who was subsequently joined by his English agent, Robert Blake Byass. The business was further expanded by the second generation of the González family, amongst them Manuel Críspulo González y Soto. The González family assumed sole control of the business in 1988. The firm produces the fino sherry Tío Pepe.

Not only was the González family at the forefront of sherry winemaking, they have also participated in the introduction of the polo game in Spain, the first grass tennis court, the installation of the first electric lighting and running water in the plant, the first train project in Spain as well as numerous other industrial and cultural innovations. In 1862, when Queen Isabel II visited the firm, the construction of a new bodega called La Concha was commissioned from the engineer Gustav Eiffel.

In 1963 they constructed the great Tío Pepe bodega, holding 28,000 butts and built on 3 floors. Another bodega was built in 1972, Las Copas, with a capacity of around 80,000 butts. In 1998 the Byass family withdrew from the company. The company is now owned and run by the 4th and 5th generation of the González family, such as Mauricio González-Gordon y Díez. In 2004, González Byass joined forces with Grupo Vips and opened 8 Tio Pepe restaurants in Madrid, but they were closed in 2011 due to the crisis. In 2008 the company acquired the well-known Viñas del Vero wineries.

The famous sombrero-wearing, guitar-toting bottle became the classic image of the Tio Pepe brand in 1935. The famous neon sign in Puerta del Sol in Madrid caused a bit of a stir when Apple bought the building and decided that the sign should be removed from the roof (probably to replace it with the Apple logo). The bodega has found another rooftop in the same Puerta del Sol once again and the sign has been reinstalled after renovations.

The used barrels from this renowned sherry producer are used by Scotch Whisky producers during the maturation of the premium spirits. Dalmore distillery use 30-year-old barrels in their 18-year-old single malt.

== Awards ==
In 2010, González Byass was chosen as Winemaker of the Year in the International Wine and Spirit Competition.

In 2014 the company won the "Best Visitor Centre" award in the Drinks International Wine Tourism Awards

In 2020 they were named "Wine Family of the Year" in the international awards 'Excellence in Wine and Spirits'.
