= Spanish Ornithological Society =

Spanish ornithological conservation organization

- Founded: 1954
- Headquarters: Madrid, Spain

The Spanish Ornithological Society (Spanish: Sociedad Española de Ornitología, SEO), also known as SEO/BirdLife, is Spain's main bird conservation charity. It was founded in 1954 and has about 8,000 members and 50 staff. It is Spain's representative in the BirdLife International partnership. It is headquartered in Madrid, Spain.

== History ==
The Spanish Ornithological Society (SEO/BirdLife) was founded in 1954 by a group of ornithologists and bird enthusiasts aiming to protect Spain's avian biodiversity.

In its early years, SEO focused on scientific study and observation of birds across Spain, organizing field trips, bird censuses, and local awareness campaigns. By the 1970s, the organization had initiated national bird censuses to monitor population trends and identify priority areas for conservation.

During the 1980s and 1990s, SEO expanded its work to include habitat protection and public advocacy. A major milestone was the publication of the first national bird atlas in 1995, documenting the distribution and breeding status of all bird species in Spain.

Since the 2000s, SEO/BirdLife has grown into a nationwide conservation organization, combining research, policy advocacy, education, and international projects. It continues to play a leading role in bird conservation and environmental protection.

== Activities ==
The SEO has campaigned to get the central government to have all areas currently designated as Important Bird Areas to be given Special Protection Area status. It also collects bird data and recently published the Atlas of Breeding Birds of Spain, which covers the whole country and all breeding species recorded. This work took four years of research, writing and editing.

It has censused Eurasian griffon vultures, campaigned against illegal poisoning of raptors and other predators, and worked on sustainable agriculture in the Ebro Delta, one of Spain's most important wetland areas.

In addition to conservation and research, SEO/BirdLife carries out environmental education programmes, citizen science initiatives, and public awareness campaigns which promote bird conservation and sustainable land use throughout Spain.

Since 1998, SEO/BirdLife has also implemented an international programme in North Africa and Latin America. The main focus as of 2008 is Morocco, carrying out different projects, mainly in wetlands. It is involved in monitoring the critically endangered northern bald ibis in its Moroccan stronghold in the Souss-Massa National Park.
