= Bonanza, Spain =

Port in Spain

Coordinates: 36.801°N 6.335°W

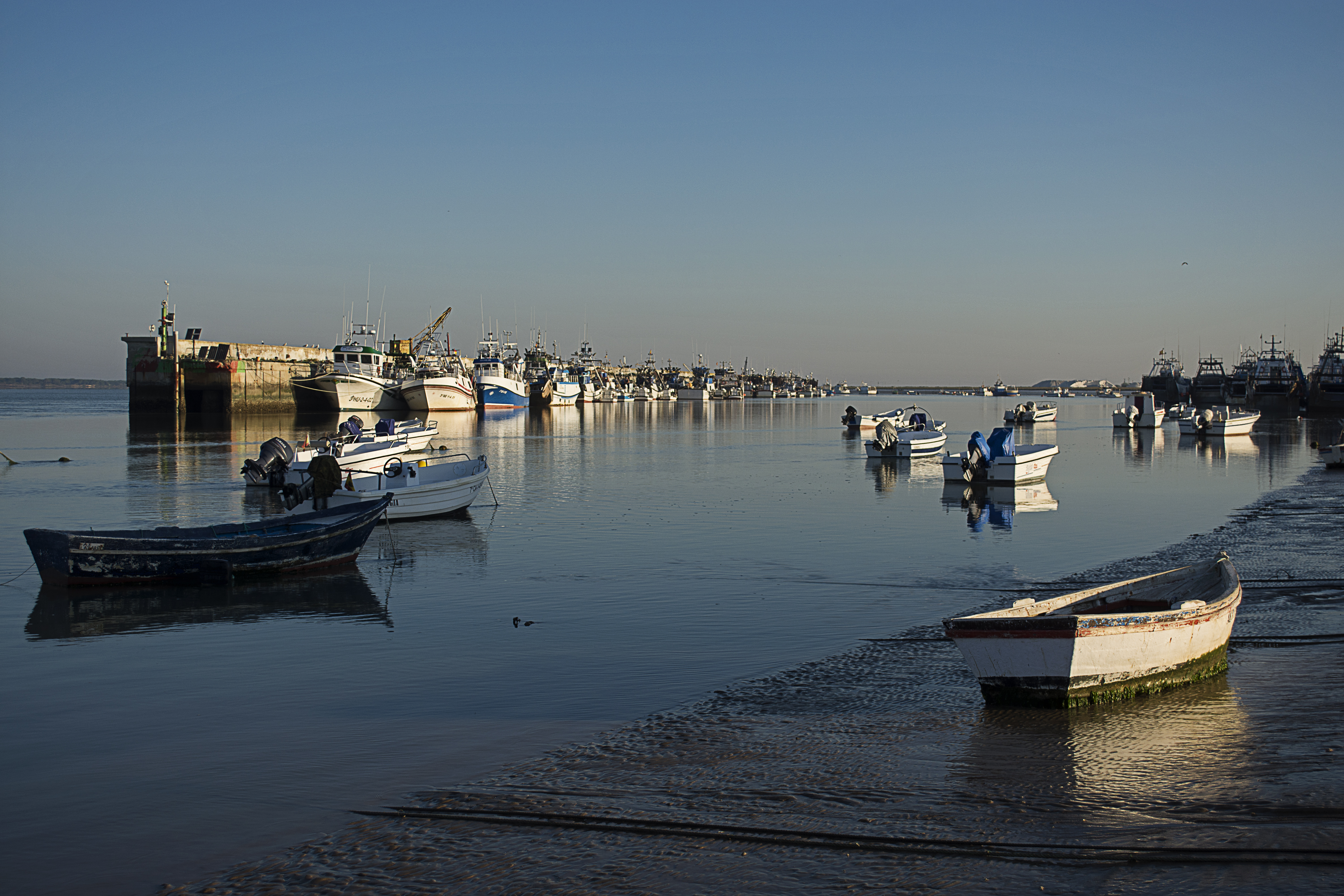
Port of Bonanza in Sanlúcar de Barrameda

Bonanza is a port in the city of Sanlúcar de Barrameda, in the province of Cádiz and the community of Andalusia, Spain.

== History ==
In the past the harbor was called the port of Barrameda, and more rarely the port of Zanfanejos, but from the middle of the 16th century the name "port of Bonanza" was used, due to a nearby hermitage called Nuestra Señora de la Bonanza built in 1503.

== Fiction ==
Neal Stephenson named half of his novel The Confusion after the port, and had a character describe it as functioning as a chief treasure port of Spain until 1686, and as losing to Cádiz most of what would earlier have been part of its trade, due to the combined effects of increasing vessel draft and of sedimentation at the mouth the river Guadalquivir.

== See also ==
- Marquisate of Bonanza
