= Marquisate of Bonanza =

Spanish nobility title

- Creation date: 6 February 1902
- Created by: Alfonso XIII of Spain
- Peerage: Spain
- First holder: Manuel Críspulo González y Soto
- Present holder: Mauricio González-Gordon y Díez
- Heir apparent: Bibiana María González-Gordon
- Remainder to: heirs of the body of the grantee according to absolute primogeniture

Marquis of Bonanza (Spanish: Marquesado de Bonanza) is a hereditary title in the Spanish nobility. The marquisate was bestowed by Maria Christina of Austria as Queen Regnant on behalf of her son Alfonso XIII of Spain on Manuel Críspulo González y Soto, by Royal Decree on 6 February 1902. Bonanza refers to a port of Sanlúcar de Barrameda, near the home base of the González family.

== Marquesses of Bonanza (1902) ==
- Manuel Críspulo González y Soto, 1st Marquis of Bonanza (1846–1933)
- José Luis González y de Ágreda, 2nd Marquis of Bonanza (1881–1940), son of the preceding
- Isabel González y de Ágreda, 3rd Marquessa of Bonanza (1883–?), sister of the preceding
- Manuel María González Gordon, 4th Marquis of Bonanza (1886–1980), cousin of the preceding
- Mauricio González-Gordon y Díez (1923–2013), 5th Marquis of Bonanza, son of the preceding

Isabel González y de Ágreda officially ceded the title to her cousin Manuel María González Gordon on 13 November 1969. The father of Manuel María was Pedro Nolasco, brother of Manuel Críspulo. Mauricio González-Gordon y Díez obtained the title on 10 November 1980, after the death of his father, Manuel María.

The heir apparent is the last holder's daughter Bibiana María González-Gordon. The title has not been claimed since the death of Mauricio González-Gordon y Díez.
