= Tío Pepe =

Brand of sherry

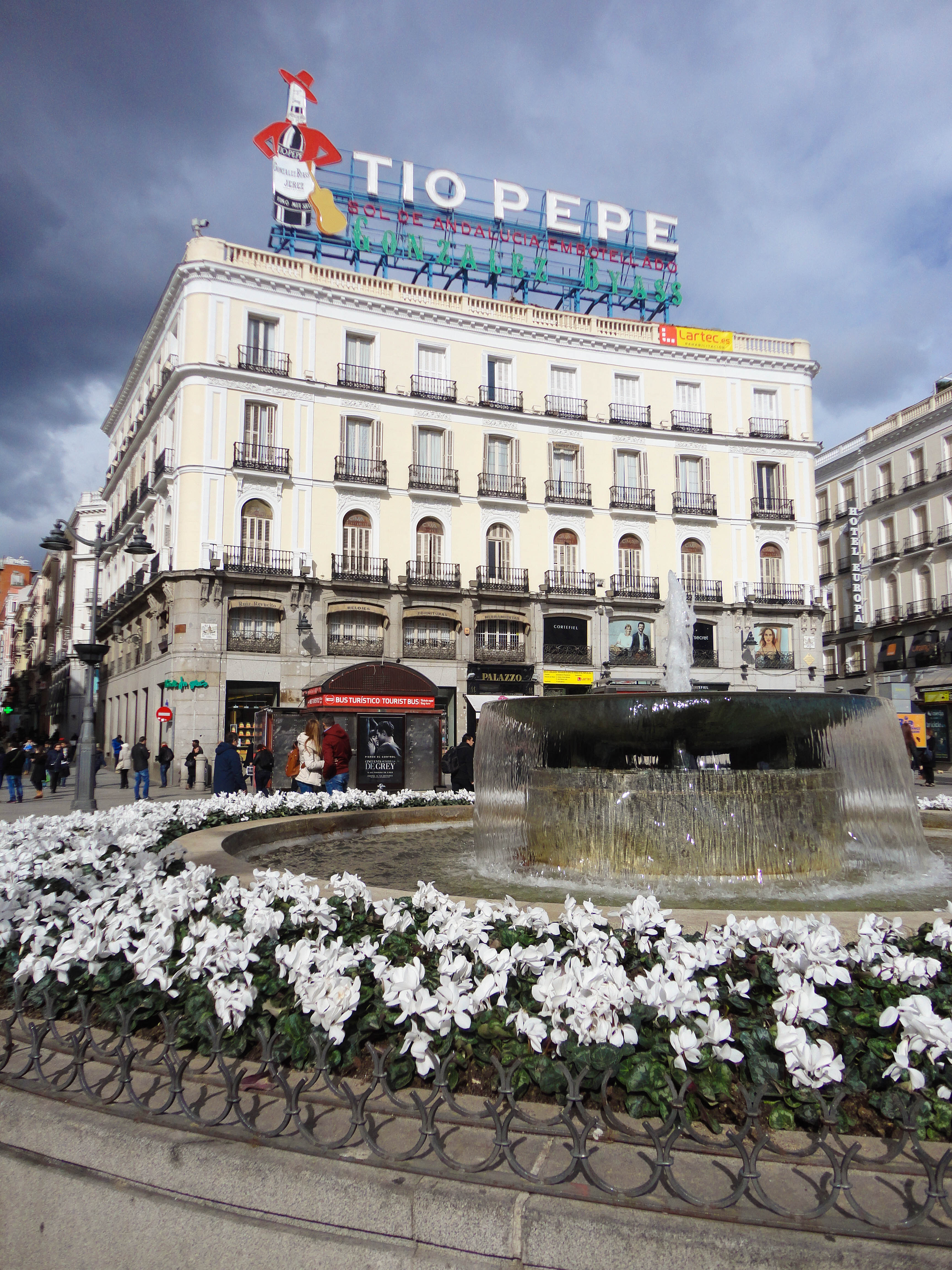
The landmark Tío Pepe sign at Puerta del Sol in Madrid

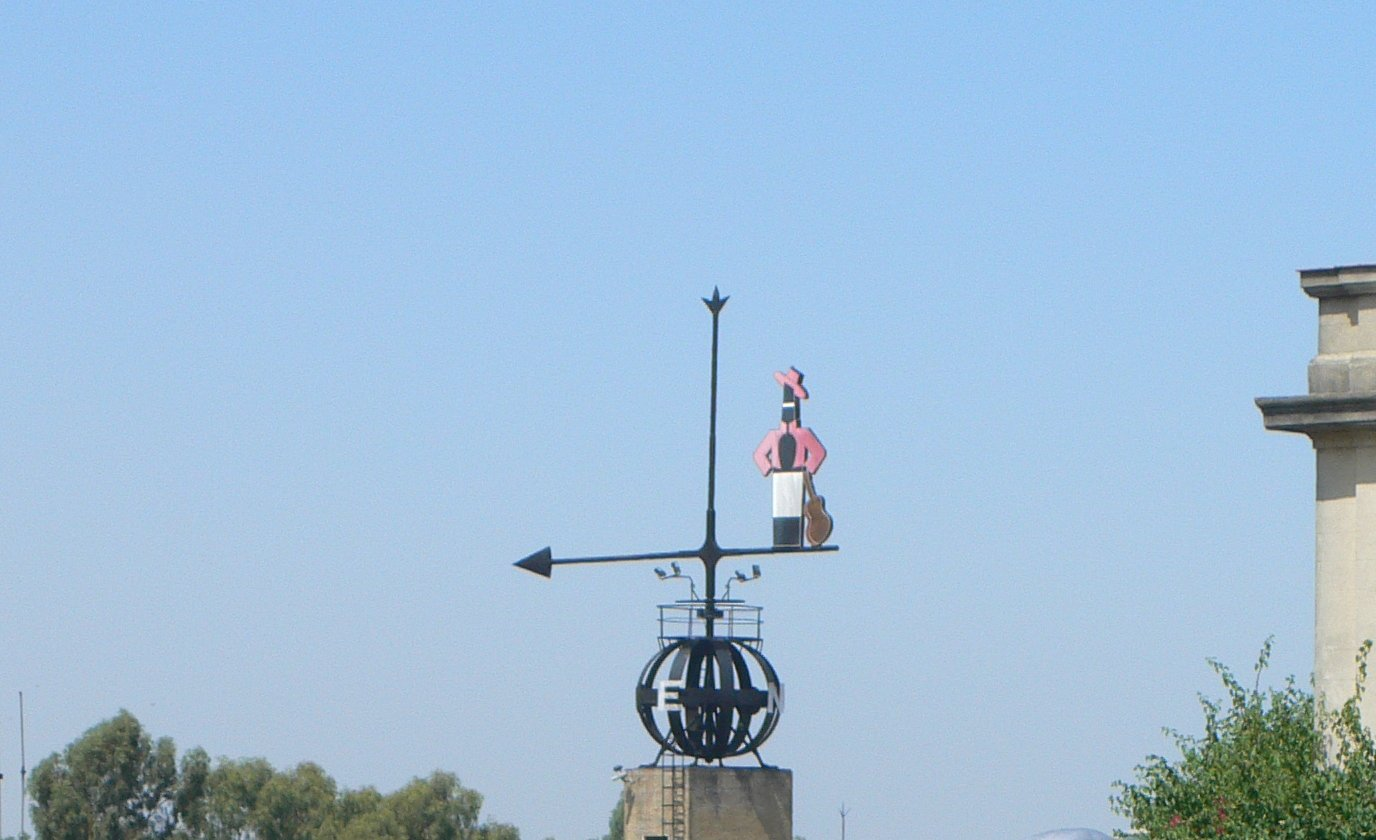
Tío Pepe wind vane in Jerez, the Guinness world record holder of the largest operational wind vane

Tío Pepe (in Spanish, "Uncle Pepe", named after one of the founders' uncles) is a brand of Sherry. It is best known for its fino style of dry sherry made from the palomino grape. The Tío Pepe brand is owned by the González Byass Sherry house.

== Tío Pepe ==
Tío Pepe has based its success on promoting itself as a very dry white wine to be served with food, in doing so aiming to differentiate itself from poor quality sherries and their downmarket reputation. The Tío Pepe soleras were established in 1844 and have run uninterrupted since that time.

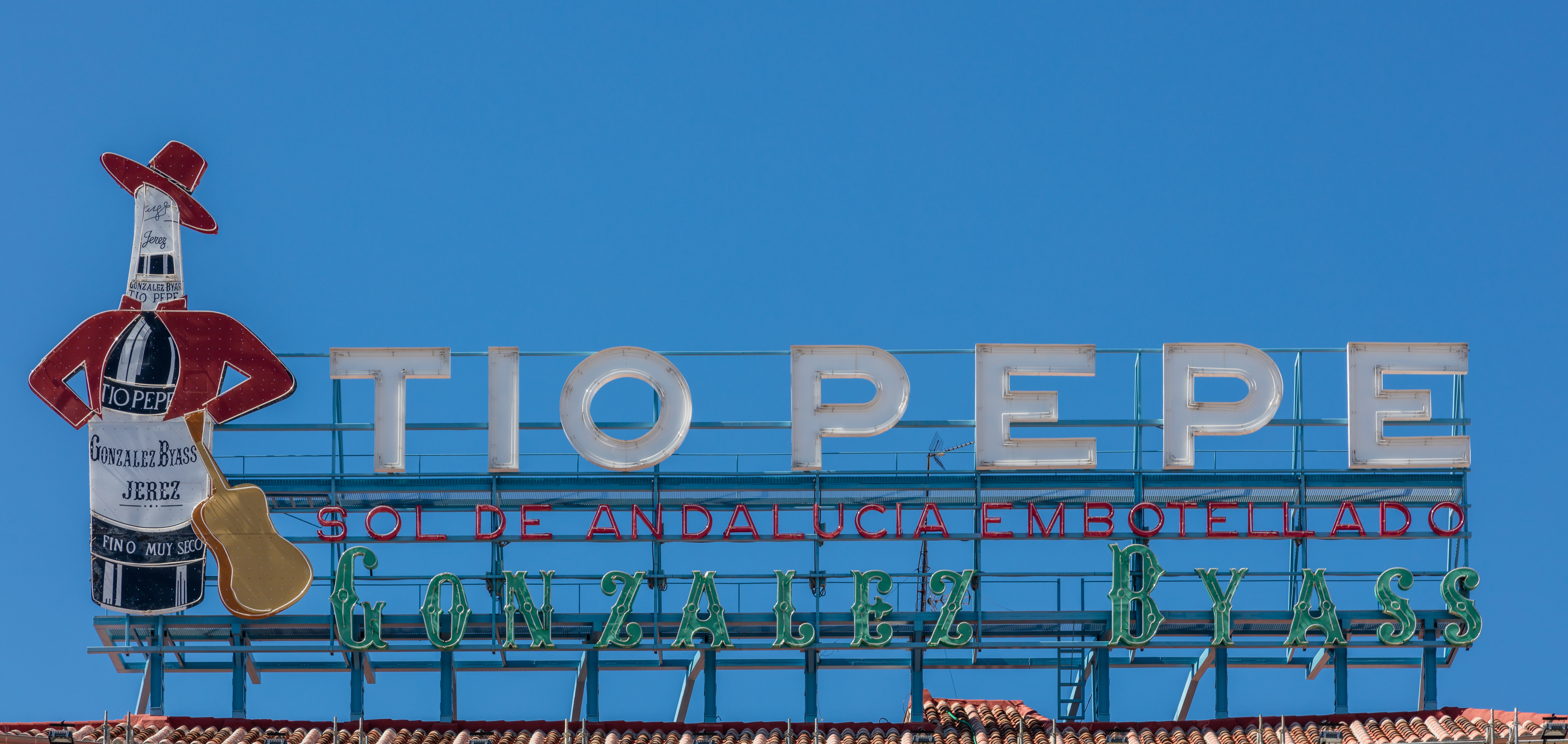
Close-up of the Tío Pepe sign

== Cultural references ==
In Len Deighton’s novel The IPCRESS File (1962), the protagonist, (called Harry Palmer in the film and TV series), drinks Tio Pepe at one of his meetings with his boss Ross.
