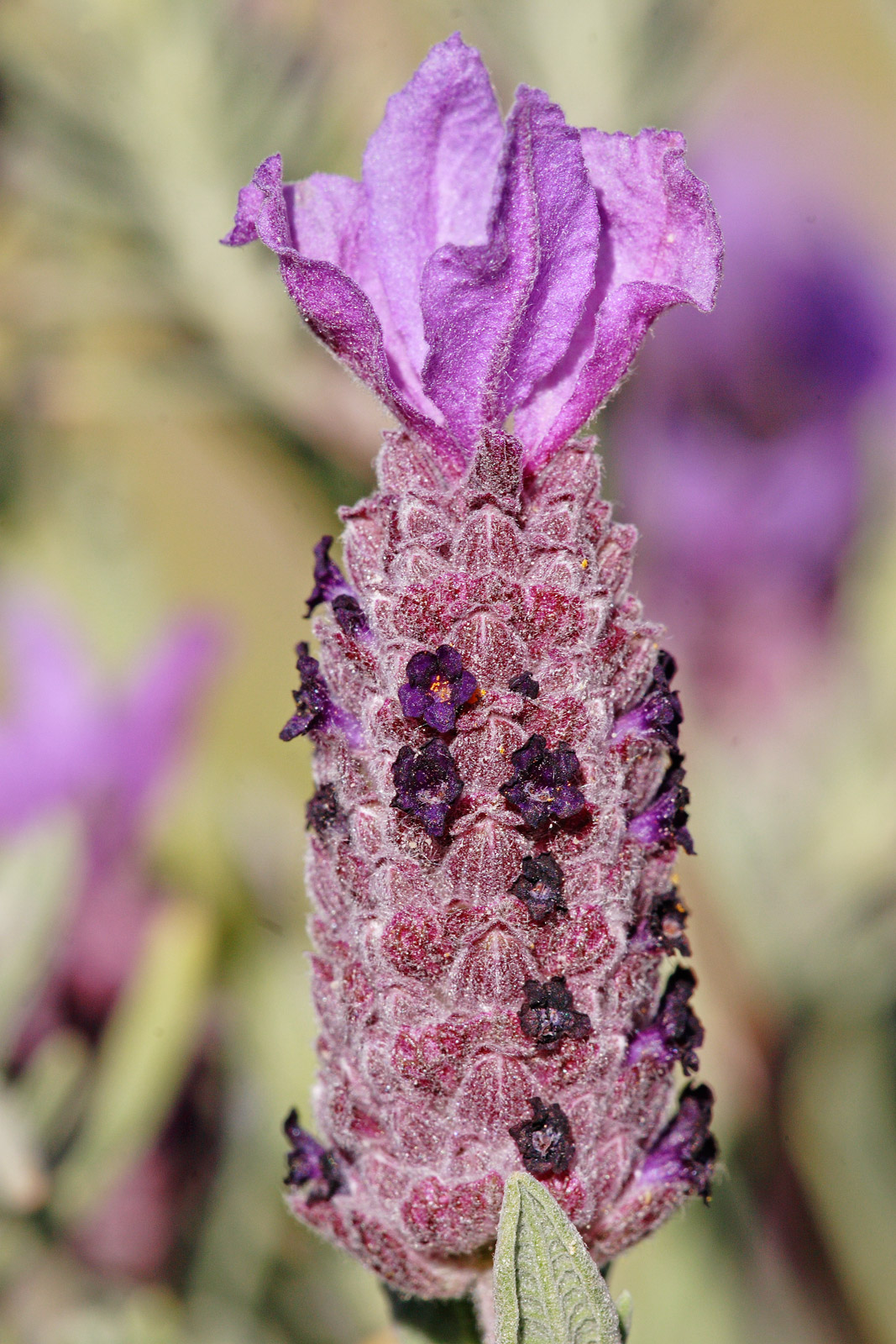
- Lavandula stoechas flowers

Scientific classification
- Kingdom: Plantae
- Clade: Tracheophytes
- Clade: Angiosperms
- Clade: Eudicots
- Clade: Asterids
- Order: Lamiales
- Family: Lamiaceae
- Genus: Lavandula
- Species: L. stoechas

Binomial name
- Lavandula stoechas L.

= Lavandula stoechas =

Species of flowering plant

Lavandula stoechas, the Spanish lavender or topped lavender (U.S.) or French lavender (U.K.), is a species of lavender native to the Mediterranean Basin.

== Taxonomy ==
The flower was first recorded by Greek botanist Pedanius Dioscorides as the name στοιχάς stoikhas coming from the Stoechades Islands, the Greek name became its specific epithet.

=== Subspecies ===
The recognised subspecies are:

- L. stoechas ssp. luisieri, native to the southwest quadrant of the Iberian Peninsula (southern Portugal and southwest Spain). It has lanceolate axilary leaves that are much larger than those of the nominal subspecies, along with a greyish indumentum (opposing the whitish indumentum of the nominal subspecies).

== Description ==
It is an evergreen shrub that usually grows to between 30–100 centimetres (12–39 in) tall, but occasionally up to 2 metres (6.6 ft) tall in the subspecies L. stoechas subsp. luisieri. Its leaves are 1–4 cm long, greyish and tomentose. The inflorescence is crowned by a mass of purple elongated ovoid bracts about 5 cm long. Lower flowers form a tight rectangle in cross-section. The upper of the five teeth has a wrong-heart-shaped appendage. The crown is blackish-violet, up to 8 mm long and indistinct two-lipped.

The flowers, which appear in late spring and early summer, are pink to purple, produced on spikes 2 cm long at the top of slender, leafless stems 10–30 cm (4–12 in) long; each flower is subtended by a bract 4–8 mm long. At the top of the spike are a number of much larger, sterile bracts (no flowers between them), 10–50 mm long and bright lavender purple (rarely white). It blooms in spring and early summer, from the month of March in its native habitat, depending on the climate in which it grows.

== Cultivation ==
This species is more tender than common lavender (Lavandula angustifolia), being less frost-resistant, but harsher and more resinous in its oils. Like other lavenders, it is associated with hot, dry, sunny conditions in alkaline soils. However, it tolerates a range of situations, though it may be short-lived. Hardy down to −10 °C (14 °F) (USDA zones 8–10).

The following cultivars have won the Royal Horticultural Society's Award of Garden Merit:-

- 'Ballerina'
- 'Pretty Polly'
- 'Willow Vale'

== Other uses ==
The flowers are used in aromatherapy to prepare infusions and essential oils that contain ketones (d-camphor and d-fenchone) and alcohols (borneol and terpineol).

== Invasive species ==
Since its introduction into Australia, it has become an invasive species, widely distributed within the continent. It has been declared a noxious weed in Victoria since 1920. It also is regarded as a weed in parts of Spain.

== Gallery ==
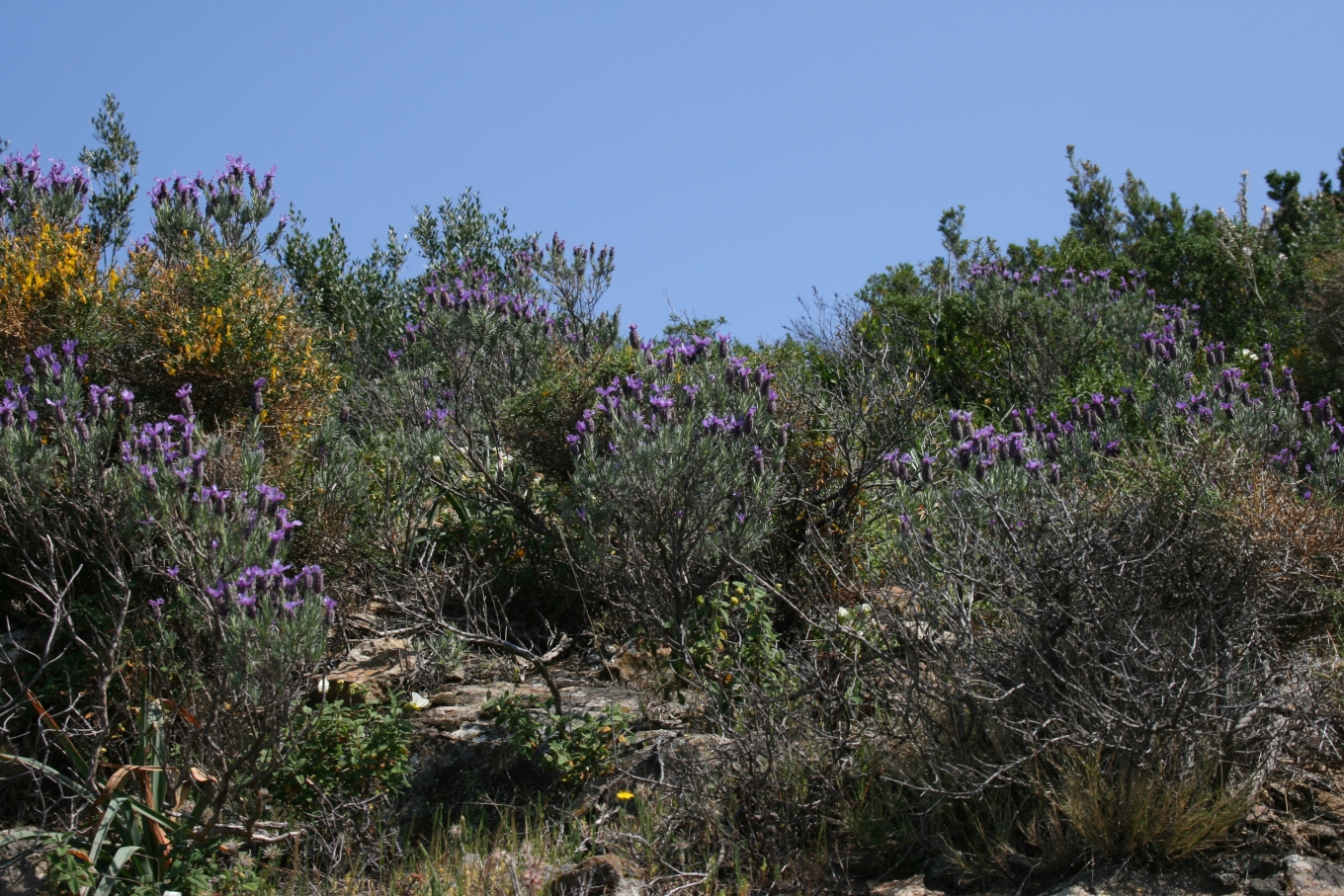
Wild L. stoechas

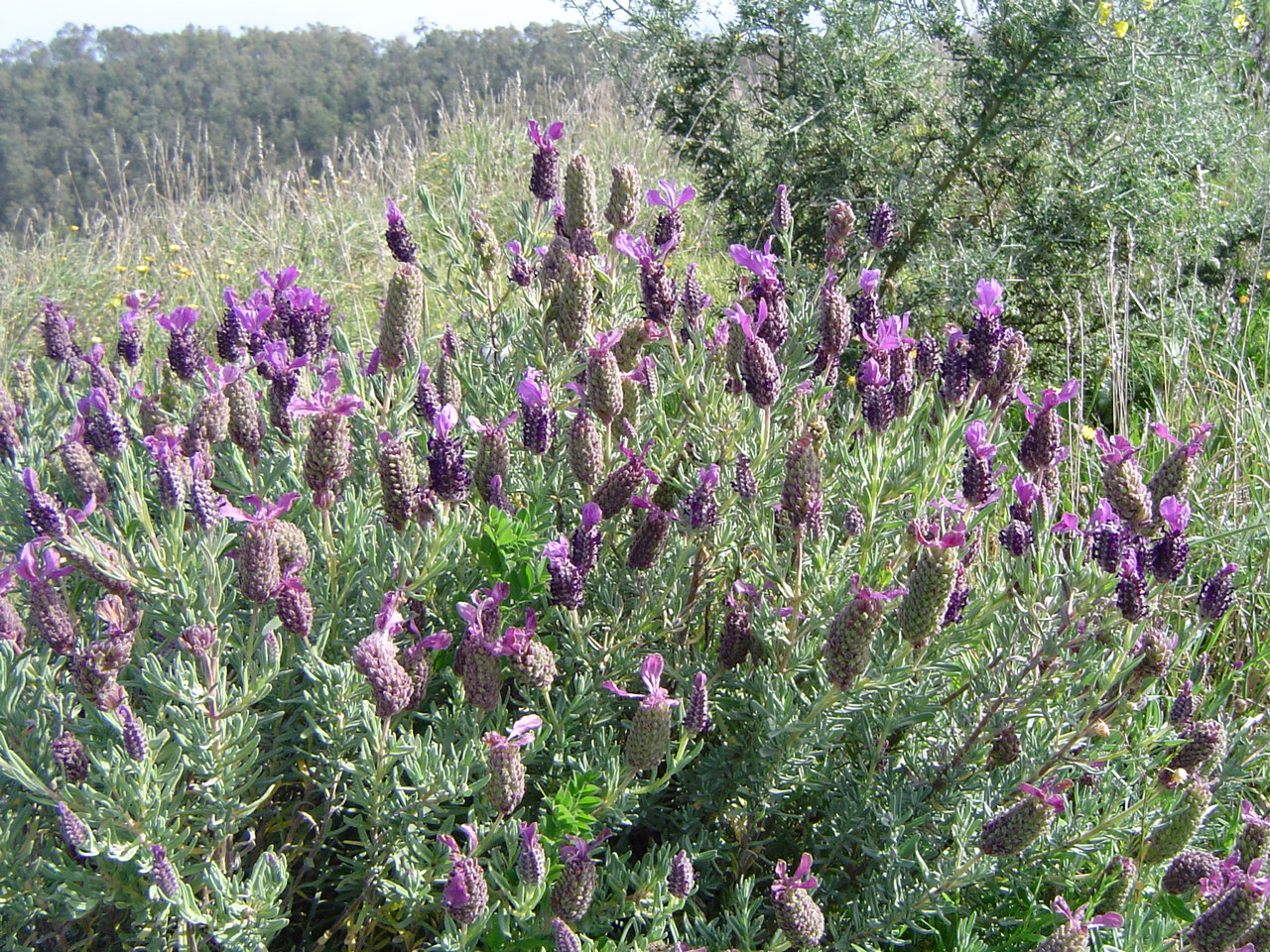
Wild in Ceuta, Spain

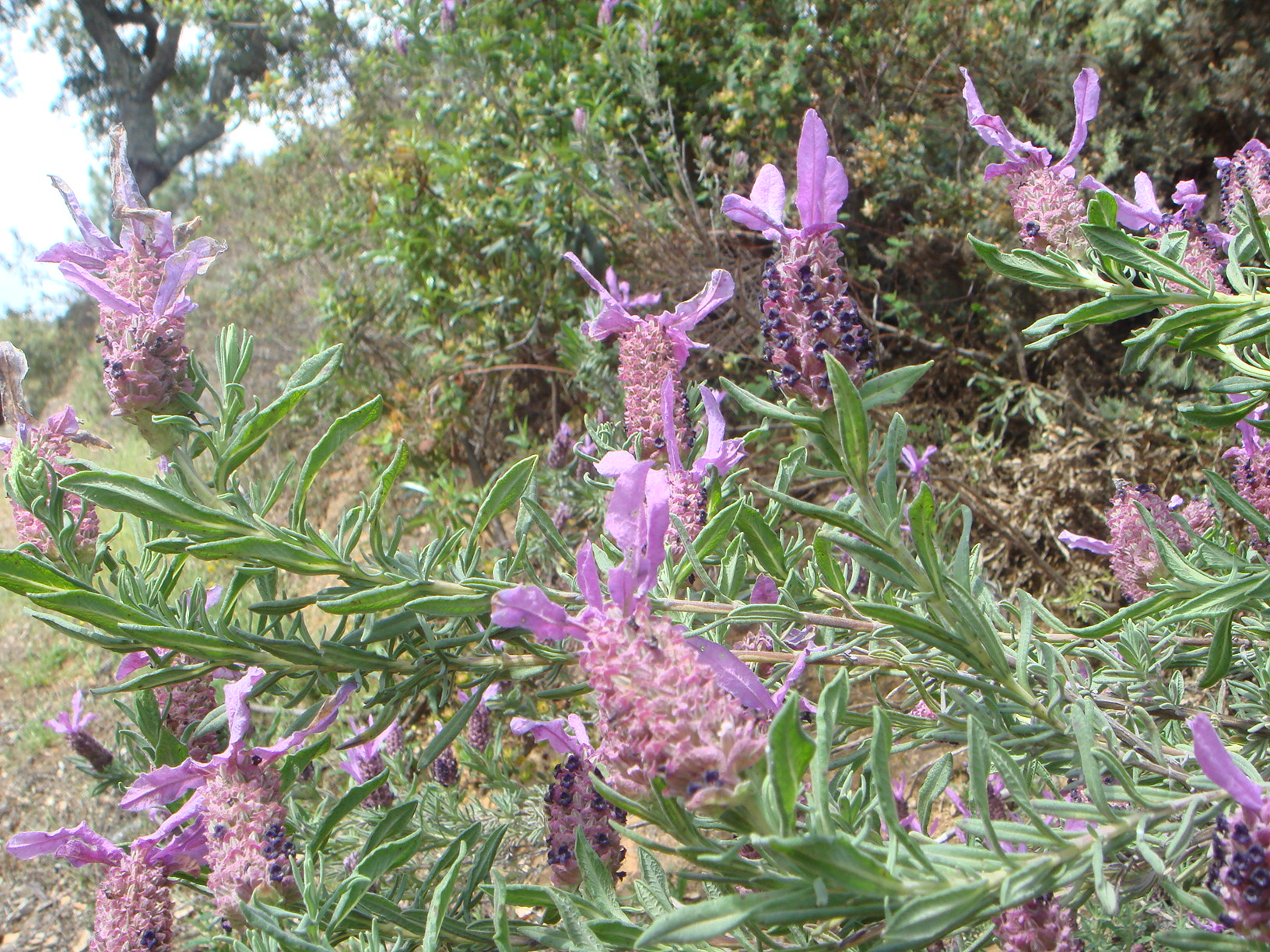
Subspecies luisieri

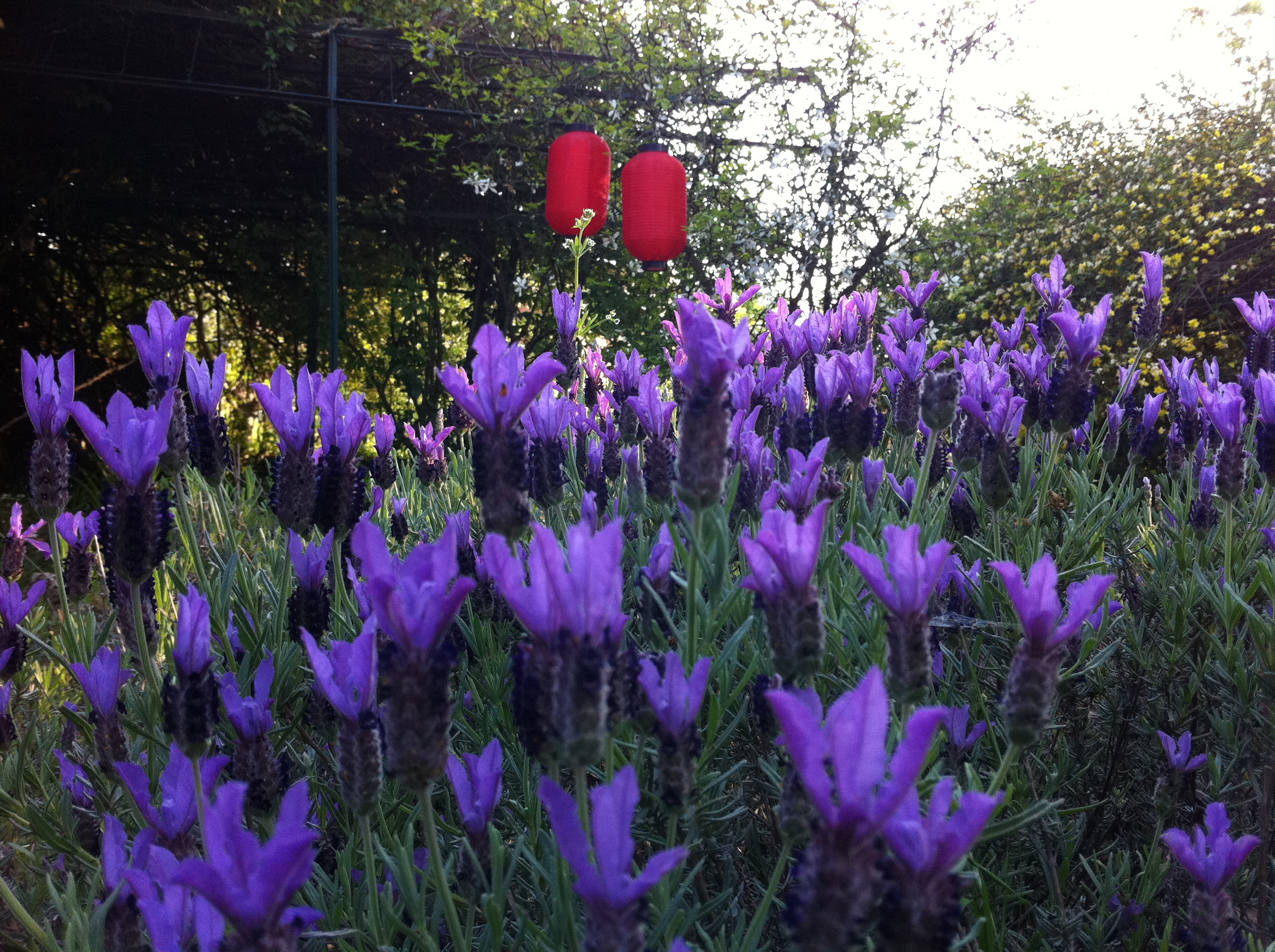
Italy

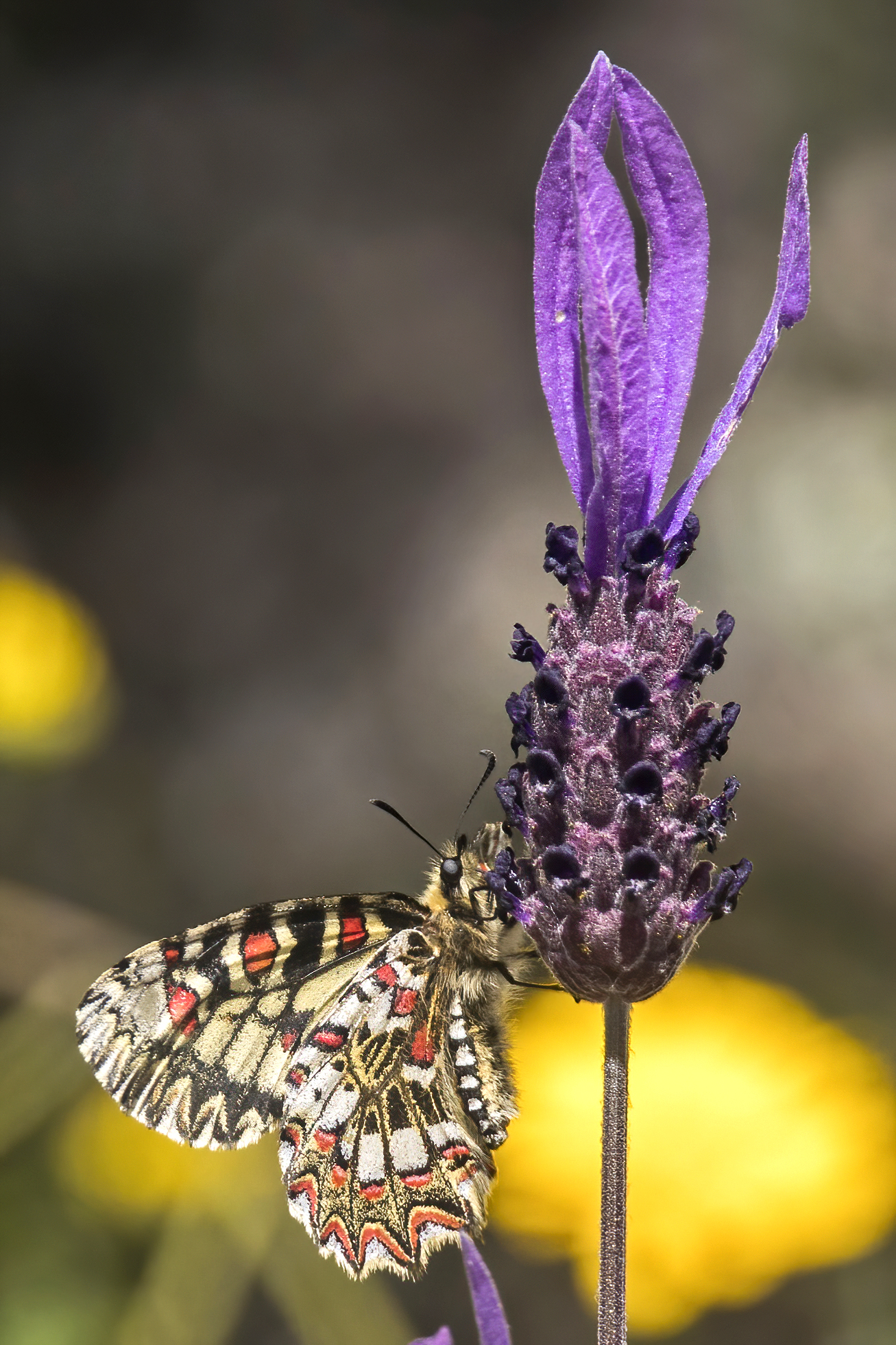
with Spanish festoon (Zerynthia rumina)
